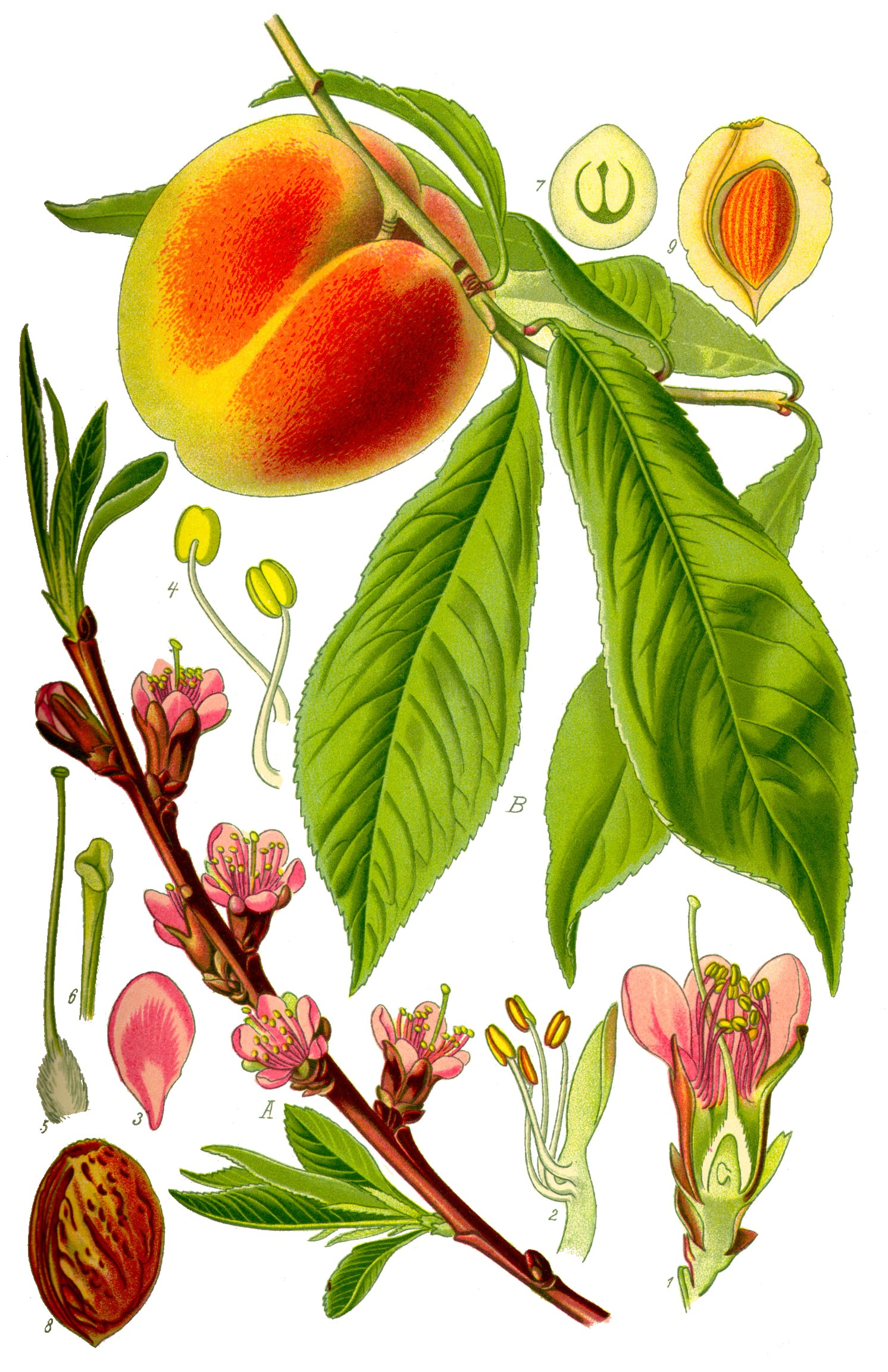
- Peach flower, fruit, seed and leaves as illustrated by Walter Müller
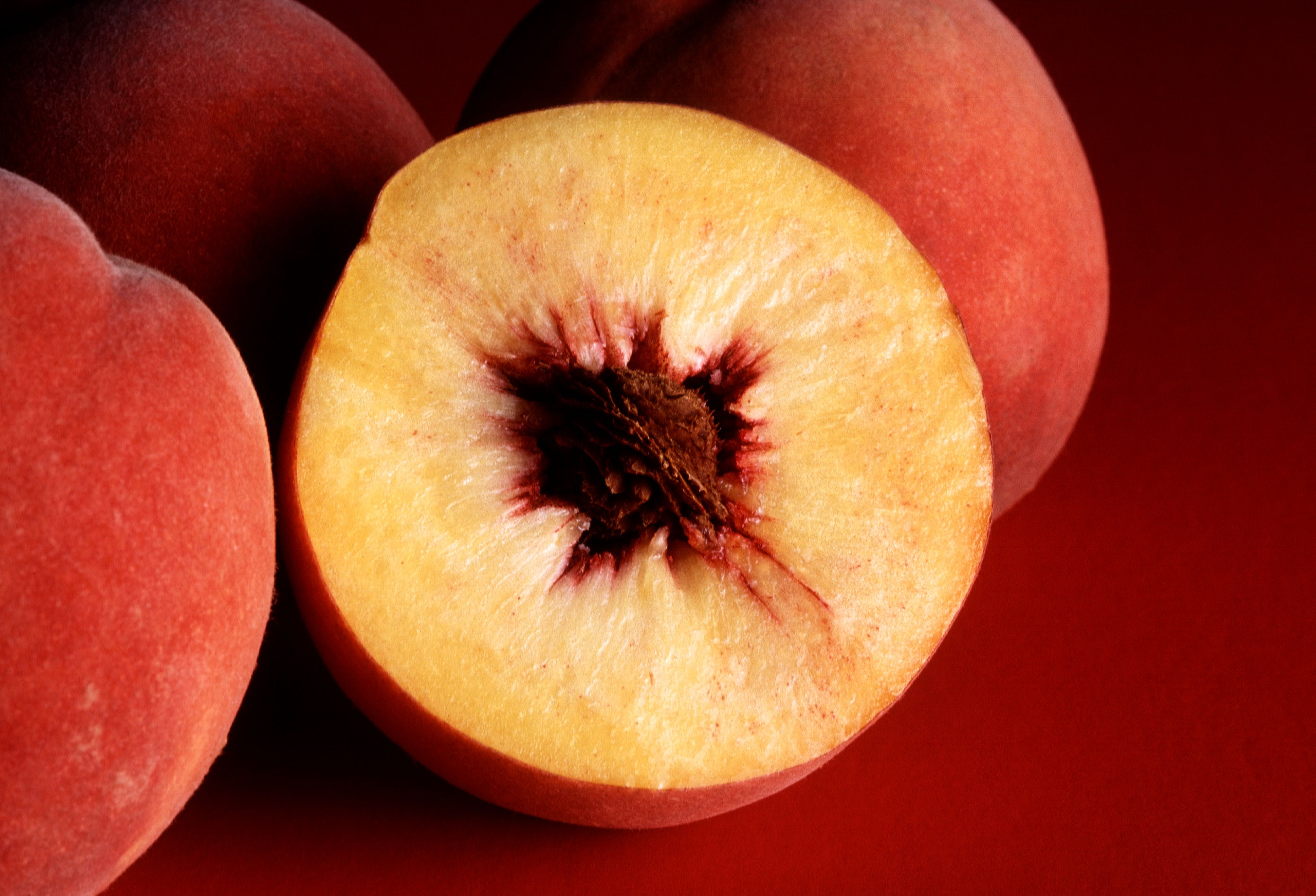
- 'Autumn Red' peach, freestone cultivar in cross section

Scientific classification
- Kingdom: Plantae
- Clade: Tracheophytes
- Clade: Angiosperms
- Clade: Eudicots
- Clade: Rosids
- Order: Rosales
- Family: Rosaceae
- Genus: Prunus
- Species: P. persica

Binomial name
- Prunus persica (L.) Batsch

Synonyms
- List: Amygdalus communis var. persica (L.) Risso; Amygdalus ferganensis (Kostina & Rjabov) T.T.Yu & L.T.Lu; Amygdalus laevis (DC.) Lej.; Amygdalus nucipersica (L.) Rchb.; Amygdalus persica L.; Persica domestica Risso; Persica ferganensis (Kostina & Rjabov) Kovalev & Kostina; Persica laevis DC.; Persica levis Risso; Persica mammillata Poit. & Turpin; Persica nana Mill.; Persica nucipersica (L.) Borkh.; Persica pendula Siebold; Persica platycarpa Decne.; Persica vulgaris Mill.; Prunus daemonifuga H.Lév. & Vaniot

= Peach =

Type of fruit tree, or its fruit

The peach (Prunus persica) is a deciduous tree that bears edible juicy fruits with various characteristics. Most are simply called peaches, while the glossy-skinned, non-fuzzy varieties are called nectarines. Though from the same species, they are regarded commercially as different fruits.

In addition to being planted for its fruit, peaches are planted as ornamentals for their flowers. It is relatively short lived, usually not exceeding twenty years of age. Peaches were first domesticated and cultivated in China during the Neolithic period. The specific name persica refers to its widespread cultivation in Persia (modern-day Iran), from where it was transplanted to Europe. It belongs to the genus Prunus, which also includes the cherry, apricot, almond, and plum, and which is part of the rose family.

The peach is very popular; only the apple and pear have higher production amounts for temperate fruits. In 2023, China produced 65% of the world total of peaches and nectarines. Other leading countries, such as Spain, Turkey, Italy, the U.S., and Iran lag far behind China, with none producing more than 5% of the world total. The fruit is regarded as a symbol of longevity in China.

== Description ==
The peach is a deciduous tree or tree like shrub that may rarely grow to as much as 10 meters (33 ft) tall, but is more typically 3 m (10 ft) with large specimens reaching 4 m (13 ft). The spread of the crown is similar to the height, ranging from 3 to 4 m (9.8 to 13.1 ft). They do not produce suckers or have thorns. The root system is deep, with the roots continuing to grow during the winter season.

Unlike apples, the size of peach trees is not generally controlled by dwarfing rootstocks in commercial orchards. A great variety of growth habits have been selected including columnar, dwarf, spreading, and weeping. In order to have a single trunk, trees must be pruned and likewise the branches have a tendency to droop over time and must be trained to allow for access under the tree.

The bark on the trunk and branches is dark gray with horizontal lenticels. It becomes more scaly and rough as the tree becomes older. Twigs on peach trees have a smooth, hairless surface, the bark is usually red, but may be green on the sides not exposed to the sun. As they become older, branchlets weather to become gray in color. Twigs have true terminal buds at their ends.

Peach leaves are oblong to lanceolate, having sides nearly parallel until tapering at end and base or shaped like the head of a spear. The widest portion of the leaf is midway or further towards the leaf tip. Each leaf folds along the central rib of the leaf and is often curved, usually 7–15 centimeters (3–6 in) long and 2–4.5 cm (1–2 in) wide, though occasionally they may be shorter. The surface of the leaves is smooth and hairless, but the leaf stem sometimes has glands. The edges of the leaves have serrated edges with blunt teeth. The teeth have a reddish-brown gland at the tip. Leaves are attached to the twigs by petioles, leaf stems. They are strong and measure 1 to 2 cm. They can have one or more extrafloral nectaries.

=== Flowering ===
Flowers on peach trees are either solitary or in groups of two, usually blooming before the leaves begin to grow. They may range in shades from white to red, but having pink or red flowers 2–3.5 cm in width is typical of cultivars selected for their fruit. Trees grown as ornamentals may have double flowers, semi-doubled flowers, or bicolored forms. Each flower has four or five petals and is somewhat cup-shaped with the petals curving to shelter the flower's center. Each flower will have 20 to 30 stamens and purple-red anthers at their ends. The single style is nearly as long as the stamens. The flowers are self-fertile and outcross at about 5%.

The bloom period is in the early spring, often cut short by frosts, in February, March, April, or May depending on location. In New Zealand and the southern hemisphere, blooming occurs in August to October.

=== Fruit ===
Trees can begin producing fruit in the two or three years after sprouting. Because of the hardness of the seed casing, peaches are called stone fruits like the others in the Prunus genus, but are more formally called drupes. Fruits range in color from greenish white to orange yellow, usually with a blush of red on the side of the fruit most exposed to the sun. Their shape varies widely from a flattened sphere resembling a doughnut, egg-shaped, or a slightly compressed sphere usually with a seam on one side. A normal diameter for a fruit is between 5 and 7 centimeters (2 and 3 in), but sometimes may be as small as 3 cm (1.2 in) or as large as 12 cm (4.7 in).

The flesh is quite variable in color from greenish-white to white to yellow to dark red. The texture can vary from soft to stone hard. The growth of the fruit is a double-sigmoid growth curve: a beginning quick period of development followed by a resting period of little growth, and then a second period of rapid maturation. The seed is much larger and less round than the seeds of its closest fruit relatives. Unlike the pit of an almond, which is only pitted, the peach pit has a stony exterior which is both pitted and deeply furrowed.

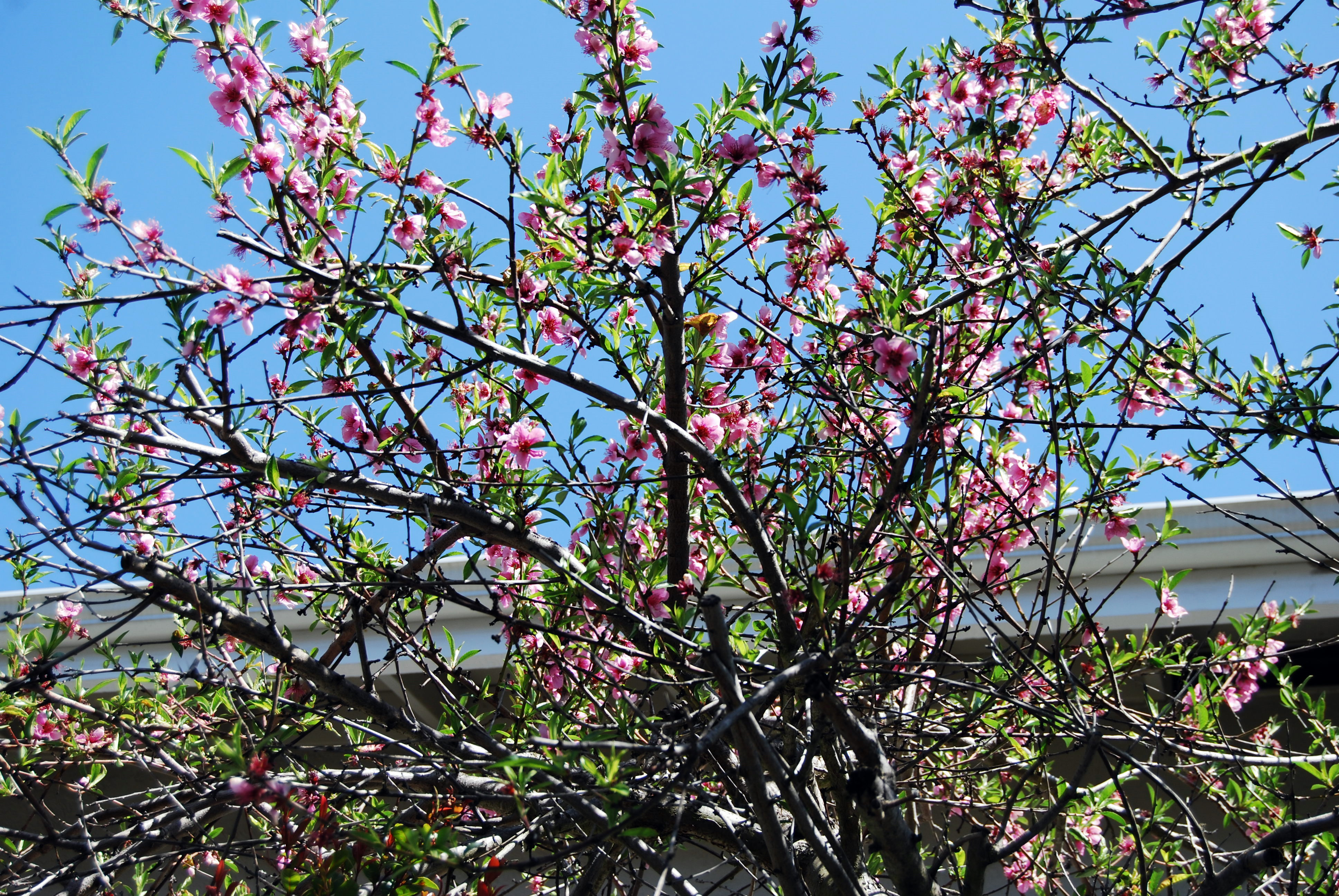

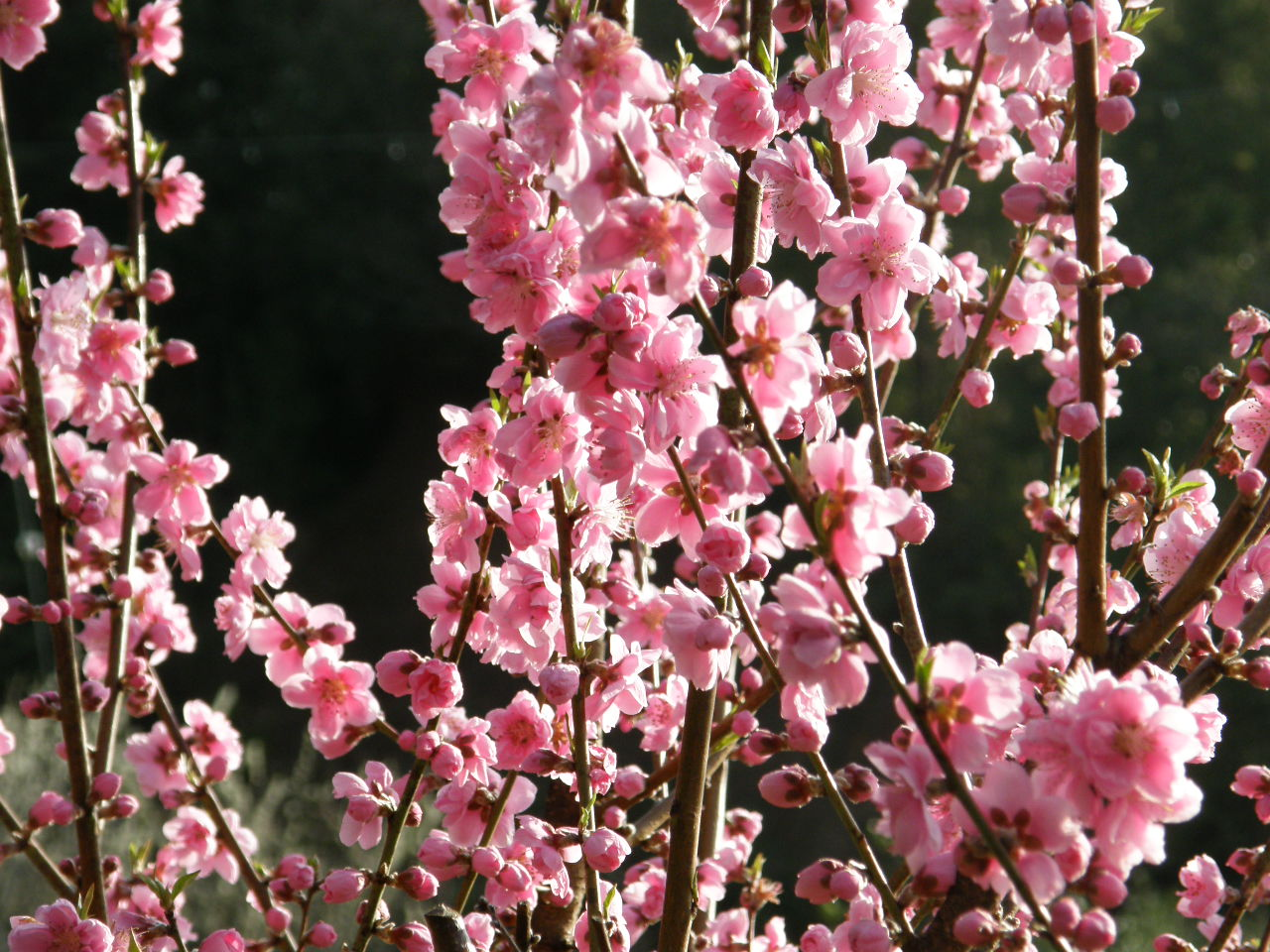
Peach blossoms

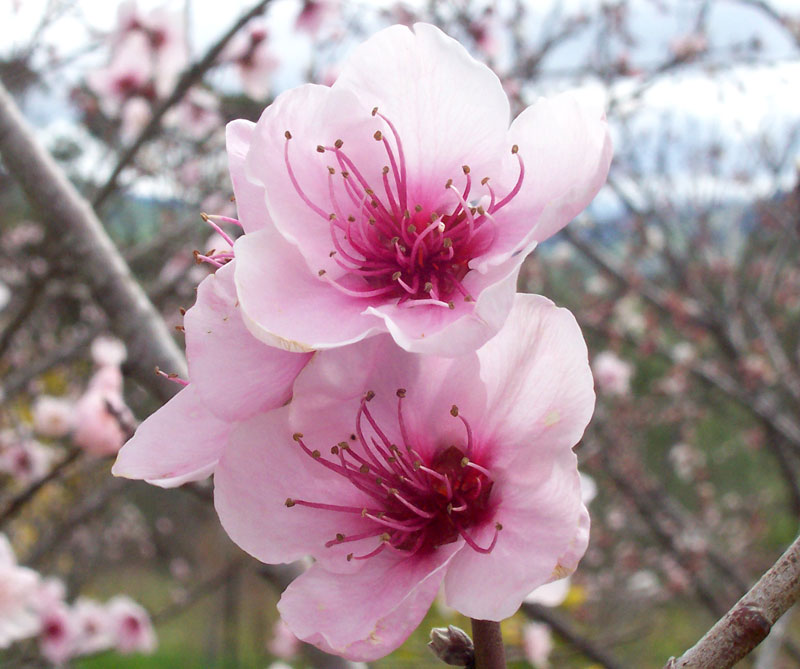

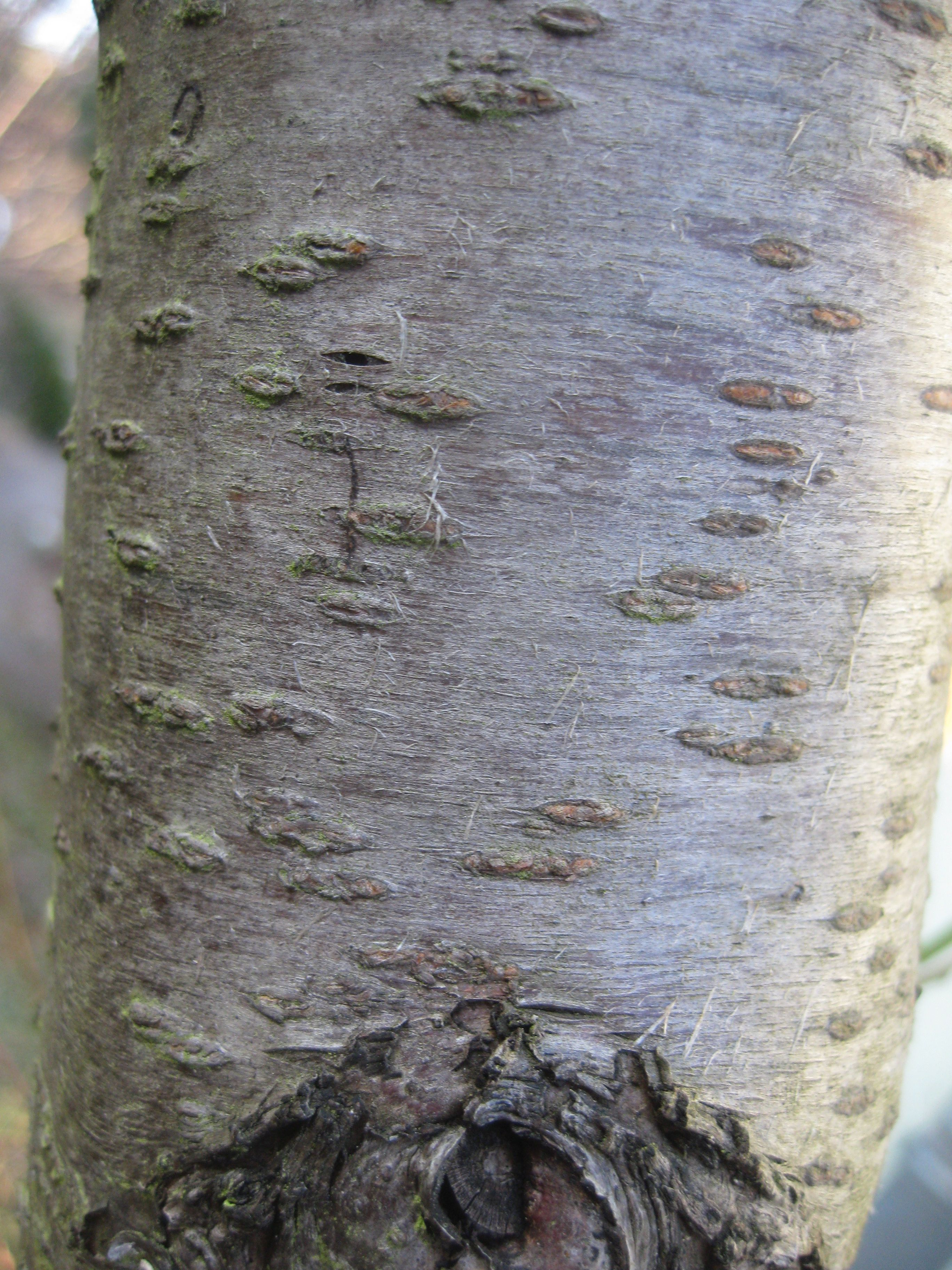
Gray bark on trunk with lenticels

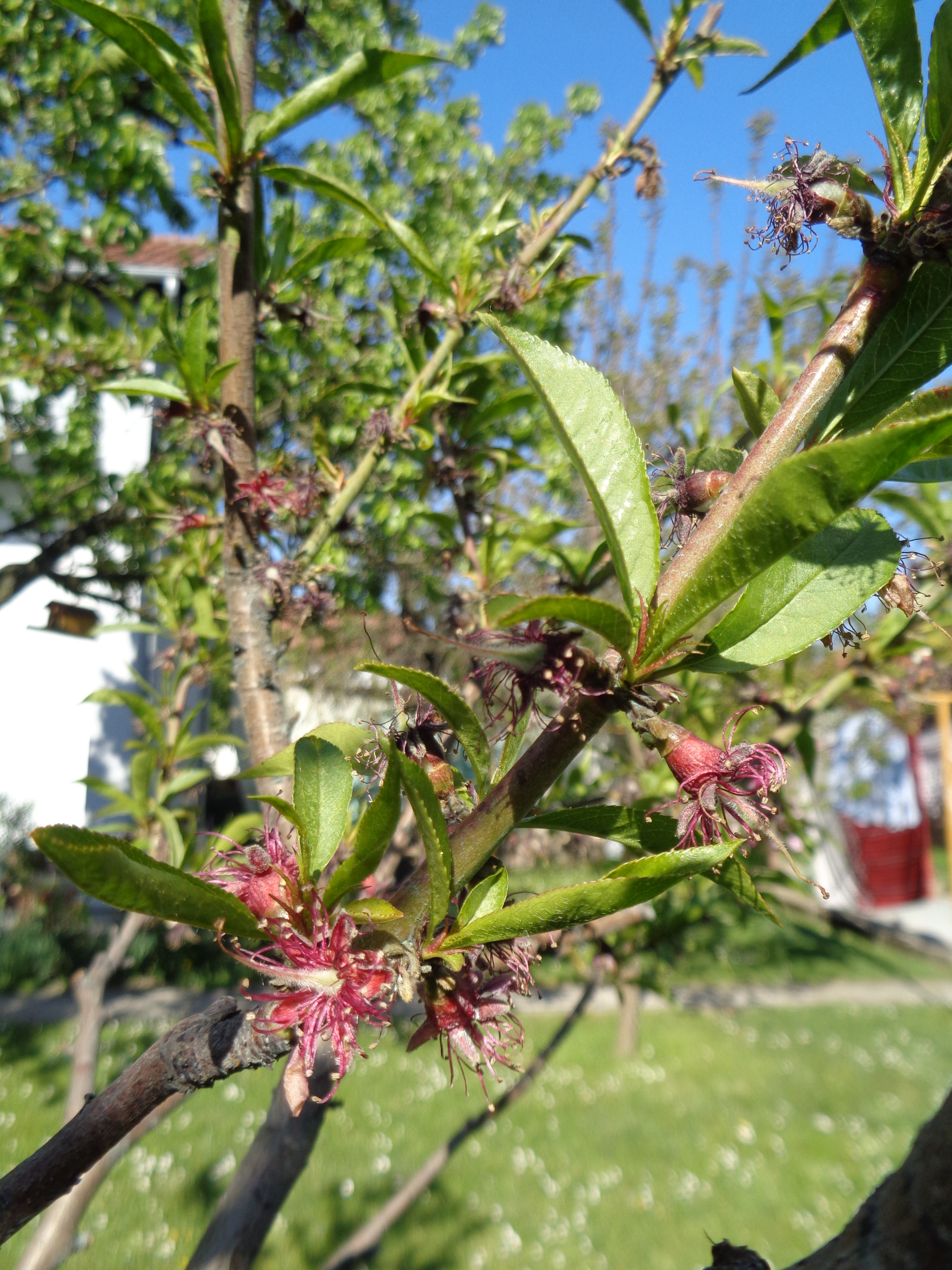
Incipient fruit development

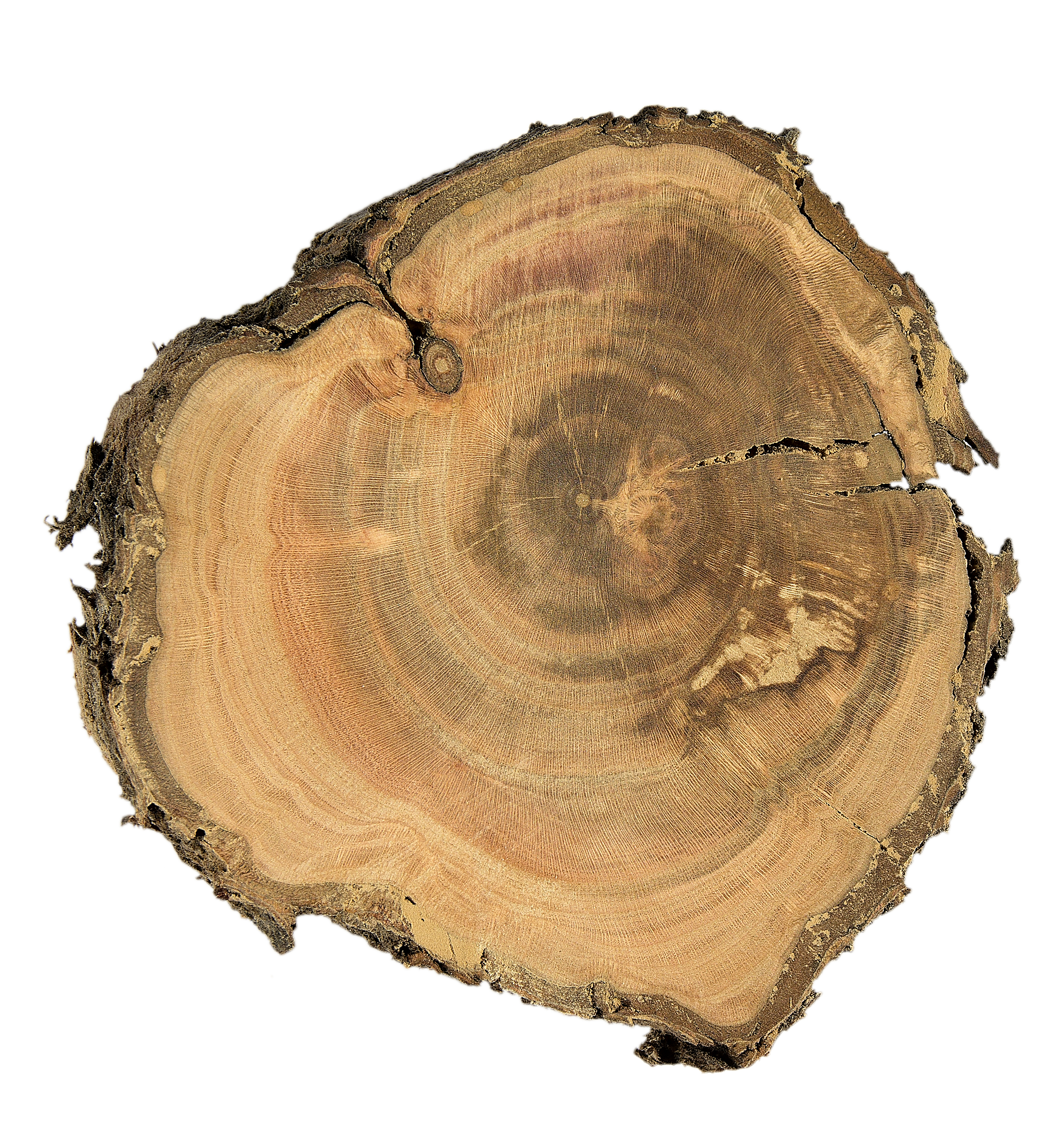

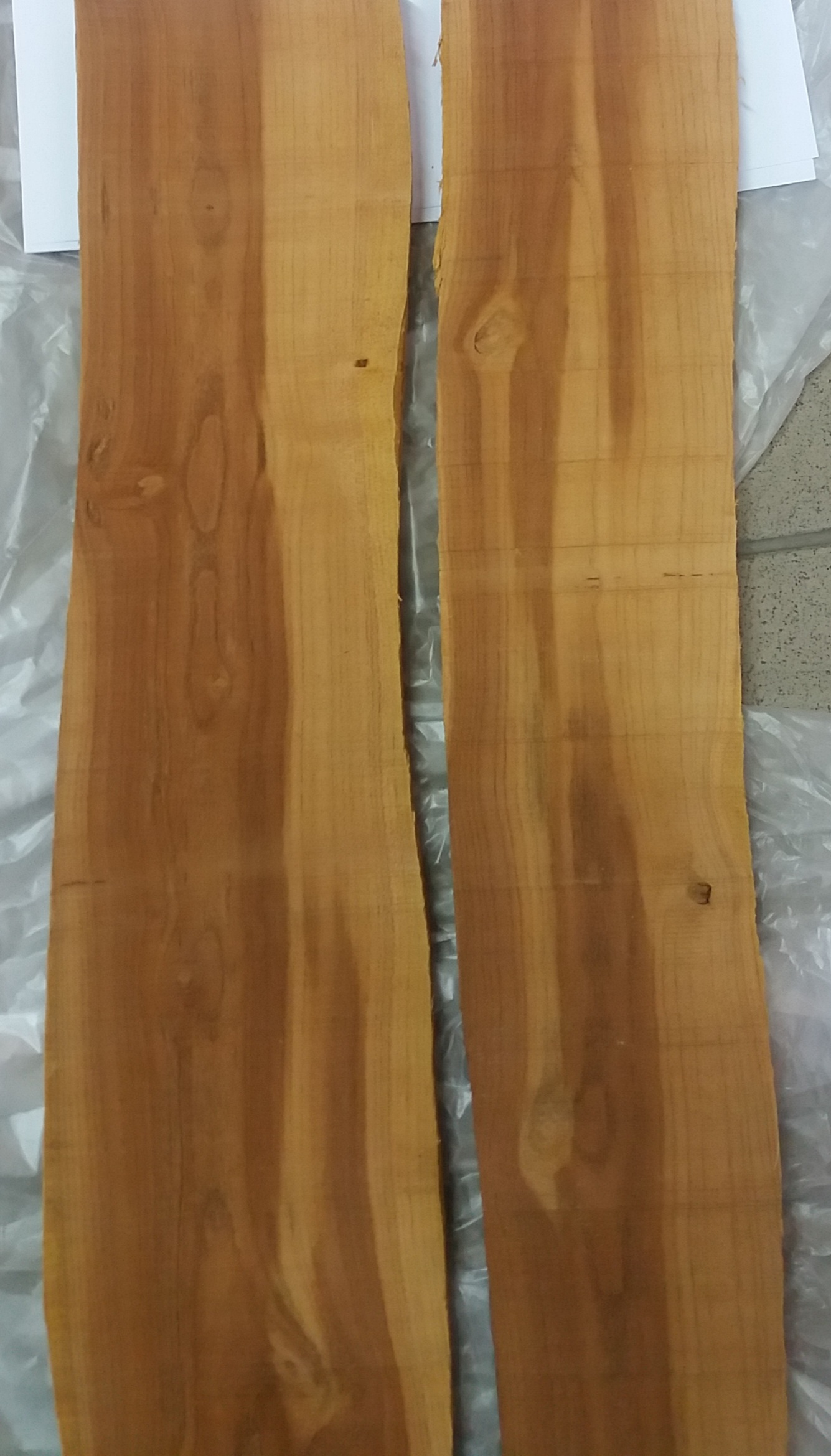
Color and grain of peach wood

Diagram of fruit and seed

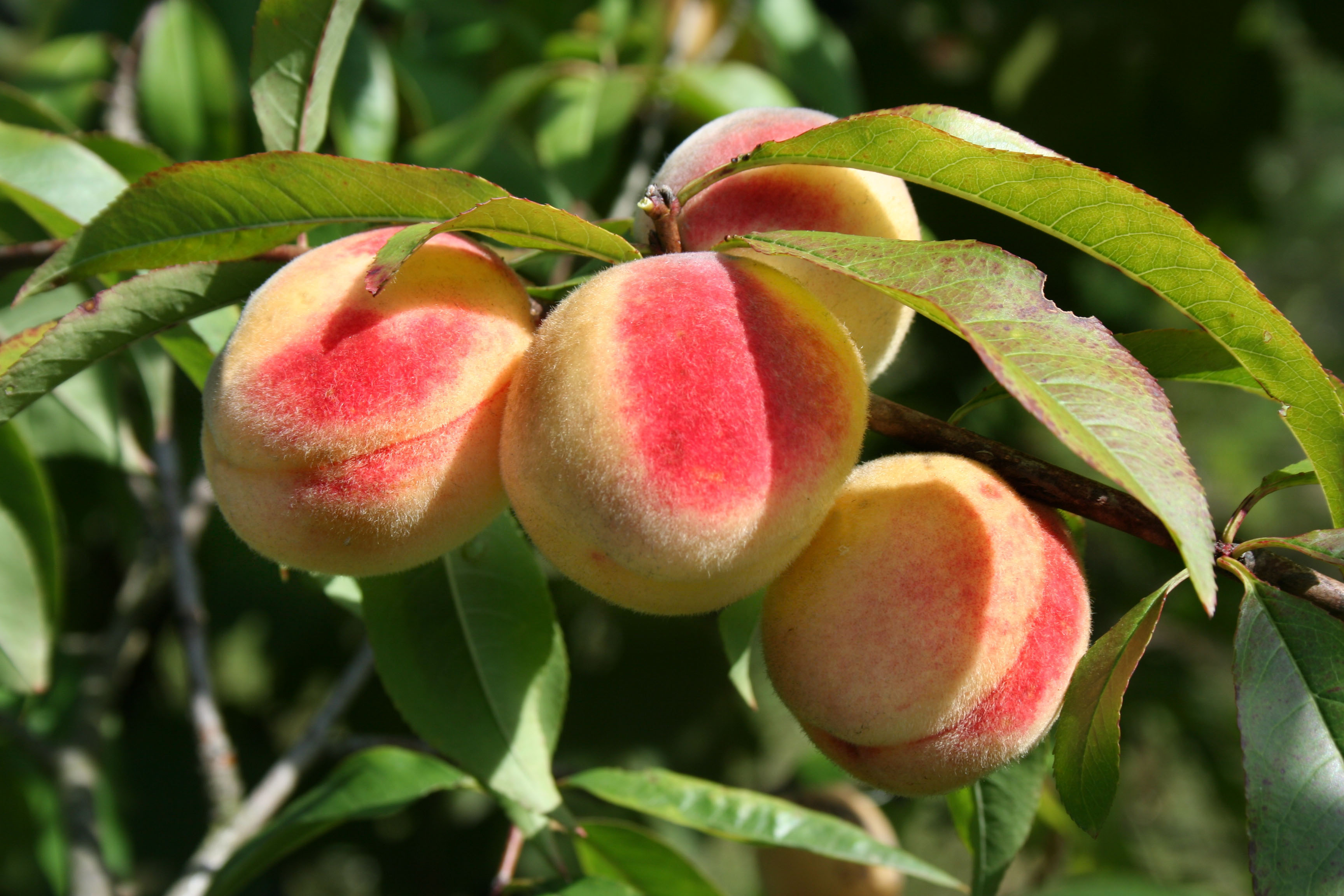

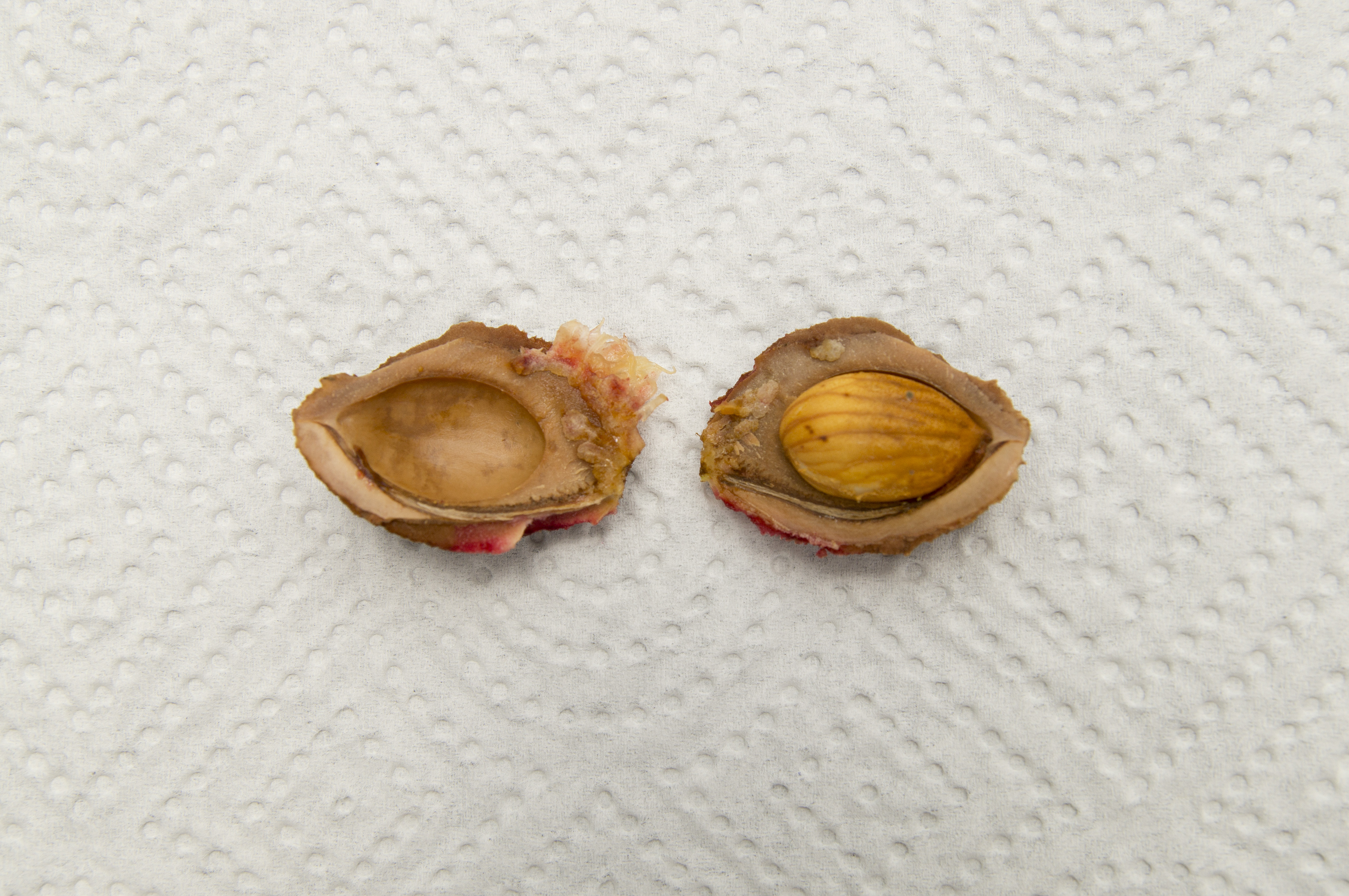

== Taxonomy ==
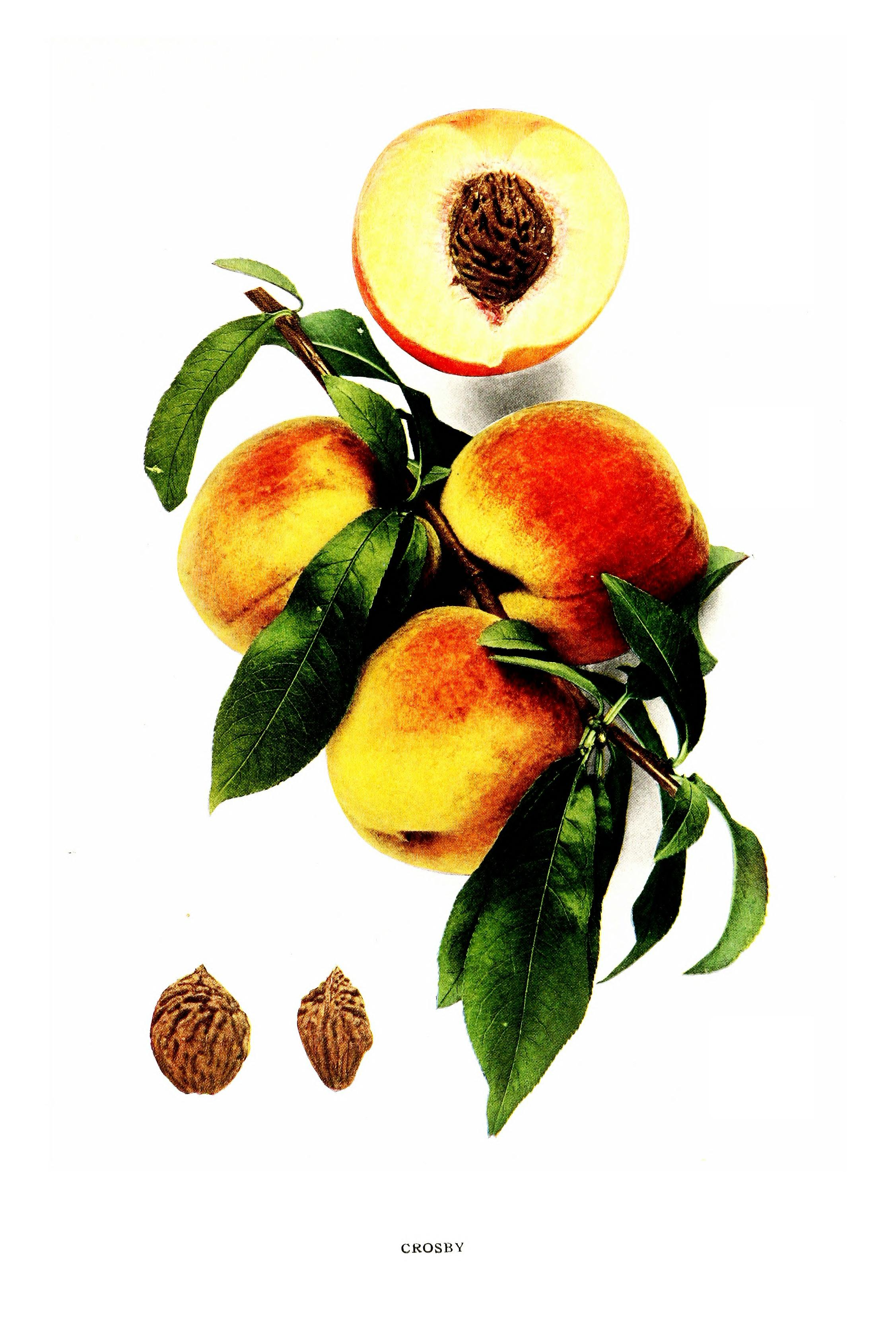
'Crosby' cultivar in The Peaches of New York, 1917

The peach tree was given the name Amygdalus persica by Carl Linnaeus in 1753 in his book Species plantarum. The accepted combination Prunus persica was published by August Batsch in 1801, though this was far from settled until the 20th century with many different placements of the peach and even divisions of nectarines and flat peaches into different species. The botanist Ulysses Prentiss Hedrick argued persuasively in 1917 that these differences are merely simple mutations and not species or even varieties, beginning consensus towards the modern classification. This was supported by breeding experiments as early as 1906 showing the hairlessness of nectarines is a recessive trait, though sometimes alternative names continue to be used even in the 21st century with Amygdalus persica being used as recently as 2003 in an authoritative scientific publication. More than 200 scientific names have been published that are considered synonyms of Prunus persica by Plants of the World Online (POWO). Though the majority of sources agree on its classification as Prunus persica, there is division on the correct author citation for the name. Most sources, such as POWO, World Flora Online, and the Flora of North America give August Batsch credit. However, a few sources such as World Plants maintained by the botanist Michael Hassler instead credit Jonathan Stokes with priority dated to 1812.

Prunus persica is classified in Prunus with other stone fruits within the rose family, Rosaceae. The further classification into a subgenus or section is disputed. The work of Alfred Rehder, published in 1940, has been widely used to group the species of Prunus. Rehder based his system largely on that of Bernhard Adalbert Emil Koehne with the peach placed with the almond in subgenus Amygdalus because similarities in the rough and pitted stone. However, since 2000 studies of nuclear and chloroplast DNA have shown that the five subgenera accepted by Rehder are not more closely related to each other than to other species in Prunus. In 2013 Shuo Shi and collaborators published research where they proposed it be part of subgenus Prunus together with the plums and cherries, but in a section named Persicae, now corrected to Persica. However, these groupings are not yet widely accepted.

The greatest genetic diversity in peaches is found in China, where it is generally agreed to have been domesticated. The species is often thought to be a cultigen, a taxon that has its origins in cultivation rather than as a wild species.

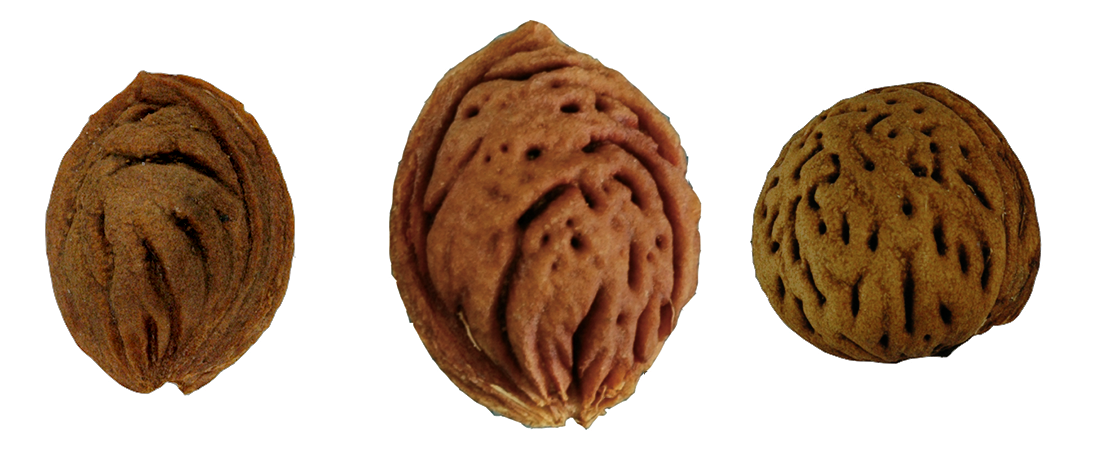
Prunus kansuensis (left), Prunus persica, feral type (center), and Prunus davidiana var. davidiana (right)

The closest relatives of the peach are the Chinese bush peach (Prunus kansuensis), Chinese wild peach (Prunus davidiana), the smooth stone peach (Prunus mira). Though Charles Darwin speculated that the peach might be a marvelous modification of the almond (Prunus amygdalus), research into the divergence of peach relatives shows this not to be the case. The almond, while in the same genus, is confirmed to be a more distant relative.

In April 2010, an international consortium, the International Peach Genome Initiative, which includes researchers from the United States, Italy, Chile, Spain, and France, announced they had sequenced the peach tree genome (doubled haploid Lovell). In 2013 they published the peach genome sequence and related analyses. The sequence is composed of 227 million nucleotides arranged in eight pseudomolecules representing the eight peach chromosomes (2n = 16). In addition, 27,852 protein-coding genes and 28,689 protein-coding transcripts were predicted.

Particular emphasis in this study is reserved for the analysis of the genetic diversity in peach germplasm and how it was shaped by human activities such as domestication and breeding. Major historical bottlenecks were found, one related to the putative original domestication that is supposed to have taken place in China about 4,000–5,000 years ago, the second is related to the western germplasm and is due to the early dissemination of the peach in Europe from China and the more recent breeding activities in the United States and Europe. These bottlenecks highlighted the substantial reduction of genetic diversity associated with domestication and breeding activities.

Though not a separate grouping genetically, nectarines are regarded as different fruits commercially. The difference is the lack of fuzz, the trichomes, on the skin of the fruits. Research into the cause of this trait found the transcription factor gene PpeMYB25 regulates the formation of trichomes on peach fruits. A mutation can cause a loss of function resulting in the changed fruit type.

=== Fossil record ===
Fossil endocarps with characteristics indistinguishable from those of modern peaches have been recovered from late Pliocene deposits in Kunming, dating to 2.6 million years ago. In the absence of evidence that the plants were in other ways identical to the modern peach, the name Prunus kunmingensis has been assigned to these fossils. Genetic evidence supports a very early emergence of edibility in the wild ancestors of the peach.

=== Names ===
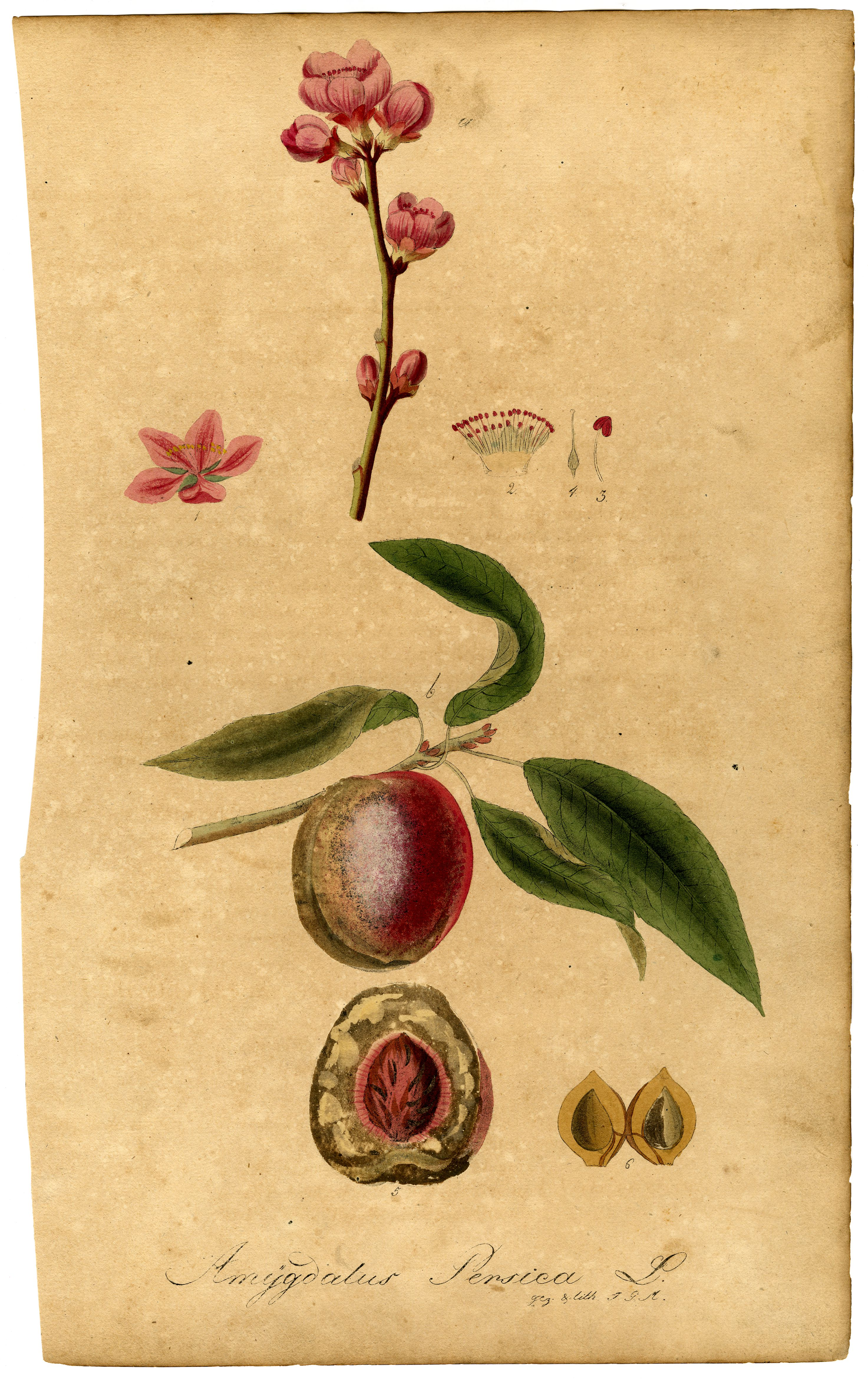
From Deutschlands wildwachsende Arzney-Pflanzen (Germany's Wild Medicinal Plants), 1828

The genus name Prunus is from the Latin for plum. The specific name persica was given by Linnaeus because European botanists of the 1700s and 1800s continued to believe the Roman accounts of peaches originating in Persia to be correct.

The modern English word, and its cognates in many European languages such as the German Pfirsich and Finnish persikka, have Latin origins. In ancient Rome the peach was called persicum malum or simply persicum meaning 'Persian apple'. This became the Late Latin pessica and in turn the medieval pesca. In Old French it was variously the peche, pesche, or peske. The first usage in England was as the surname Pecche in about 1184–1185. The French word was directly adopted into English to mean the fruit and spelled either pechis or peches around the year 1400. In 1605 the first known instance of the modern spelling of peach was published.

The various cultivars of peach with smooth-skinned fruits are called nectarines. This word was coined by English speakers, originally as an adjective meaning 'nectar-like', from nectar and the suffix -ine, with the first use in print in 1611.

== Distribution ==
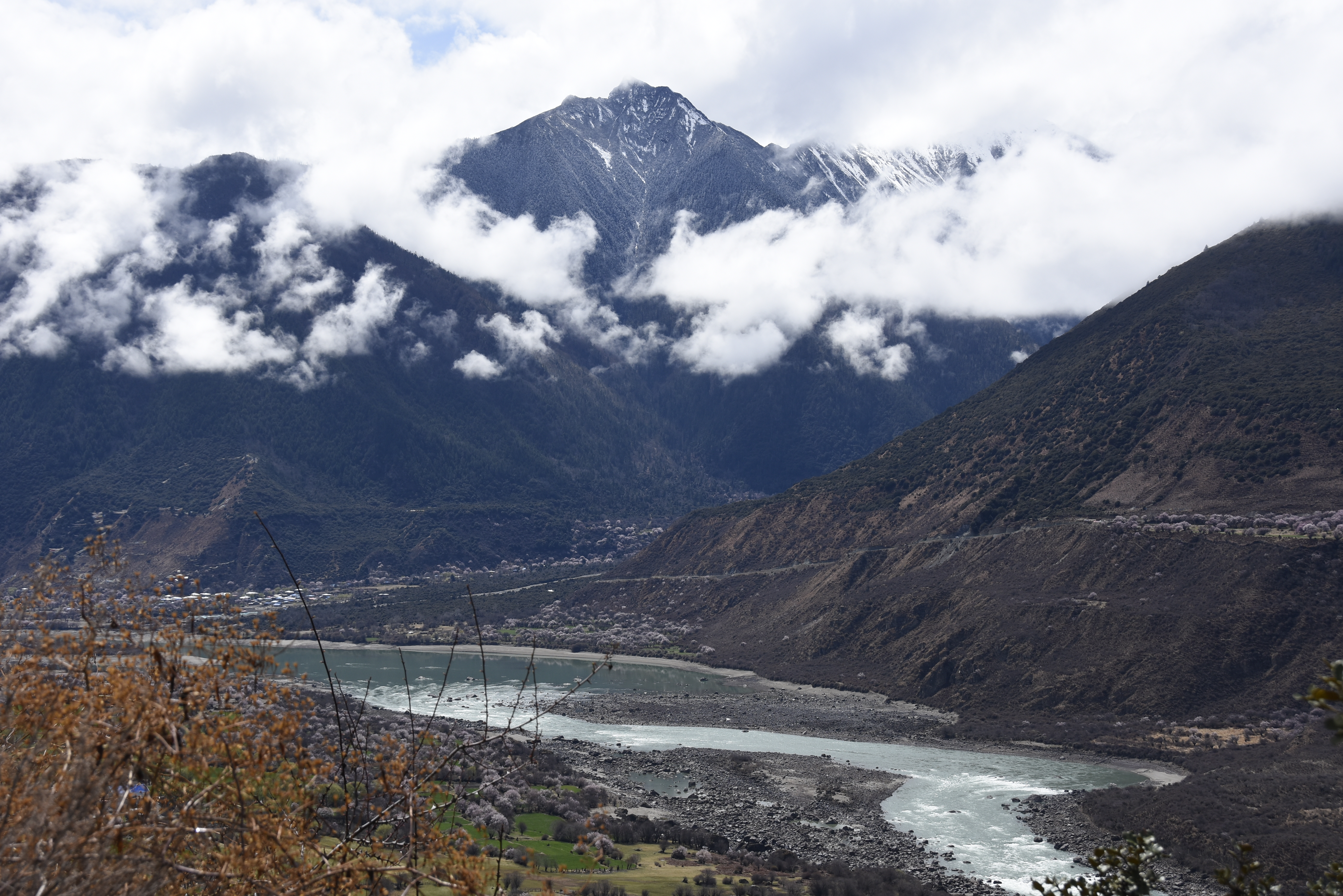
Peach trees blooming along the Yarlung Zangbo River, south-eastern Tibetan Plateau

The exact place of origin for the domestic peach is unknown. Based on archeology from the 2010s, East China near the Yangtze Delta has emerged as a likely candidate and contradicting the theory of domestication in Northwestern China. Many sources since the 1980s have listed North China as its likely place of origin. They are now naturalized in many other parts of Asia. It grows throughout eastern China and into Inner Mongolia. To the east they are found on the Korean Peninsula and in Japan. To the south they are found in Vietnam and Laos. In the Indian subcontinent are reported in the Eastern Himalayas and nearby Assam province, but not Nepal, parts of central India, Pakistan, and the Western Himalayas. Westwards they are an introduced species in Afghanistan, Iran, and all the countries of Central Asia. Transitioning to Europe they grow in the North Caucasus, Transcaucasus, and Turkey.

In Europe, the peach trees are partly naturalized. In western Europe they are found in Portugal, Spain, France, Ireland, and the United Kingdom. In central Europe they are reported as escaped from cultivation in Germany, Hungary, and Switzerland and in Corsica, Sardinia, Italy, Cyprus, and Greece in the south. In the southeast they grow as introduced plants in Slovenia, Croatia, Romania, and Bulgaria. To the east they are found in parts of European Russia, Ukraine, and Crimea.

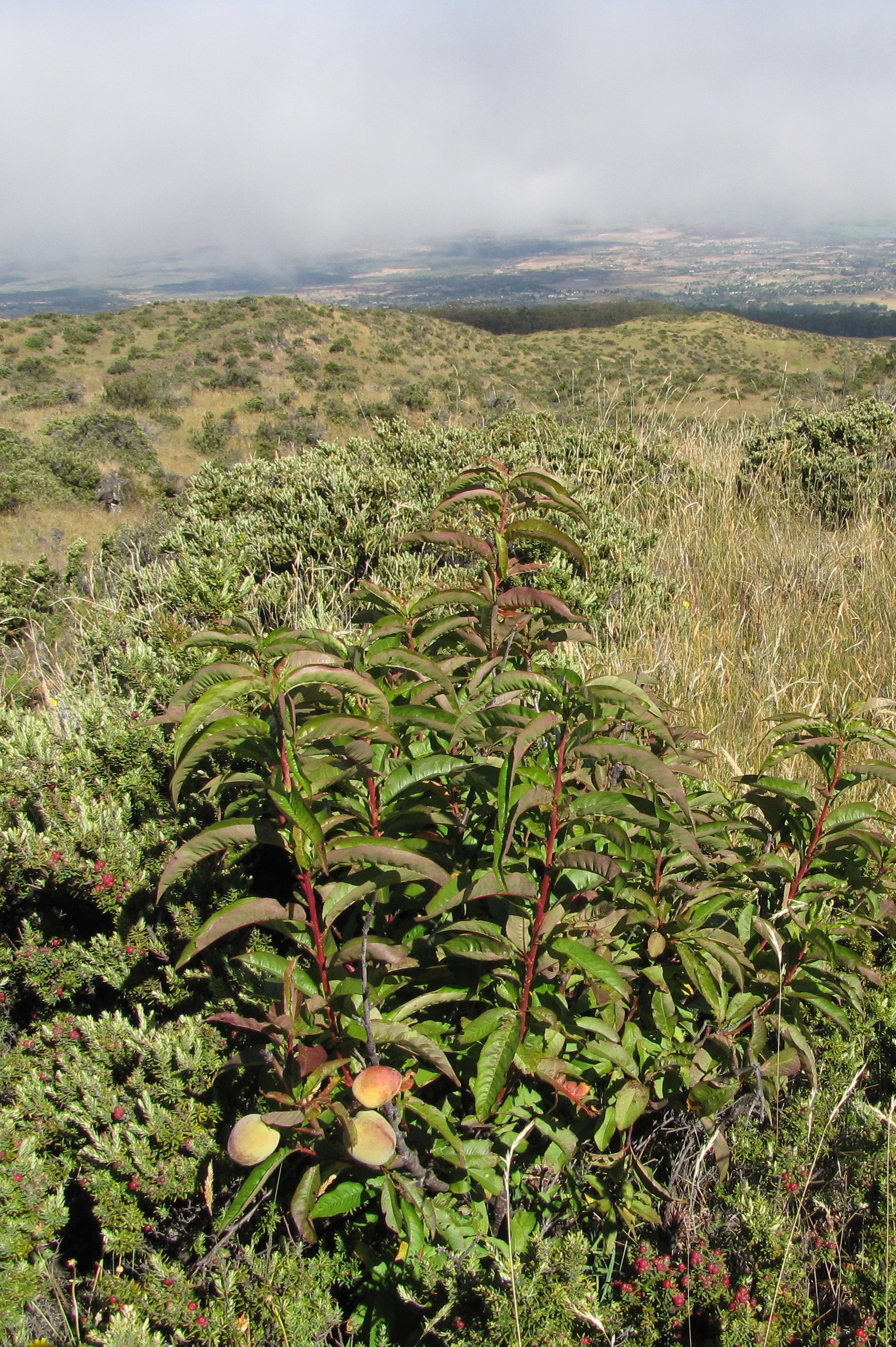
Feral peach Waiale Gulch, Maui, Hawaii

Peach trees have escaped from cultivation in the African nations of Libya, Ethiopia, Kenya, South Africa, and the Cape Verde Islands off the northeast coast. Specific areas of South Africa include the biogeographic areas of the Northern Provinces, Orange Free State, and KwaZulu-Natal.

In North America, in addition to cultivation, peach saplings are often found growing anywhere pits have been discarded. Most of these feral trees are short lived, but some have established naturalized populations. Such escapes are reported in the Canadian provinces of Ontario and Nova Scotia. Trees outside of cultivation have been found in all of the United States east of the Mississippi excluding Minnesota, Vermont, and New Hampshire. In the northwest, they are found in Oregon and Idaho. In the Southwestern United States, they are to some extent naturalized from California to Texas, with the exception of Nevada. The situation is similar in the northwest of Mexico and El Salvador in Central America. In South America, escapees are only reported from Ecuador and the northeast of Argentina.

In Australia, it is naturalized in the states of New South Wales, Queensland, Victoria, South Australia, and Western Australia. In New Zealand, it can be found as an escapee from cultivation on both the North Island and South Island, especially around Auckland, Christchurch, and in the Otago region. It is also naturalized on many oceanic islands including the Mariana Islands, Mauritius, Rodrigues, Réunion, and Saint Helena.

== Cultivation ==
=== History ===
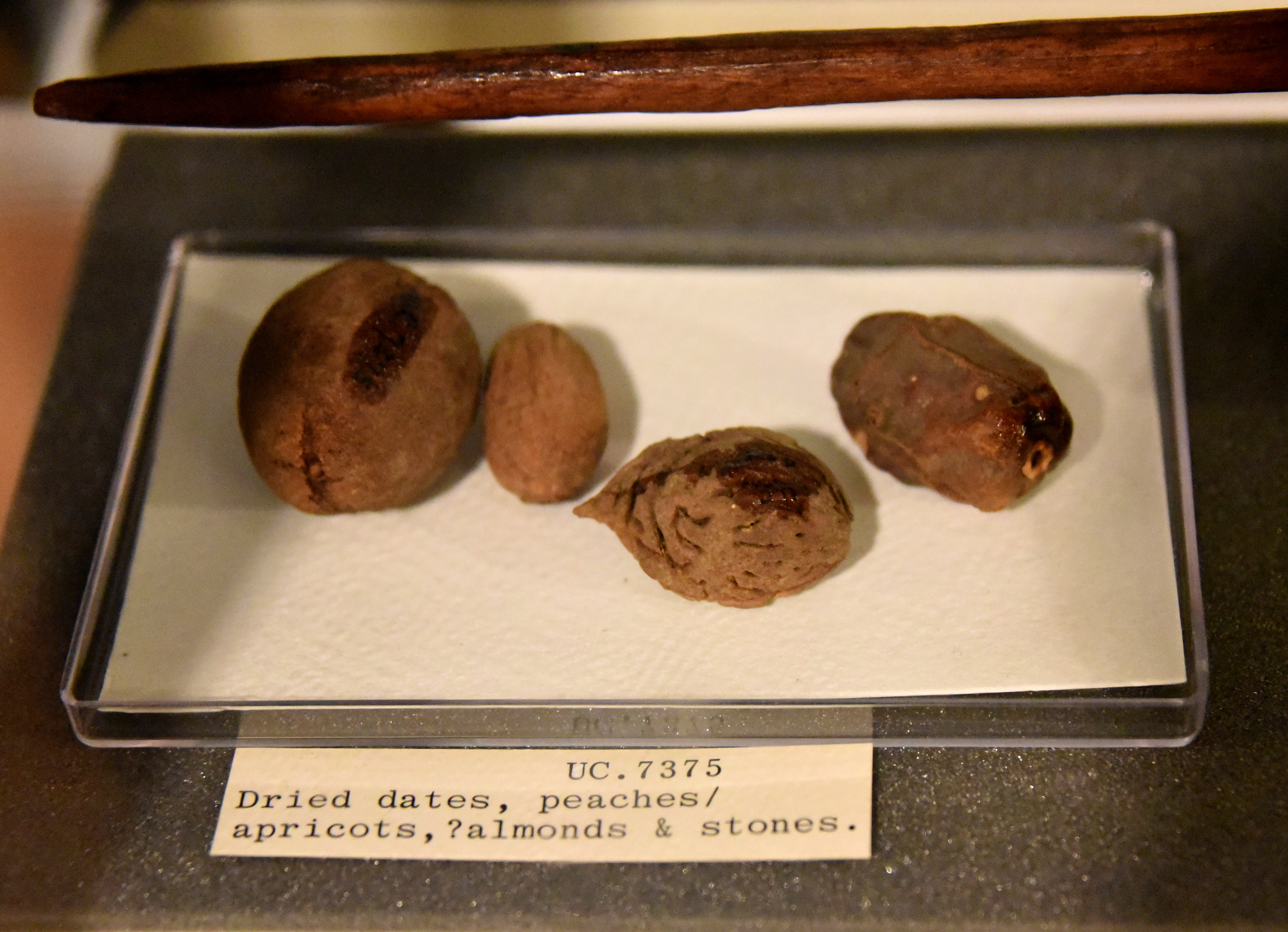
Dried date, peach, apricot, and stones from Lahun, Fayum, Egypt, Late Middle Kingdom, Petrie Museum of Egyptian Archaeology, London

Although its botanical name Prunus persica refers to Persia, peaches originated in China, where they have been cultivated since the Neolithic period. From the 1980s to the 2010s it was believed that cultivation started around 2000 BCE. In 2014 new research was published showing that domestication occurred as early as 6000 BCE in Zhejiang Province on the central east coast of China. The oldest archaeological peach stones are from the Kuahuqiao site near Hangzhou. Archaeologists point to the Yangtze River Valley as the place where the early selection for favorable peach varieties probably took place.

A domesticated peach appeared very early in Japan, in 4700–4400 BCE, during the Jōmon period. It was already similar to modern cultivated forms, where the peach stones are significantly larger and more compressed than earlier stones. This domesticated type of peach was brought into Japan from China. Nevertheless, in China itself, this variety is currently attested only at a later date around 3300 to 2300 BCE.

In India, the peach first appeared sometime between 2500 and 1700 BCE, during the Harappan period in the Kashmir. It was found elsewhere in West Asia in ancient times. Peach cultivation reached Greece by 300 BCE. Alexander the Great is sometimes said to have introduced them into Greece after conquering Persia, but no historical evidence for this claim has been found. Peaches were, however, well known to the Romans in the first century CE; the oldest known artistic representations of the fruit are in two fragments of wall paintings, dated to the first century CE, in Herculaneum, preserved due to the Vesuvius eruption of 79 CE, and now held in the National Archaeological Museum in Naples. Archaeological finds show that peaches were cultivated widely in Roman northwestern Continental Europe, but production collapsed around the sixth century; some revival of production followed with the Carolingian Renaissance of the ninth century.

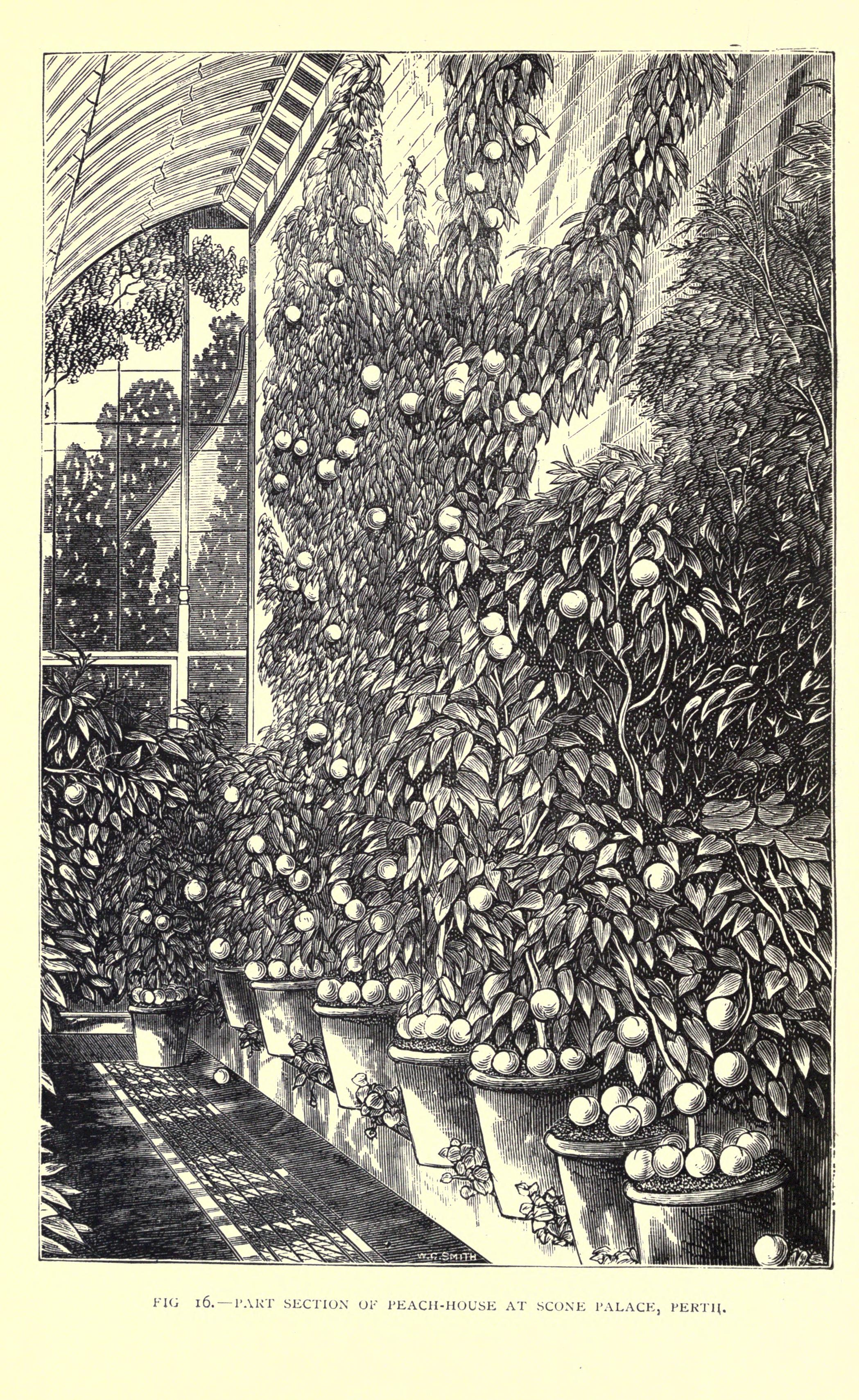
Illustration of the peach-house at Scone Palace, Scotland

An article on peach tree cultivation in Spain is brought down in Ibn al-'Awwam's 12th-century agricultural work, Book on Agriculture. The peach was brought to the Americas by Spanish explorers in the 16th century, and eventually made it to England and France in the 17th century, where it was a prized and expensive treat. Although Thomas Jefferson had peach trees at Monticello, American farmers did not begin commercial production until the 19th century in Maryland, Delaware, Georgia, South Carolina, and finally Virginia.

The Shanghai honey nectar peach was a key component of both the food culture and the agrarian economy in the area where the modern megacity of Shanghai stands. Peaches were the cornerstone of early Shanghai's garden culture. As modernization and westernization swept through the city the Shanghai honey nectar peach nearly disappeared completely. Much of modern Shanghai is built over these gardens and peach orchards.

The first European botanist to argue that the peach did not originate in Persia was Augustin Pyramus de Candolle in 1855. He argued on the basis of it not being mentioned by Xenophon in 401 BCE or by other early sources that it could not have arrived there much before it was imported to Rome in the 100s BCE. An important western botanist to argue for a Chinese origin of the species was Ulysses Prentiss Hedrick in 1917. Chinese literature records the fruit for at least 1,000 years before its appearance in Europe.

==== Americas ====
Peaches were introduced into the Americas in the 16th century by the Spanish. By 1580, peaches were being grown in Latin America and were cultivated by the remnants of the Inca Empire in Argentina.

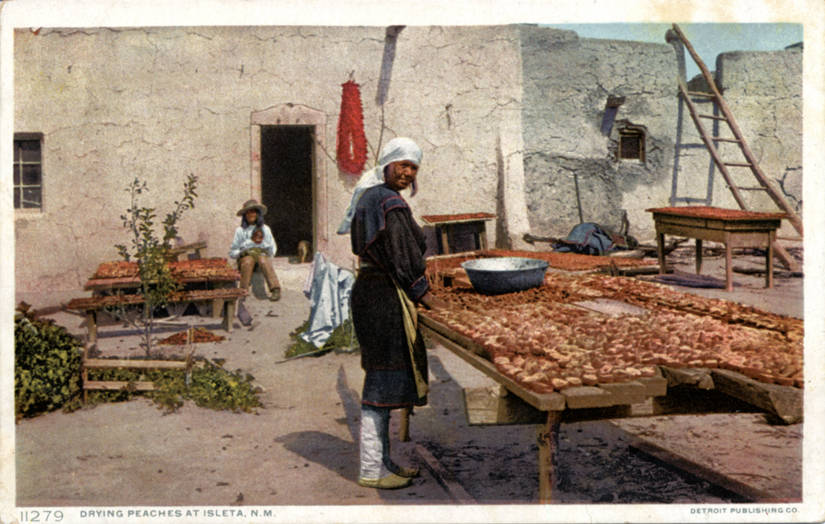
Drying peaches at Pueblo of Isleta, New Mexico c. 1900

In the United States the peach was soon adopted as a crop by American Indians. In the eastern U.S. the peach became naturalized and abundant as a feral species. Peaches were being grown in Virginia as early as 1629. Peaches grown by Indians in Virginia were said to have been "of greater variety and finer sorts" than those of the English colonists. Also in 1629, peaches were listed as a crop in New Mexico. William Penn noted the existence of wild peaches in Pennsylvania in 1683. In fact, peaches may have already spread to the American Southeast by the early to mid 1600s, actively cultivated by indigenous communities such as the Muscogee before permanent Spanish settlement of the region.

Peach plantations became an objective of American military campaigns against the Indians. In 1779, the Sullivan Expedition destroyed the livelihood of many of the Iroquois people of New York. Among the crops destroyed were plantations of peach trees. In 1864, Kit Carson led a successful U.S. army expedition to Canyon de Chelly in Arizona to destroy the livelihood of the Navajo. Carson destroyed thousands of peach trees. A soldier said they were the "best peach trees I have ever seen in the country, every one of them bearing fruit." The Navajo signed a treaty with the US government in 1868 and were able to return to the canyon. They had saved peach pits and some trees resprouted from stumps and so by the 1870s and 1880s many peach orchards had been restored.

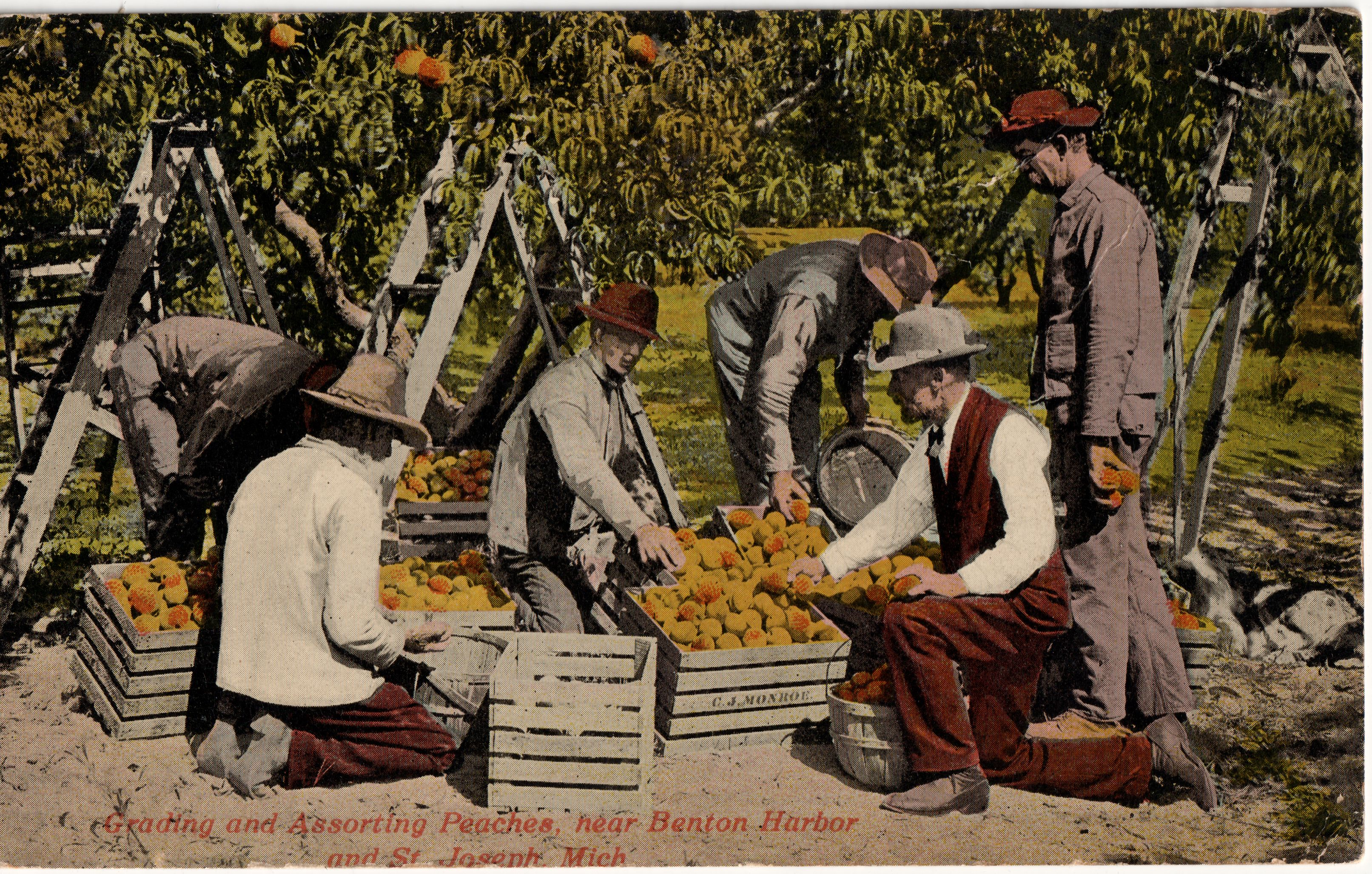
Grading and assorting peaches near Benton Harbor and St Joseph, Michigan, about 1913

=== Growing conditions ===
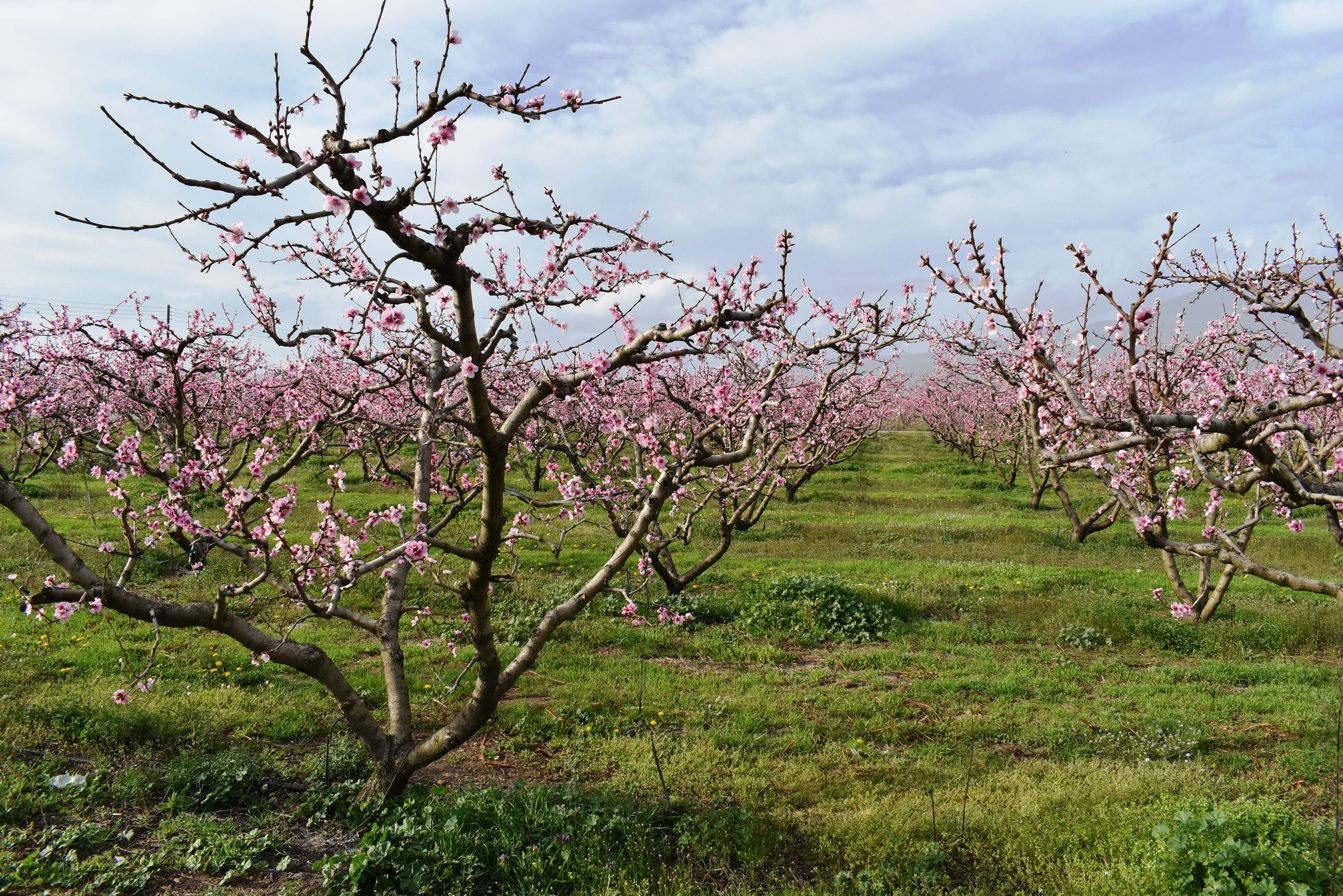
Peach orchard, Northern Greece

Peaches are easiest to grow in dry, continental or temperate climates, with conditions of high humidity greatly increasing diseases and pests in subtropics and tropics. In addition the trees have a chilling requirement. Most cultivars require 600 to 1,000 hours of chilling at temperatures between 4 and 10 °C (40 and 50 °F). During the chilling period, key chemical reactions occur, but the plant appears dormant. Temperatures under −1 °C (30 °F) are ineffective for fulfilling the chilling requirement. Once the chilling period is fulfilled, the plant enters a second type of dormancy, the quiescence period. During quiescence, buds break and grow when sufficient warm weather favorable to growth is accumulated. The chilling requirement is not satisfied in tropical or subtropical areas except at high altitudes with low-chill cultivars, some which require less than 100 hours of suitable temperatures.

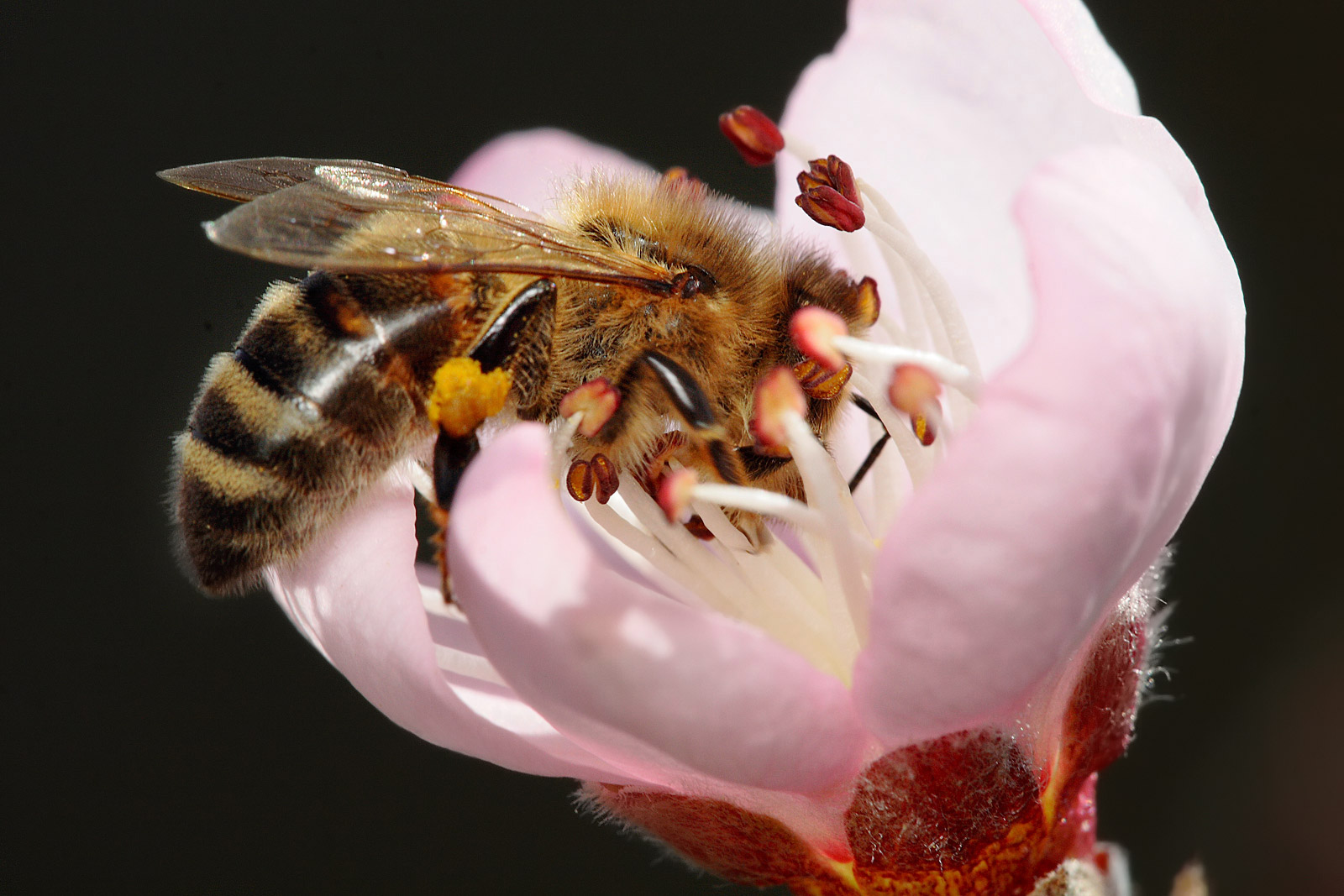
A peach flower with a bee pollinating it

The trees themselves can usually tolerate temperatures to around −26 to −30 °C (−15 to −22 °F), although the following season's flower buds are usually killed at these temperatures, preventing a crop that summer. Flower bud death begins to occur between −15 and −25 °C (5 and −13 °F), depending on the cultivar and on the timing of the cold, with the buds becoming less cold tolerant in late winter. Another climate constraint is spring frost. The trees flower fairly early and the blossom is damaged or killed if temperatures drop below about −1.1 °C (30.0 °F). If the flowers are not fully open, though, they can tolerate a few degrees colder. The flowers are vulnerable to temperatures higher than 22 to 25 °C (72 to 77 °F) during the day.

Climates with significant winter rainfall at temperatures below 16 °C (61 °F) are unsuitable for peach cultivation, as the rain promotes peach leaf curl, which is the most serious fungal disease for peaches. In practice, fungicides are extensively used for peach cultivation in such climates, with more than 1% of European peaches exceeding legal pesticide limits in 2013.

Peach trees are grown in well draining soils as they are vulnerable to disease in wet soils. They are most productive in topsoils approximately 45 to 60 centimetres (18 to 24 in) with a sandy loam character.

Most peach trees sold by nurseries are cultivars budded or grafted onto a suitable rootstock. Common rootstocks are 'Lovell Peach', 'Nemaguard Peach', Prunus besseyi, and 'Citation'. The Royal Horticultural Society recommends Saint Julian A and Torinel.

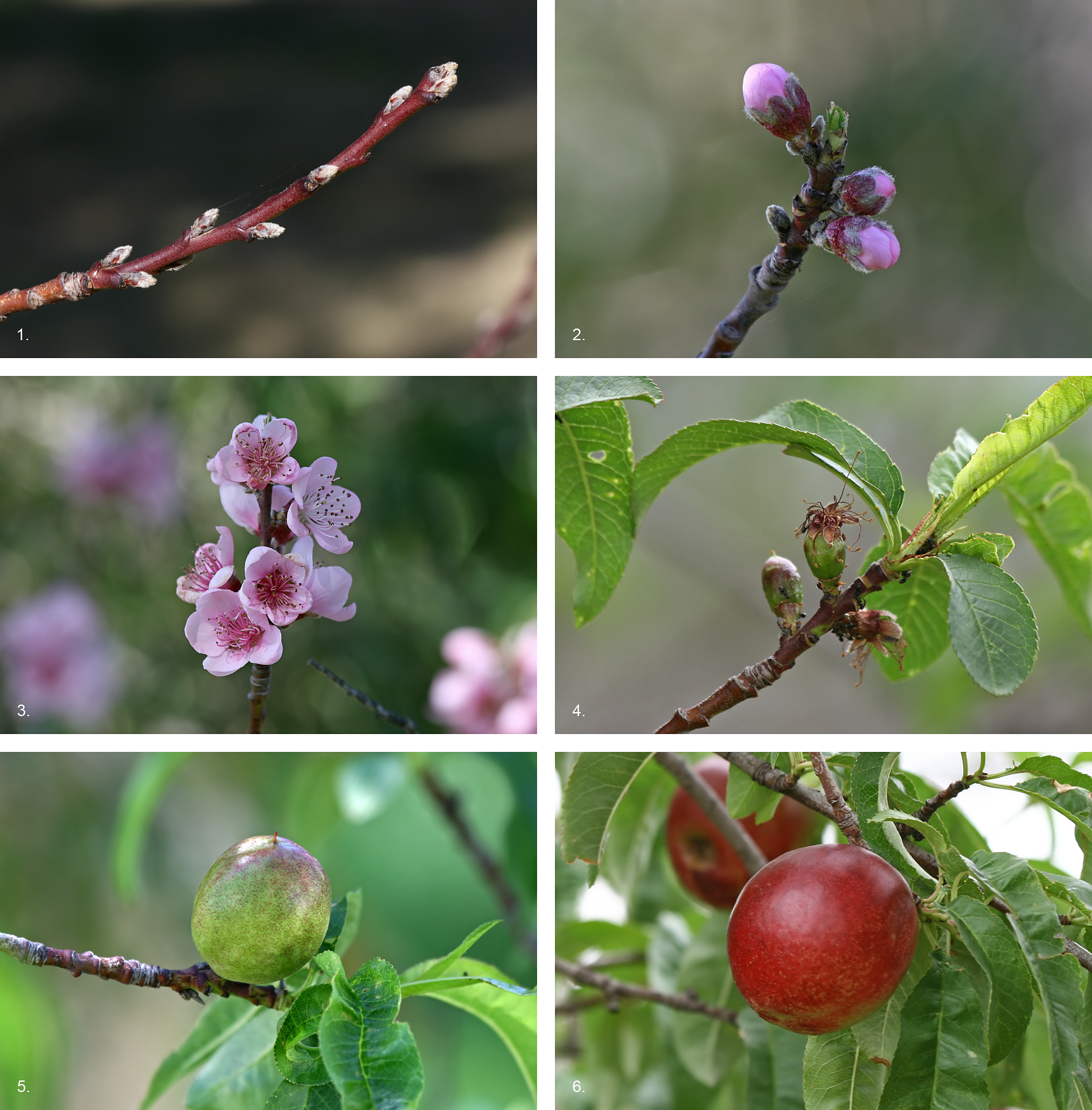
The developmental sequence of a nectarine over a 7 1/2-month period, from bud formation in early winter to fruit ripening in midsummer

Typical peach cultivars begin bearing fruit in their third year. Their lifespan in the U.S. varies by region; the University of California, Davis gives a lifespan of about 15 years while the University of Maine gives a lifespan of 7 years there.

Peach trees need full sun, and a layout that allows good natural air flow to assist the thermal environment for the tree. Peaches are planted in early winter. During the growth season, they need a regular and reliable supply of water, with higher amounts just before harvest. With periodic mulching, additional nutrients are generally not required for trees in soil. Peach trees can be grown in an espalier shape against a south-facing wall.

The flowers on a peach tree are typically thinned out because if the full number of peaches mature on a branch, they are undersized and lack flavor. Fruits are thinned midway in the season by commercial growers. Fresh peaches are easily bruised, so do not store well. They are most flavorful when they ripen on the tree and are eaten the day of harvest.

=== Storage ===
Peaches and nectarines are best stored at temperatures of 0 °C (32 °F) and in high humidity. They are highly perishable, so are typically consumed or canned within two weeks of harvest.

Peaches are climacteric fruits and continue to ripen after being picked from the tree. However, though climacteric fruits continue to ripen nutritional quality may not improve after picking with studies showing Vitamin C content to be higher in peaches when ripened on the tree. Both ethylene and the plant hormone auxin are involved in regulating the ripening process. Though the ethylene antagonist 1-methylcyclopropene can be used to delay the ripening of peaches its use negatively affects the aroma of the fruit.

=== Insects ===
The larvae of moth species of concern to peach growers include especially the peachtree borer (Synanthedon exitiosa), the peach twig borer (Anarsia lineatella), the yellow peach moth (Conogethes punctiferalis), the fruit tree leafroller (Archips argyrospila), oriental fruit moths (Grapholita molesta), and the lesser peachtree borer (Synanthedon pictipes). Many other moth caterpillars are commercial pests. (Note: Other pests of peach include the well-marked cutworm (Abagrotis orbis), the climbing cutworm (Abagrotis barnesi), Lyonetia prunifoliella, the grey dagger (Acronicta psi), ghost moth (Aenetus virescens), the march moth (Alsophila aescularia), fruit tree tortrix (Archips podanus), cherry fruit moth (Argyresthia pruniella), azalea leafminer Caloptilia zachrysa, peach fruit moth (Carposina sasakii), apple leaf skeletonizer (Choreutis pariana), honeydew moth (Cryptoblabes gnidiella), plum fruit moth (Cydia funebrana), codling moth (Cydia pomonella), figure of eight (Diloba caeruleocephala), cherry bark tortrix (Enarmonia formosana), apple leaf roller (Epiphyas postvittana), brown-tail moth (Euproctis chrysorrhoea), the fruit tree borer (Maroga melanostigma), winter moth (Operophtera brumata), fruit-tree tortrix (Pandemis heparana), the wood groundling (Parachronistis albiceps), apple leaf miner Phyllonorycter crataegella, lesser bud moth (Recurvaria nanella), and false codling moth (Thaumatotibia leucotreta).)

The tree is a host for such species as the Japanese beetle (Popillia japonica), the shothole borer (Scolytus rugulosus), and plum curculio (Conotrachelus nenuphar). Green peach aphids (Myzus persicae) can be a significant problem on peach trees. They overwinter as eggs on the trees and feed upon them in the spring before moving to other host species during the summer. Two scale insects can cause serious damage to peach trees, the white peach scale (Pseudaulacaspis pentagona) and the San Jose scale (Comstockaspis perniciosa).

At best, the peach is a poor nectar and pollen source for honey bees, with the double flowering varieties particularly noted for not producing any usable resources for bees. Some fruiting cultivars produce no pollen, while nectar flow is often impacted by early frosts.

=== Diseases ===
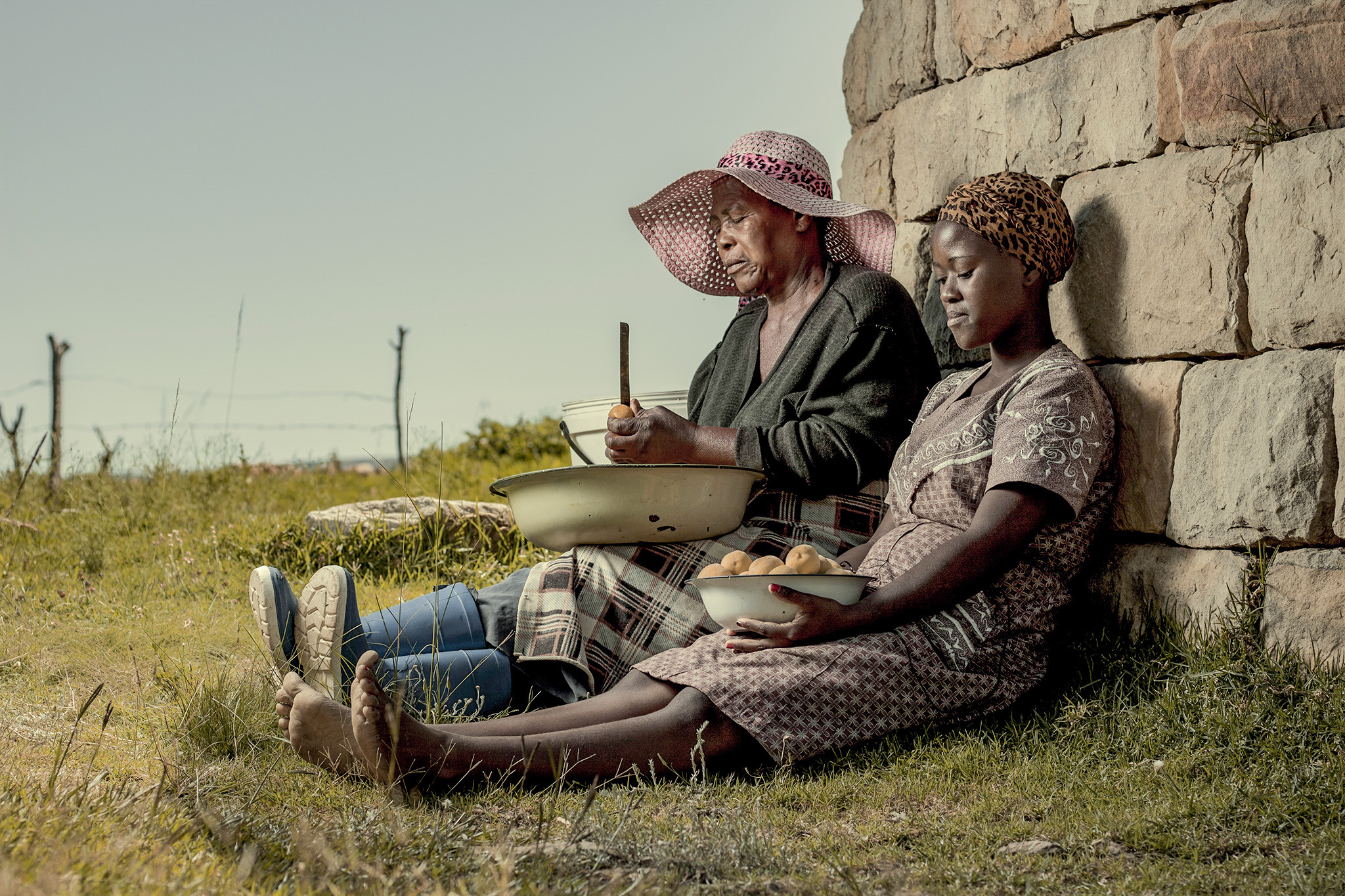
Women preparing peaches in Lesotho, Africa

Peach trees are prone to a disease called leaf curl, which usually does not directly affect the fruit, but does reduce the crop yield by partially defoliating the tree. Several fungicides can be used to combat the disease, including Bordeaux mixture and other copper-based products (the University of California considers these organic treatments), ziram, chlorothalonil, and dodine. The fruit is susceptible to diseases including brown rot, bacterial spot, and peach scab.

=== Cultivars ===
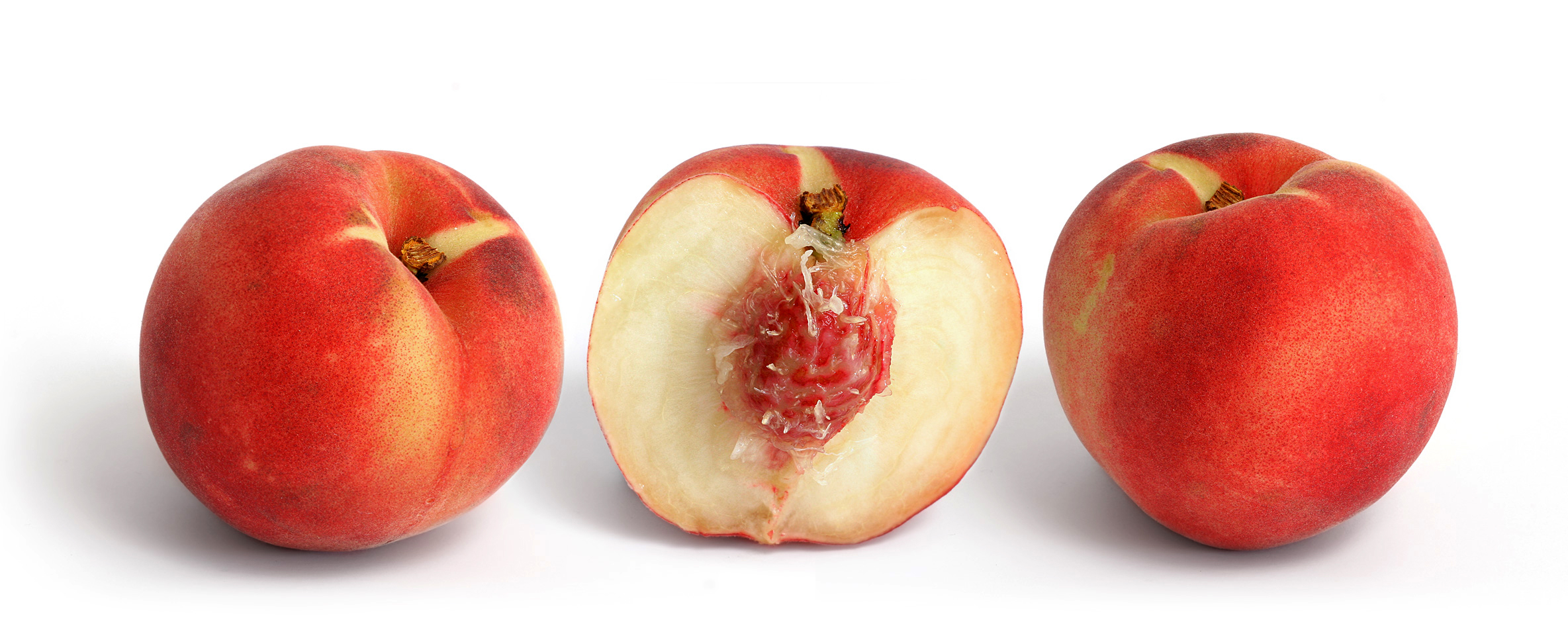
White peach of the clingstone variety

Hundreds of peach and nectarine cultivars are known. These are classified into two categories—freestones and clingstones. Freestones are those whose flesh separates readily from the pit. Clingstones are those whose flesh clings tightly to the pit. Some cultivars are partially freestone and clingstone, so are called semifree. Freestone types are preferred for eating fresh, while clingstone types are for canning. The fruit flesh may be creamy white to deep yellow, to dark red; the hue and shade of the color depend on the cultivar. The genetic diversity of peach cultivars is highest in China with 495 recognized cultivars.

Peach breeding has favored cultivars with more firmness, more red color, and shorter fuzz on the fruit surface. These characteristics ease shipping and supermarket sales by improving eye appeal. This selection process has not necessarily led to increased flavor, though. Peaches have a short shelf life, so commercial growers typically plant a mix of different cultivars to have fruit to ship all season long.

==== Nectarines ====
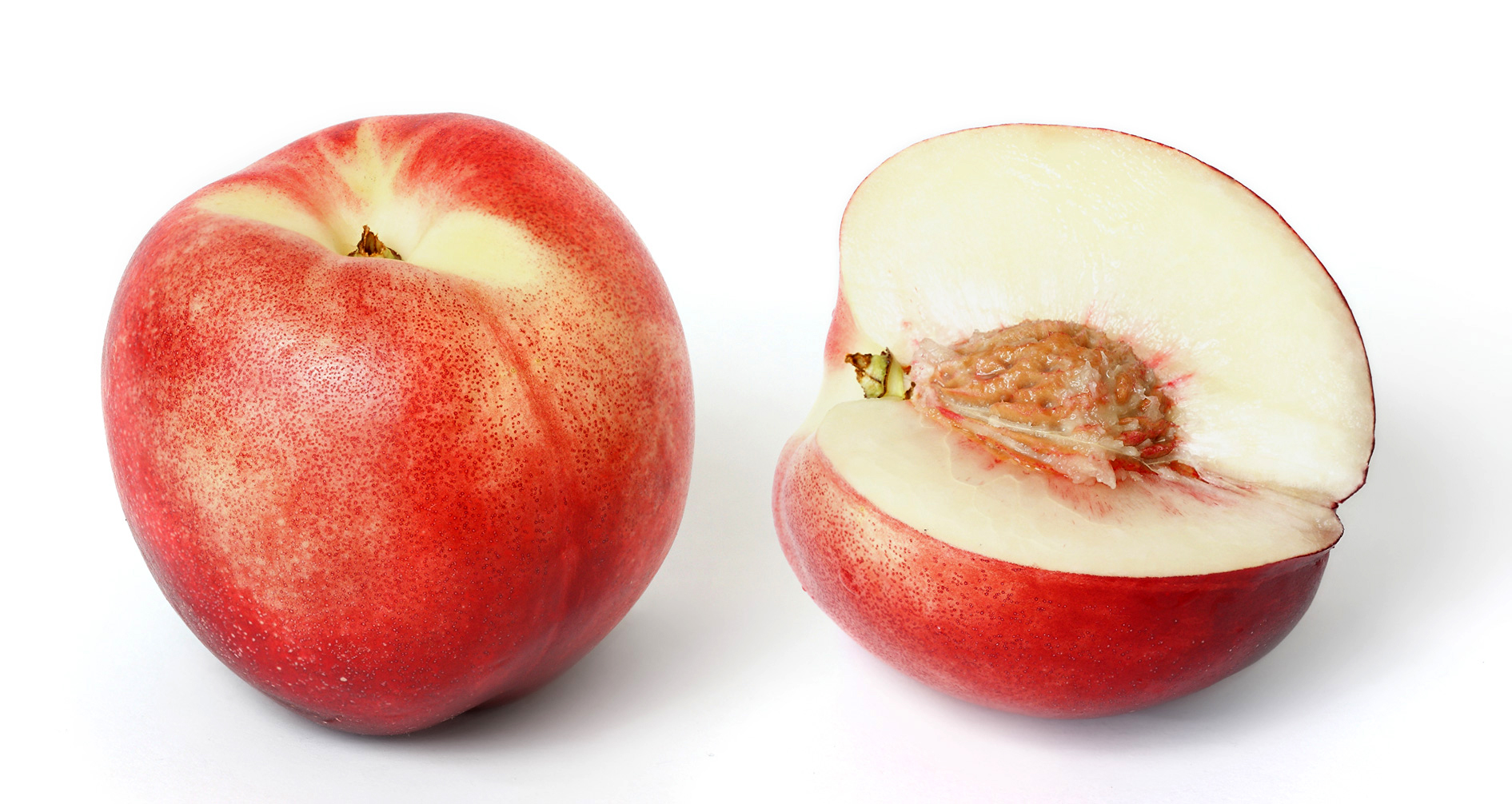
White nectarines, whole and cut open

The cultivars commonly called nectarines have a smooth skin. It is on occasion referred to as a "shaved peach" or "fuzzless peach", due to its lack of fuzz or short hairs. Though fuzzy peaches and nectarines are regarded commercially as different fruits, with nectarines often erroneously believed to be a crossbreed between peaches and plums, or a "peach with a plum skin", nectarines belong to the same species as peaches. Several genetic studies have concluded nectarines are produced due to a recessive allele, whereas a fuzzy peach skin is dominant.

As with peaches, nectarines can be white or yellow, and clingstone or freestone. On average, nectarines are slightly smaller and sweeter than peaches, but with much overlap. The lack of skin fuzz can make nectarine skins appear more reddish than those of peaches, contributing to the fruit's plum-like appearance.

The history of the nectarine is unclear; the first recorded mention in English is from 1611, but they had probably been grown much earlier within the native range of the peach in central and eastern Asia. A number of colonial-era newspaper articles make reference to nectarines being grown in the United States prior to the Revolutionary War. The 28 March 1768 edition of the New York Gazette (p. 3), for example, mentions a farm in Jamaica, Long Island, New York, where nectarines were grown. Later, cultivars of higher quality with better shipping qualities were introduced to the United States by David Fairchild of the Department of Agriculture in 1906.

==== Other varieties ====
Peacherines are claimed to be a cross between a peach and a nectarine; they are sometimes marketed in Australia and New Zealand. Flat peaches, or pan-tao, have a flattened shape, in contrast to ordinary near-spherical peaches. Peach trees with small, inedible fruits are sometimes grown for ornamental value in gardens.

== Production ==
Production of peaches and nectarines 2024, millions of tonnes
China	17.6
Spain	1.4
Turkey	1.2
Italy	1.1
United States	0.8
Iran	0.6
World	27.9
Source: FAOSTAT, United Nations

In 2024, world production of peaches (combined with nectarines for reporting) was 28 million tonnes, led by China with 63% of the total; Spain, Turkey, and Italy were secondary producers (table).

Peach and nectarine yield

Production of peaches and nectarines

== Nutrition ==
Peaches, yellow, raw
Nutritional value per 100 g (3.5 oz)
- Energy: 46 kcal (190 kJ)
- Carbohydrates: 9.87 g
- Sugars sucrose glucose fructose: 8.39 g 4.8 g 1.9 g 1.5 g
- Dietary fiber: 1.5 g
- Fat: 0.27 g
- Protein: 0.91 g
Vitamins and minerals
Vitamins	Quantity %DV^{†}
Vitamin A equiv. beta-Carotene	3% 24 μg 2% 224 μg
Thiamine (B1)	2% 0.024 mg
Riboflavin (B2)	2% 0.031 mg
Niacin (B3)	5% 0.806 mg
Pantothenic acid (B5)	3% 0.153 mg
Vitamin B6	1% 0.025 mg
Folate (B9)	2% 6 μg
Vitamin C	5% 4.1 mg
Vitamin E	5% 0.73 mg
Vitamin K	3% 3 μg
Minerals	Quantity %DV^{†}
Calcium	0% 4 mg
Copper	9% 0.078 mg
Iron	2% 0.34 mg
Magnesium	2% 8 mg
Manganese	1% 0.026 mg
Phosphorus	2% 22 mg
Potassium	4% 122 mg
Sodium	1% 13 mg
Zinc	2% 0.23 mg
- Other constituents: Quantity
- Water: 88 g
- Link to Full Nutrient Report of USDA FoodData Central
- ^{†}Percentages estimated using US recommendations for adults, except for potassium, which is estimated based on expert recommendation from the National Academies.

Raw peach flesh is 88% water, 10% carbohydrates, 1% protein, and contains negligible fat. A medium-sized raw peach, weighing 100 grams (3.5 oz), supplies 46 calories, and contains no micronutrients having a significant percentage of the Daily Value (DV, table).

Sucrose accounts for 57% of the sweetness of a raw peach, with glucose and fructose accounting for the remainder of sugars (table). The glycemic load of an average peach (120 grams) is 5, similar to other low-sugar fruits.

A raw nectarine has a similar low nutrient content.

== Phytochemicals ==
Total polyphenols in mg per 100 g of fresh weight were 14–113 in white-flesh nectarines, 17–78 in yellow-flesh nectarines, 20–113 in white-flesh peaches, and 16–93 mg per 100 g in yellow-flesh peaches. The major phenolic compounds identified in peach are chlorogenic acid, catechins and epicatechins, with other compounds, identified by HPLC, including gallic acid and ellagic acid. Rutin and isoquercetin are the primary flavonols found in clingstone peaches. The levels of flavonols and cyanidins are highest in the skins, though polyphenols vary by cultivar and due to the growing conditions in a growing season. Red-fleshed peaches are rich in anthocyanins, especially red fleshed varieties and their skins. Malvin is present in clingstone peaches.

As with many other members of the rose family, peach seeds contain cyanogenic glycosides, primarily amygdalin. Amygdalin decomposes into a sugar molecule, hydrogen cyanide gas, and benzaldehyde. Hydrogen cyanide poisons the action of a critical enzyme for the use of oxygen in cells, resulting in death in severe cases. While peach seeds are not the most toxic within the rose family (see bitter almond), large consumption of these chemicals from any source is potentially hazardous to animal and human health. These chemicals make the seed taste like an almond, and peach stones are used to make a cheap version of marzipan, known as persipan.

The attractive aroma of a ripe peach is the product of 110 different volatile molecules, including alcohols, ketones, aldehydes, esters, polyphenols, and terpenoids. The proportions vary significantly between different cultivars.

=== Potential allergen ===
Peach allergy or intolerance is a relatively common form of hypersensitivity to proteins in peaches and related fruits. Symptoms range from local effects (e.g., oral allergy syndrome, contact urticaria) to more severe systemic reactions, including anaphylaxis (e.g. urticaria, angioedema, gastrointestinal and respiratory symptoms). Adverse reactions are related to the "freshness" of the fruit: peeled or canned fruit may be tolerated.

== In culture ==
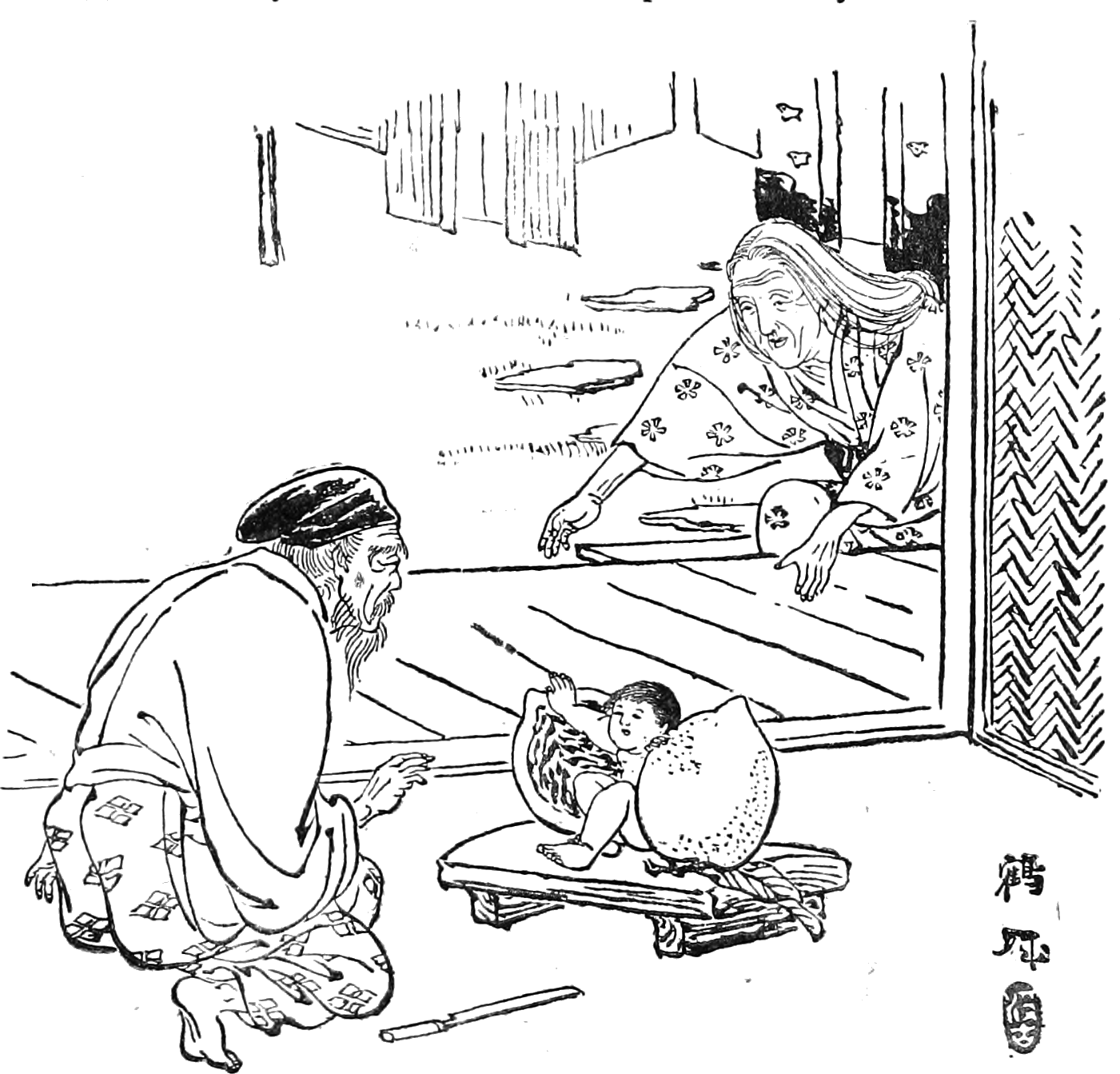
The Japanese folktale character Momotarō emerges from a peach.

Peaches are symbolic in cultural traditions such as in art, paintings, and folk tales. Peach blossoms are highly prized in Chinese culture. The ancient Chinese believed the peach to possess more vitality than any other tree because their blossoms appear before leaves sprout. When early rulers of China visited their territories, they were preceded by sorcerers armed with peach rods to protect them from spectral evils. On New Year's Eve, local magistrates would cut peach wood branches and place them over their doors to protect against evil influences. Peach wood was used for door gods during the Han. Similarly, peach trees were planted near the front door of a house to bring good fortune. The deity Shòu Xīng (Chinese: 寿星), a god of longevity, is usually depicted with a peach in his right hand due its associations with a long life.

As recorded by the traveller Isabella Bird in 1898, wands of peach wood are used in Korean shamanism. Originating from Daoism, the peach is a symbol of longevity in Korean art. Dream Journey to the Peach Blossom Land is the only existing signed and dated artwork by An Kyŏn. It depicts the imagined utopian Peach Blossom Land from a fable by the Chinese poet Tao Yuanming.

In Japan, Momotarō, ("peach child") is a folktale character named after the giant peach from which he was birthed. Two traditional Japanese words for the color pink correspond to blossoming trees: one for peach blossoms (momo-iro), and one for cherry blossoms (sakura-iro).

Roald Dahl decided on using a peach in his children's fantasy novel James and the Giant Peach after considering many other fruits including an apple, pear, or cherry. He thought the flavor and flesh of the peach to be more exciting.

Many famous artists have painted with peach fruits placed in prominence. Caravaggio, Vicenzo Campi, Pierre-Auguste Renoir, Claude Monet, Édouard Manet, Henri Fantin-Latour, Severin Roesen, Peter Paul Rubens, and Van Gogh are among the many influential artists who painted peaches and peach trees in various settings. Scholars suggest that many compositions are symbolic, some an effort to introduce realism. For example, Tresidder claims the artists of Renaissance symbolically used peach to represent heart, and a leaf attached to the fruit as the symbol for tongue, thereby implying speaking truth from one's heart; a ripe peach was also a symbol to imply a ripe state of good health. Caravaggio's paintings introduce realism by painting peach leaves that are molted, discolored, or in some cases have wormholes – conditions common in modern peach cultivation.

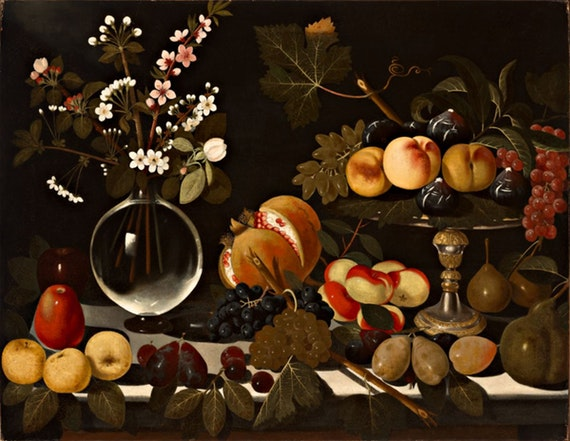
Still life with figs, peaches and grapes by Caravaggio, c. 1600-02

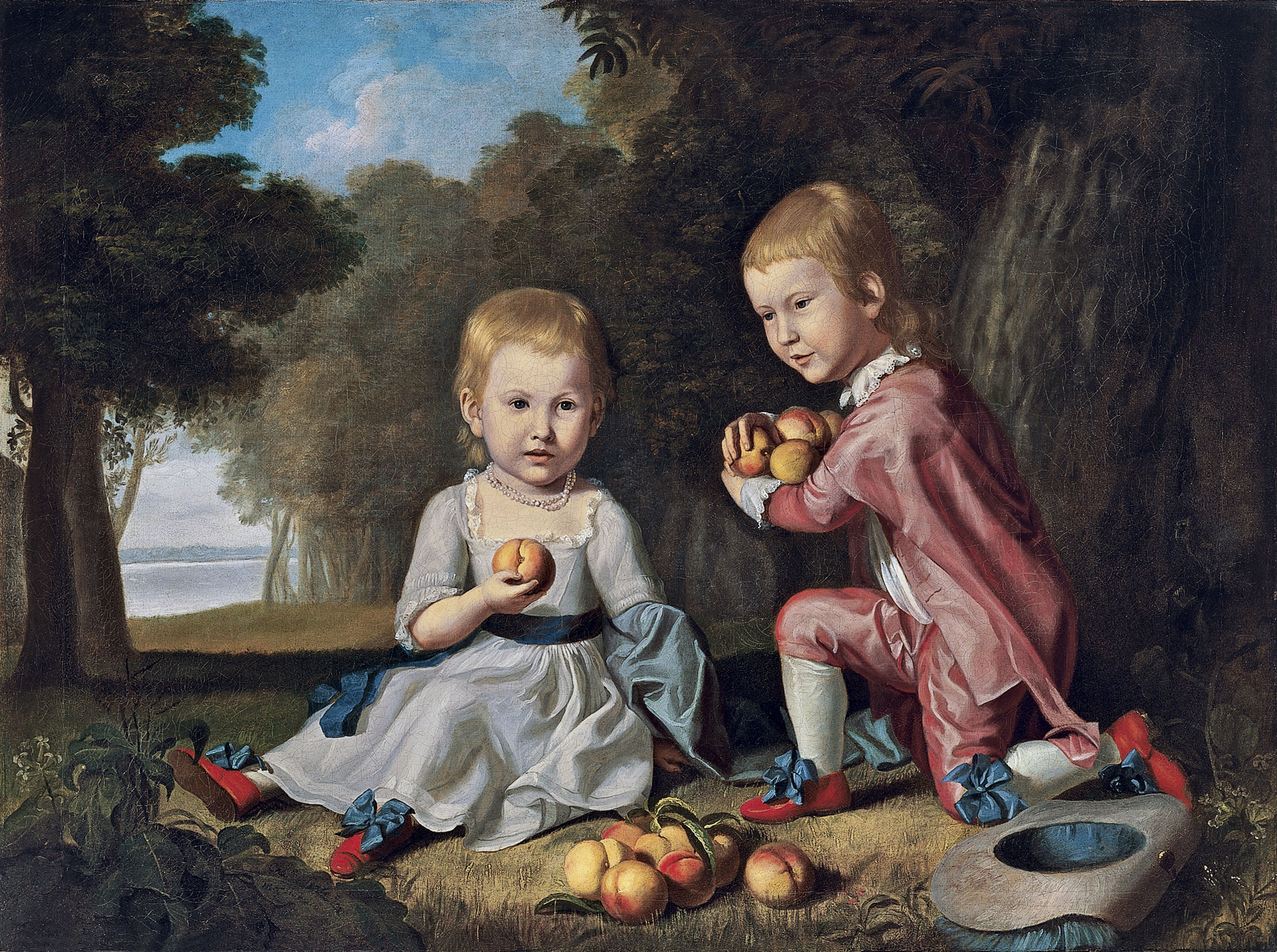
Portrait of Isabella and John Stewart by Charles Willson Peale, 1774

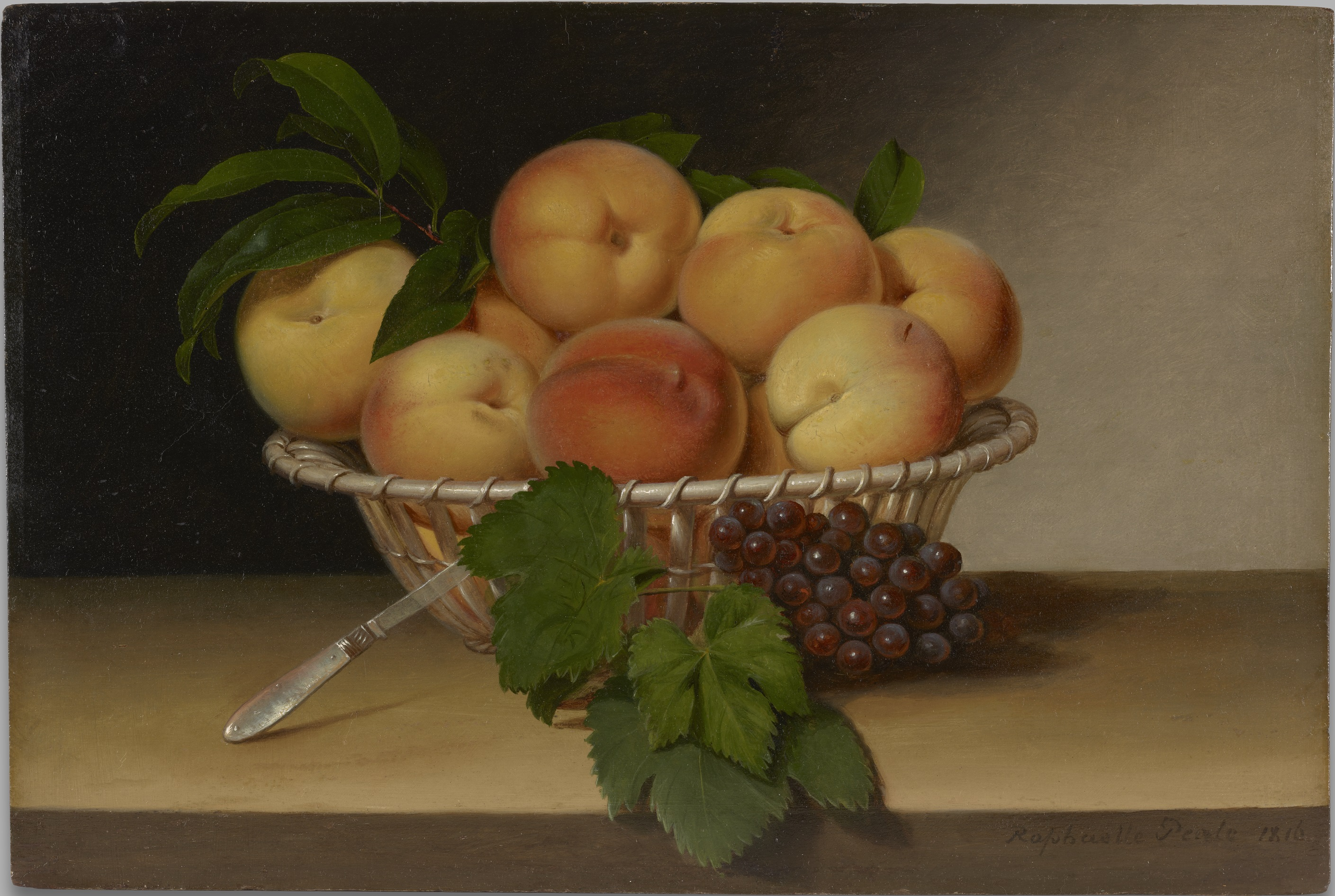
Still Life Basket of Peaches by Raphaelle Peale, 1816

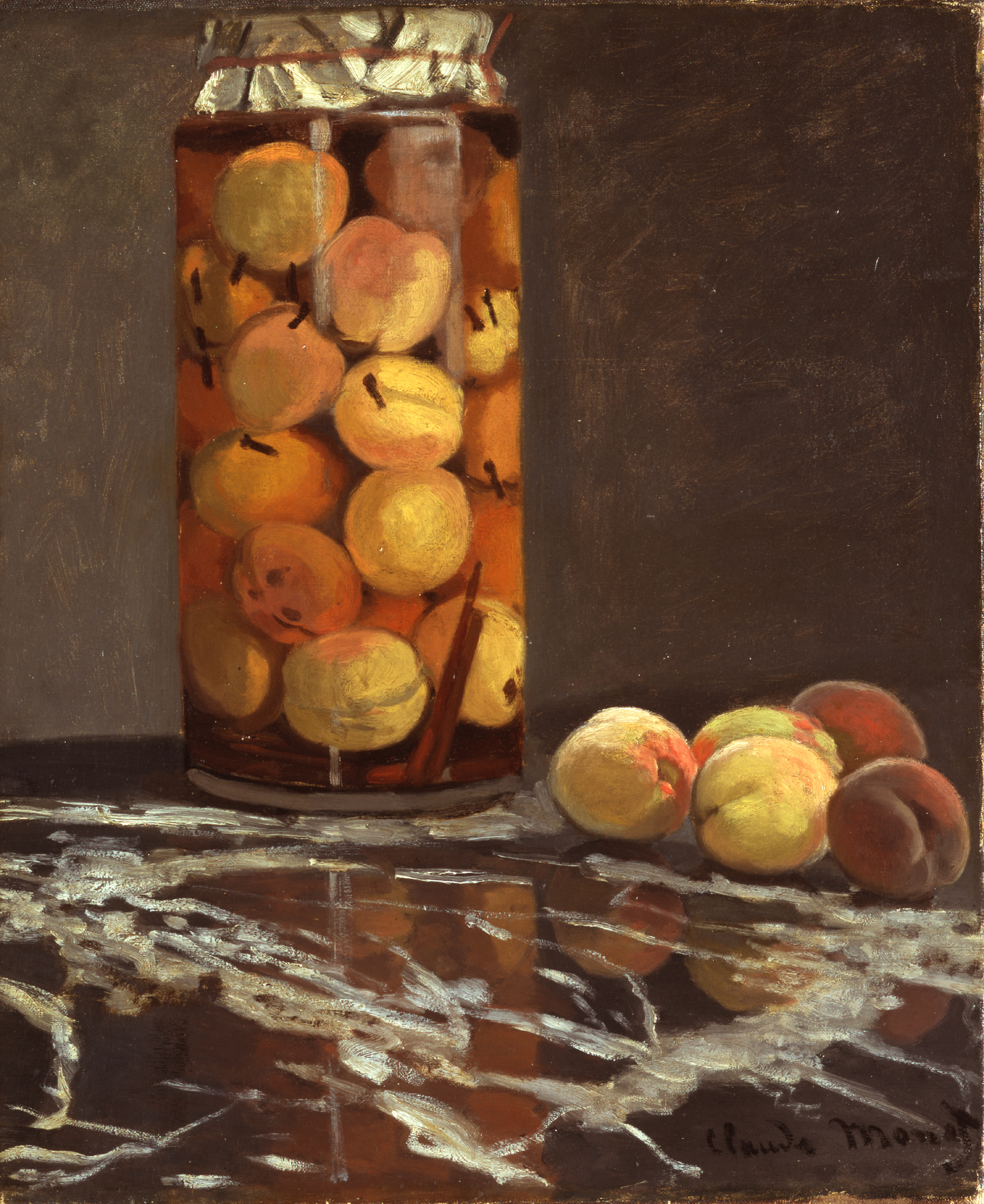
A Jar of Peaches by Claude Monet c. 1866

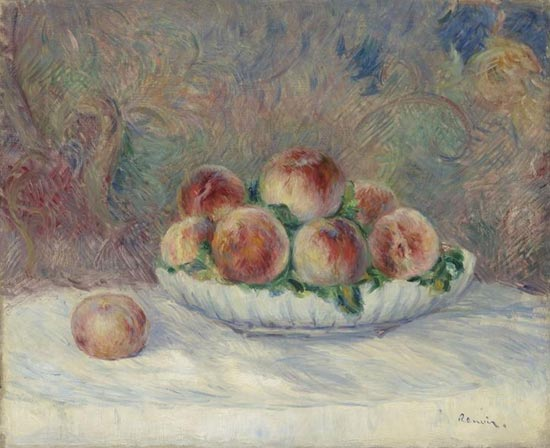
A Still Life Painting of Peaches by Pierre-Auguste Renoir, 1881–82

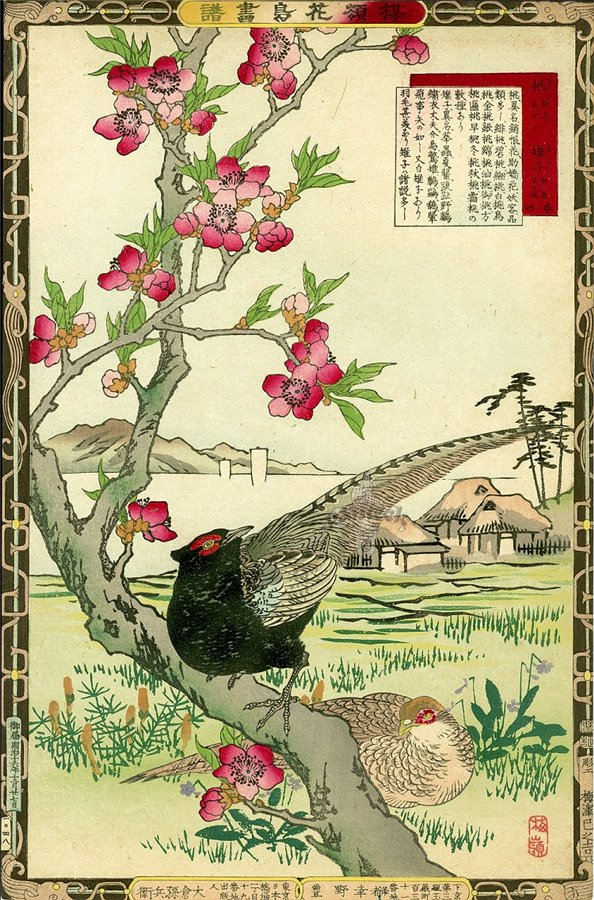
"Spring 4, peach-blossoms and green pheasants" by Kōno Bairei, 1883

== Sources ==
=== Books ===
- Barnhart, Robert K., ed. (1995) [1988]. The Barnhart Concise Dictionary of Etymology (First Revised ed.). New York: HarperCollins Publishers. ISBN 978-0-06-270084-1. OCLC 30399281.
- Bird, Isabella Lucy (1898). Korea & Her Neighbours: A Narrative of Travel, With Account of the Recent Vicissitudes and Present Position of the Country. Vol. Two (First ed.). London: John Murray. OCLC 1021046487.
- Blackburne-Maze, Peter (2003). Fruit: An Illustrated History (First ed.). London: Firefly Books. ISBN 978-1-55297-780-4. OCLC 51736017.
- Bassi, Daniele; Monet, R. (2008). "1. Botany and Taxonomy". In Layne, Desmond R.; Bassi, Daniele (eds.). The Peach: Botany, Production and Uses. Wallingford, United Kingdom: CABI. ISBN 978-1-84593-386-9. OCLC 290429712.
- Byrne, David H.; Raseira, Maria Bassols; Bassi, Daniele; Piagnani, Maria Claudia; Gasic, Ksenija; Reighard, Gregory L.; Moreno, María Angeles; Pérez, Salvador (2009). "Chapter 14: Peach". In Badenes, Maria Luisa; Byrne, David H. (eds.). Fruit Breeding (First ed.). New York: Springer. pp. 505–569. doi:10.1007/978-1-4419-0763-9_14. ISBN 978-1-4419-0762-2. LCCN 2011943557. OCLC 401157579.
- Campbell, Lyle (2004). Historical Linguistics: An Introduction (Second ed.). Cambridge, Massachusetts: MIT Press. ISBN 978-0-262-53267-9. OCLC 54692867.
- Davidson, Alan (1999). The Oxford Companion to Food (First ed.). Oxford, United Kingdom: Oxford University Press. ISBN 978-0-19-211579-9. OCLC 55747419.
- Davis, Brian (1997). The Gardener's Essential Plant Guide: Over 4,000 Varieties of Garden Plants Including Trees, Shrubs, and Vines (First ed.). San Diego, California: Laurel Glen Publishing. ISBN 978-1-57145-601-4. OCLC 37513042.
- Doré, Henri; Kennelly, M. (1914). Researches into Chinese Superstitions. Vol. V. Translated by Kennelly, M. (English ed.). Shanghai, China: Tʻusewei Printing Press. OCLC 1742009.
- Durkin, Philip (2009). The Oxford Guide to Etymology (First ed.). Oxford; New York: Oxford University Press. ISBN 978-0-19-923651-0. OCLC 301948893.
- Edwards, Linda (1998). Organic Tree Fruit Management. Keremeos, British Columbia: Certified Organic Associations of British Columbia. ISBN 978-0-7726-3615-7. OCLC 45818011.
- Ensminger, Audrey H.; Ensminger, M.E.; Konlande, James E.; Robson, John R.K. (1994). Foods & Nutrition Encyclopedia. Vol. 2. I–Z (Second ed.). Boca Raton, Florida: CRC Press. ISBN 978-0-8493-8980-1. OCLC 28963802.
- Fairchild, David; Kay, Elizabeth; Kay, Alfred (1938). The World Was My Garden: Travels of a Plant Explorer (First ed.). New York: Charles Scribner's Sons.
- Faust, Miklos; Timon, Béla (1995). "Chapter 10. Origin and Dissemination of Peach". In Janick, Jules (ed.). Horticultural Reviews. Vol. 17 (First ed.). New York: John Wiley & Sons. pp. 331–379. doi:10.1002/9780470650585.ch10. ISBN 978-0-471-57335-7. OCLC 827631597.
- Fogle, H.W. (1965). Peach Production East of the Rocky Mountains (PDF) (First ed.). Washington, D.C.: Agricultural Research Service, U.S. Department of Agriculture. OCLC 755264053. Archived (PDF) from the original on 27 December 2024.
- Fuller, Dorian Q.; Madella, Marco (2001). "Issues in Harappan Archaeobotany: Retrospect and Prospect". In Settar, S.; Korisettar, Ravi (eds.). Indian Archaeology in Retrospect. Vol. II. New Delhi, India: Indian Council of Historical Research : Manohar Publishers & Distributors. ISBN 978-81-7304-320-8. OCLC 50080611 – via ResearchGate.
- Heil, Kenneth D.; O'Kane, Steve L. Jr.; Reeves, Linda Mary; Clifford, Arnold (2013). Flora of the Four Corners Region: Vascular Plants of the San Juan River Drainage, Arizona, Colorado, New Mexico, and Utah (First ed.). St. Louis, Missouri: Missouri Botanical Garden. ISBN 978-1-930723-84-9. ISSN 0161-1542. LCCN 2012949654. OCLC 859541992.
- Hedrick, Ulysses Prentiss; Howe, George Henry; Taylor, Orrin Morehouse; Tubergen, Charles Burton (1917). The Peaches of New York. Albany, New York: State of New York, Department of Agriculture. OCLC 2082497.
- Ibn al-'Awwam, Yaḥyá ibn Muḥammad (1864). Le livre de l'agriculture d'Ibn-al-Awam (kitab-al-felahah) [Ibn-al-Awam's Book of Agriculture] (in French). Translated by Clément-Mullet, Jean Jacques. Paris: A. Franck. OCLC 780050566.
- Kingsbury, John M. (1972). Deadly Harvest: A Guide to Common Poisonous Plants (Paperback ed.). New York: Holt, Reinehart and Winston. ISBN 978-0-03-091479-9. OCLC 3508574.
- Krüssmann, Gerd (1986) [1978]. Daniels, Gilbert S. (ed.). Manual of Cultivated Broad-leaved Trees & Shrubs. Vol. III, Pru–Z. Translated by Epp, Michael E. (English ed.). London: B. T. Batsford. ISBN 0-7134-5408-3. OCLC 12600067.
- Leeming, David Adams (2001). A dictionary of Asian mythology. New York: Oxford University Press. ISBN 978-0-19-512052-3. OCLC 44750822.
- Li, Hui-lin (李惠林) (1983). "The Domestication of Plants in China: Ecogeographical Considerations". In Keightley, David N. (ed.). The Origins of Chinese Civilization. Berkeley, California: University of California Press. pp. 21–63. ISBN 978-0-520-04229-2. OCLC 7306992.
- Ingels, Chuck A.; Geisel, Pamela M.; Maxwell, Norton V.; Andris, Harry L.; Flint, Mary Louise; Johnson, T. Scott; Laivo, Edward D.; Prichard, Terry L.; Schwankl, Lawrence J.; Teviotdale, Beth L.; Vossen, Paul M. (2007). Ingels, Chuck A.; Geisel, Pamela M.; Maxwell, Norton V. (eds.). The Home Orchard: Growing Your Own Deciduous Fruit and Nut Trees (First ed.). Oakland, California: University of California, Agriculture and Natural Resources. ISBN 978-1-879906-72-3. OCLC 99996018.
- Sadori, Laura; Allevato, Emilia; Bosi, Giovanna; Caneva, Giulia; Castiglioni, Elisabetta; Celant, Alessandra; Di Pasquale, Gaetano; Giardini, Marco; Mazzanti, Marta; Rinaldi, Rossella; Rottoli, Mauro; Susanna, Francesca (2009). "The introduction and diffusion of peach in ancient Italy" ( (PDF)). In Morel, Jean-Paul; Mercuri, Anna Maria (eds.). Plants and Culture: Seeds of the Cultural Heritage of Europe (in English and Italian). Bari, Italy: Edipuglia. ISBN 978-88-7228-574-9. OCLC 1158440816. Archived from the original on 14 January 2013.
- Singh, Akath; Patel, R.K.; Babu, K.D.; De, L.C. (2020). "5. Low Chilling Peaches". In Peter, K.V. (ed.). Underutilized and Underexploited Horticultural Crops. Vol. 2. Pitam Pura, New Delhi, India: New India Publishing Agency. ISBN 978-93-89571-66-0. OCLC 1013169774.
- Simoons, Frederick J. (1991). Food in China: A Cultural and Historical Inquiry. Boca Raton, Florida: CRC Press. ISBN 978-0-8493-8804-0. OCLC 20392910.
- Spike, John T. (2010). "Caravaggio and the Origins of Roman Still Life Painting". In De Groft, Aaron H. (ed.). Caravaggio – Still Life with Fruit on a Stone Ledge (PDF). Williamsburg, Virginia: Muscarelle Museum of Art, The College of William and Mary. ISBN 978-0-9705725-6-1. OCLC 700941565. Archived from the original (PDF) on 14 January 2013.
- Sturrock, Donald (2010). Storyteller (First ed.). London: HarperPress. ISBN 978-0-00-725477-4. OCLC 768248123.
- Swislocki, Mark (2009). Culinary Nostalgia. Stanford, California: Stanford University Press. ISBN 978-0-8047-6012-6. OCLC 609217045.
- Thacker, Christopher (1985) [1979]. The History of Gardens (Paperback ed.). Berkeley, California: University of California Press. ISBN 978-0-520-05629-9. OCLC 5133474.
- Thakur, Disha; Thakur, Kiran; Thakur, Manish; Thakur, Kishore (2024). "Peach". In Rajasekharan, P. E.; Ramanatha Rao, V. (eds.). Fruit and Nut Crops. Singapore: Springer. pp. 99–117. doi:10.1007/978-981-99-5348-6_3. eISSN 2524-8456. ISBN 978-981-99-5347-9. ISSN 2524-8448. OCLC 1429614942.
- Thomé, Otto Wilhelm; Migula, Walter (1905). Prof. Dr. Thomé's Flora von Deutschland, Österreich und der Schweiz, in Wort und Bild, für Schule und Haus; mit ... Tafeln ... von Walter Müller [Prof. Dr. Thomé's Flora of Germany, Austria and Switzerland, in words and pictures, for school and home; with ... Plates ... by Walter Müller] (in German). Vol. 3. Gera-Untermhaus, German Empire: F.E. Köhler. OCLC 77887721. Archived from the original on 10 March 2009. Alt URL
- Tresidder, Jack (2004). 1,001 Symbols: An Illustrated Guide to Imagery and Its Meaning. San Francisco: Chronicle Books. ISBN 978-0-8118-4282-2. OCLC 52152867.
- Valder, Peter (1999). Garden Plants of China (First ed.). Glebe, New South Wales: Florilegium. ISBN 978-1-876314-02-6. OCLC 222405710.
- Vaughan, John; Geissler, Catherine (2009) [1997]. The New Oxford Book of Food Plants (Revised ed.). Oxford, United Kingdom: Oxford University Press. ISBN 978-0-19-954946-7. OCLC 968502468.
- Vos, Ken (1997). Symbolism & Simplicity: Korean Art from the Collection of Won-Kyung Cho. Leiden, the Netherlands: Hotei Publishing. ISBN 978-90-74822-04-6. OCLC 38855981.
- Welsh, Stanley L.; Atwood, N. Duane; Goodrich, Sherel; Higgins, Larry C. (1987). "A Utah Flora". Great Basin Naturalist Memoirs. Great Basin Naturalist Memoirs, No. 9 (9) (First ed.). Provo, Utah: Brigham Young University. JSTOR 23377658. OCLC 9986953694.
- Yang-mo, Chŏng; Hwi-joon, Ahn; Sŏng-mi, Yi; Lena, Kim; Hongnam, Kim; Youngsook, Pak; Best, Jonathan W. (1998). Smith, Judith G. (ed.). Arts of Korea. New York: Metropolitan Museum of Art. ISBN 978-0-87099-850-8. OCLC 38831761.
- Zhang, Bin-Cheng (1994). Index of Economically Important Lepidoptera. Wallingford, Connecticut: CAB International. ISBN 978-0-85198-903-7. OCLC 30777644.
- Ziosi, V.; Bregoli, A. M.; Fiori, G.; Noferini, M.; Costa, G. (2007). "1-MCP effects on ethylene emission and fruit quality traits of peaches and nectarines". In Ramina, Angelo; Chang, Caren; Giovannoni, Jim; Klee, Harry; Perata, Pierdomenico; Woltering, Ernst (eds.). Advances in Plant Ethylene Research: Proceedings of the 7th International Symposium on the Plant Hormone Ethylene. Dordrecht, the Netherlands: Springer. pp. 167–174. doi:10.1007/978-1-4020-6014-4_38. ISBN 978-1-4020-6014-4. OCLC 191450918. S2CID 81245874.

=== Journals ===
- Andreotti, Carlo; Ravaglia, Daniela; Ragaini, Alessandro; Costa, Guglielmo (August 2008). "Phenolic compounds in peach (Prunus persica) cultivars at harvest and during fruit maturation". Annals of Applied Biology. 153 (1): 11–23. Bibcode:2008AnnAB.153...11A. doi:10.1111/j.1744-7348.2008.00234.x.
- Besler, Matthias; Cuesta Herranz, Javier; Fernández-Rivas, Montserrat (2000). "Allergen Data Collection: Peach (Prunus persica)" (PDF). Internet Symposium on Food Allergens. 2 (4): 185–201. Archived (PDF) from the original on 21 November 2024.
- Blan, Noah (November 2019). "Charlemagne's peaches: a case of early medieval European ecological adaptation". Early Medieval Europe. 27 (4): 521–545. doi:10.1111/emed.12374.
- Cai, Hongfang; Han, Shuai; Jiang, Li; Yu, Mingliang; Ma, Ruijuan; Yu, Zhifang (August 2019). "1-MCP treatment affects peach fruit aroma metabolism as revealed by transcriptomics and metabolite analyses". Food Research International. 122: 573–584. doi:10.1016/j.foodres.2019.01.026. PMID 31229116.
- Capparelli, Aylen; Lema, Verónica; Giovannetti, Marco; Raffino, Rodolfo (December 2005). "The introduction of Old World crops (wheat, barley and peach) in Andean Argentina during the 16th century A.D.: archaeobotanical and ethnohistorical evidence". Vegetation History and Archaeobotany. 14 (4): 472–484. Bibcode:2005VegHA..14..472C. doi:10.1007/s00334-005-0093-8. ISSN 0939-6314. JSTOR 23419302. S2CID 129925523.
- Cevallos-Casals, Bolívar A.; Byrne, David; Okie, William R.; Cisneros-Zevallos, Luis (May 2006). "Selecting new peach and plum genotypes rich in phenolic compounds and enhanced functional properties". Food Chemistry. 96 (2): 273–280. Bibcode:2006FoodC..96..273C. doi:10.1016/j.foodchem.2005.02.032.
- Chang, Susan; Tan, Christine; Frankel, Edwin N.; Barrett, Diane M. (1 February 2000). "Low-density lipoprotein antioxidant activity of phenolic compounds and polyphenol oxidase activity in selected clingstone peach cultivars" (PDF). Journal of Agricultural and Food Chemistry. 48 (2): 147–151. Bibcode:2000JAFC...48..147C. doi:10.1021/jf9904564. PMID 10691607. Archived (PDF) from the original on 14 April 2024.
- Chen, Chunxian; Okie, William R.; Beckman, Thomas G. (July 2016). "Peach Fruit Set and Buttoning after Spring Frost". HortScience. 51 (7): 816–821. doi:10.21273/HORTSCI.51.7.816. ISSN 0018-5345.
- Cheng, Guiwen W.; Crisosto, Carlos H. (September 1995). "Browning Potential, Phenolic Composition, and Polyphenoloxidase Activity of Buffer Extracts of Peach and Nectarine Skin Tissue". Journal of the American Society for Horticultural Science. 120 (5): 835–838. Bibcode:1995JASHS.120..835C. doi:10.21273/JASHS.120.5.835.
- Cho, Hye-Jeon; Do, Byung-Kyung; Shim, Soon-Mi; Kwon, Hoonjeong; Lee, Dong-Ha; Nah, Ahn-Hee; Choi, Youn-Ju; Lee (30 June 2013). "Determination of Cyanogenic Compounds in Edible Plants by Ion Chromatography". Toxicological Research. 29 (2): 143–147. Bibcode:2013ToxRe..29..143C. doi:10.5487/TR.2013.29.2.143. ISSN 1976-8257. PMC 3834451. PMID 24278641.
- Crider, Franklin J. (26 October 1928). "Winter Root Growth of Plants". Science. 68 (1765): 403–404. doi:10.1126/science.68.1765.403.b. PMID 17790933.
- Cuesta-Herranz, J.; Lázaro, M.; de las Heras, M.; Lluch, M.; Figueredo, E.; Umpierrez, A.; Hernandez, J.; Cuesta, C. (January 1998). "Peach allergy pattern: experience in 70 patients". Allergy. 53 (1): 78–82. doi:10.1111/j.1398-9995.1998.tb03777.x. ISSN 0105-4538. PMID 9491233.
- European Food Safety Authority (2015). "The 2013 European Union report on pesticide residues in food". EFSA Journal. 13 (3) 4038. doi:10.2903/j.efsa.2015.4038. PMC 11883121. PMID 40061627.
- Fair, John D. (Fall 2002). "The Georgia Peach and the Southern Quest for Commercial Equity and Independence, 1843-1861". The Georgia Historical Quarterly. 86 (3): 372–397. ISSN 0016-8297. JSTOR 40584569.
- Lee, Suk-Hee; Oh, Angela; Shin, Seo-Hee; Kim, Ha-Na; Kang, Woo-Won; Chung, Shin-Kyo (30 September 2017). "Amygdalin contents in peaches at different fruit development stages". Preventive Nutrition and Food Science. 22 (3): 237–240. doi:10.3746/pnf.2017.22.3.237. ISSN 2287-1098. PMC 5642807. PMID 29043223.
- Gil, María I.; Tomás-Barberán, Francisco A.; Hess-Pierce, Betty; Kader, Adel A. (1 August 2002). "Antioxidant capacities, phenolic compounds, carotenoids, and vitamin C contents of nectarine, peach, and plum cultivars from California" (PDF). Journal of Agricultural and Food Chemistry. 50 (17): 4976–4982. Bibcode:2002JAFC...50.4976G. doi:10.1021/jf020136b. PMID 12166993. Archived (PDF) from the original on 5 July 2024.
- Gilman, Edward F.; Watson, Dennis G. (October 1994). Fact Sheet ST-513 – Prunus persica Peach (PDF) (Report). Environmental Horticulture Department, Florida Cooperative Extension Service, Institute of Food and Agricultural Sciences, University of Florida. Archived (PDF) from the original on 5 June 2010.
- Haase, Ilka; Brüning, Philipp; Matissek, Reinhard; Fischer, Markus (10 April 2013). "Real-Time PCR Assays for the Quantitation of rDNA from Apricot and Other Plant Species in Marzipan". Journal of Agricultural and Food Chemistry. 61 (14): 3414–3418. Bibcode:2013JAFC...61.3414H. doi:10.1021/jf3052175. ISSN 1520-5118. PMID 23495652.
- Holland-Lulewicz, Jacob; Thompson, Victor; Thompson, Amanda Roberts; Butler, RaeLynn; Chavez, Dario J.; Franklin, Jay; Hunt, Turner; Williams, Mark; Worth, John (20 September 2024). "The initial spread of peaches across eastern North America was structured by Indigenous communities and ecologies" (PDF). Nature Communications. 15 (1) 8245 (2024). Bibcode:2024NatCo..15.8245H. doi:10.1038/s41467-024-52597-8. ISSN 2041-1723. PMC 11415391. PMID 39304659. Archived (PDF) from the original on 25 September 2024.
- Infante, Rodrigo; Contador, Loreto; Rubio, Pía; Aros, Danilo; Peña-Neira, Álvaro (September 2011). "Postharvest Sensory and Phenolic Characterization of 'Elegant Lady' and 'Carson' Peaches" (PDF). Chilean Journal of Agricultural Research. 71 (3): 445–451. doi:10.4067/S0718-58392011000300016. ISSN 0718-5839. Archived (PDF) from the original on 11 July 2012.
- Jett, Stephen C. (1977). "History of Fruit Tree Raising among the Navajo". Agricultural History. 51 (4): 681–701. ISSN 0002-1482. JSTOR 3741756.
- Johannsmeier, M.F. (2016). Steenkamp, Yolande (ed.). Beeplants of South Africa: Sources of Nectar, Pollen, Honeydew and Propolis for Honeybees. Strelitzia, 37 (First ed.). Pretoria, South Africa: South African National Biodiversity Institute. ISBN 978-1-928224-17-4. OCLC 967504353.
- Kadasa, Naif M.; Metwali, Ehab M. R.; Soliman, Hemaid I. A.; Alshehri, Wafa A. (March 2022). "Creation of borer pests resistance genetically engineering peach (Prunus persica L.) plants by constitutively overexpressing the cry1Ab gene". Plant Cell, Tissue and Organ Culture. 148 (3): 465–477. Bibcode:2022PCTOC.148..465K. doi:10.1007/s11240-021-02198-w.
- Ramzan, Muhammad; Pang, Tianyuan; Shi, Longfei; Naeem-Ullah, Unsar; Saeed, Shafqat; Zhang, Tiantao; Panhwar, Waheed Ali; Zhang, Yongjun (9 July 2024). "Bio-ecology and management approaches of yellow peach moth, Conogethes punctiferalis (Lepidoptera: Crambidae)" (PDF). European Journal of Entomology. 121: 234–251. doi:10.14411/eje.2024.025. eISSN 1802-8829. Archived (PDF) from the original on 13 January 2025.
- McVaugh, Rogers (10 December 1951). "A Revision of the North American Black Cherries (Prunus Serotina Ehrh., and Relatives)". Brittonia. 7 (4): 279–315. Bibcode:1951Britt...7..279M. doi:10.2307/2804698. JSTOR 2804698.
- Shi, Shuo; Li, Jinlu; Sun, Jiahui; Yu, Jing; Zhou, Shiliang (November 2013). "Phylogeny and classification of Prunus sensu lato (Rosaceae)". Journal of Integrative Plant Biology. 55 (11): 1069–1079. Bibcode:2013JIPB...55.1069S. doi:10.1111/jipb.12095. ISSN 1744-7909. PMID 23945216 – via ResearchGate.
- Sánchez, Gerardo; Besada, Cristina; Badenes, María Luisa; Monforte, Antonio José; Granell, Antonio (22 June 2012). Bennett, Malcolm (ed.). "A Non-Targeted Approach Unravels the Volatile Network in Peach Fruit". PLOS ONE. 7 (6) e38992. Bibcode:2012PLoSO...738992S. doi:10.1371/journal.pone.0038992. hdl:10261/58898. PMC 3382205. PMID 22761719.
- Spence, Charles (16 May 2022). "Prunus persica in science, literature and art". Nature Food. 3 (5): 383–384. doi:10.1038/s43016-022-00517-8. PMID 37117568.
- Su, Tao; Wilf, Peter; Huang, Yongjiang; Zhang, Shitao; Zhou, Zhekun (26 November 2015). "Peaches Preceded Humans: Fossil Evidence from SW China". Scientific Reports. 5 16794 (2015). Bibcode:2015NatSR...516794S. doi:10.1038/srep16794. PMC 4660870. PMID 26610240.
- Szalay, Laszlo; Papp, J.; Szabó, Zoltán (October 2000). "Evaluation of Frost Tolerance of Peach Varieties in Artificial Freezing Tests". Acta Horticulturae (538): 407–410. doi:10.17660/ActaHortic.2000.538.71.
- Torpy, Janet M. (20 January 2010). "Still Life With Peaches". JAMA. 303 (3): 203. doi:10.1001/jama.2009.1853. PMID 20085943.
- Trainotti, Livio; Tadiello, Alice; Casadoro, Giorgio (September 2007). "The involvement of auxin in the ripening of climacteric fruits comes of age: the hormone plays a role of its own and has an intense interplay with ethylene in ripening peaches". Journal of Experimental Botany. 58 (12): 3299–3308. doi:10.1093/jxb/erm178. hdl:11577/2471631. PMID 17925301.
- Vendramin, Elisa; Pea, Giorgio; Dondini, Luca; Pacheco, Igor; Dettori, Maria Teresa; Gazza, Laura; Scalabrin, Simone; Strozzi, Francesco; Tartarini, Stefano; Bassi, Daniele; Verde, Ignazio; Rossini, Laura (3 March 2014). Peace, Cameron (ed.). "A Unique Mutation in a MYB Gene Cosegregates with the Nectarine Phenotype in Peach". PLOS ONE. 9 (3) e90574. Bibcode:2014PLoSO...990574V. doi:10.1371/journal.pone.0090574. ISSN 1932-6203. PMC 3940905. PMID 24595269.
- Verde, Ignazio; Abbott, Albert G; Scalabrin, Simone; Jung, Sook; Shu, Shengqiang; Marroni, Fabio; Zhebentyayeva, Tatyana; Dettori, Maria Teresa; Grimwood, Jane; Cattonaro, Federica; Zuccolo, Andrea; Rossini, Laura; et al. (May 2013). "The high-quality draft genome of peach (Prunus persica) identifies unique patterns of genetic diversity, domestication and genome evolution". Nature Genetics. 45 (5): 487–494. doi:10.1038/ng.2586. hdl:2434/218547. PMID 23525075.
- Yu, Yang; Fu, Jun; Xu, Yaoguang; Zhang, Jiewei; Ren, Fei; Zhao, Hongwei; Tian, Shilin; Guo, Wei; Tu, Xiaolong; Zhao, Jing; Jiang, Dawei; Zhao, Jianbo; Wu, Weiying; Wang, Gaochao; Ma, Rongcai; Jiang, Quan; Wei, Jianhua; Xie, Hua (20 December 2018). "Genome re-sequencing reveals the evolutionary history of peach fruit edibility". Nature Communications. 9 (1) 5404 (2018). Bibcode:2018NatCo...9.5404Y. doi:10.1038/s41467-018-07744-3. PMC 6302090. PMID 30573726.
- Zheng, Yunfei; Crawford, Gary W.; Chen, Xugao (5 September 2014). "Archaeological Evidence for Peach (Prunus persica) Cultivation and Domestication in China". PLOS ONE. 9 (9) e106595. Bibcode:2014PLoSO...9j6595Z. doi:10.1371/journal.pone.0106595. ISSN 1932-6203. PMC 4156326. PMID 25192436.

=== News ===
- Clark, John (March 2013). "Fresh & Local". FMCG. Vol. 19, no. 2. pp. 20–21. ISSN 1175-8279 – via EBSCOhost. "Sill available will be the later varieties mainly from the South Island – Omega and Songold plums; Fantasia and Summer Blush nectarines; Genevive and Southern Cross apricots; Peacherines;..."
- Shimabukuro, Betty (7 July 2004). "Mixed marriages: Cross-pollination produces fruit "children" that aren't quite the same as mom and dad". Honolulu Star-Bulletin. Archived from the original on 2 March 2012.

=== Web ===
- Adaskaveg, J.E.; Duncan, R.A.; Day, K.R. (2015). "UC Pest Management Guidelines for Peach Leaf Curl on Nectarine". Statewide Integrated Pest Management Program. UC Davis. Archived from the original on 19 January 2016.
- Atkinson, Fiona S.; Foster-Powell, Kaye; Brand-Miller, Jennie C. (27 August 2015). "Glycemic index and glycemic load for 100+ foods". Harvard Health Publications. Harvard University School of Medicine. Archived from the original on 25 April 2017.
- Dolan, Susan; Wytsalucy, Reagan; Lyons, Keith (4 April 2024) [22 June 2022]. "How a Navajo Scientist Is Helping to Restore Traditional Peach Horticulture". National Park Service. Archived from the original on 5 January 2025.
- FAOSTAT (2024). "Production of peaches and nectarines in 2023; Crops/Regions/World/Production Quantity (from pick lists)". Food and Agriculture Organization of the United Nations (FAO). United Nations, Food and Agricultural Organization, Statistics Division (FAOSTAT).
- Gao, Gary (2000). "Peach and Nectarine Culture". Green Share Factsheets. University of Rhode Island. Archived from the original on 14 January 2013.
- Given, David Roger; Webb, Colin James; Sykes, William Russell; Macmillan, Bryony Hope (2024) [1988]. "Prunus persica (L.) Batsch". Flora of New Zealand Series. Lincoln, New Zealand: Manaaki Whenua – Landcare Research. ISBN 978-0-477-02529-4. OCLC 7925748. Archived from the original on 21 December 2024.
- Gorsuch, Clyde S.; Scott, Janet McLeod (7 June 2021). Blaauw, Brett; Schnabel, Guido; Williamson, Joey (eds.). "HGIC 2210 - Peach Insect Pests". Clemson Cooperative Extension - Home & Garden Information Center. Clemson University. Archived from the original on 7 October 2024.
- Harden, G.J.; Rodd, A.N. (n.d.). "Prunus persica (L.) Batsch". PlantNET - New South Wales Flora Online. Sydney, Australia: National Herbarium of NSW, Royal Botanic Garden. Archived from the original on 15 December 2024.
- Hasey, Janine (November 2009). "Fruit and Nut Varieties for Low-Elevation Sierra Foothills" (PDF). University of California, Division of Agriculture and Natural Resources. Archived from the original (PDF) on 12 June 2010.
- Hassler, Michael (19 September 2024). "Synonymic Checklist and Distribution of the World Flora. Version 24.9". World Plants.
- Janick, Jules (n.d.). "Caravaggio's Fruit: A Mirror on Baroque Horticulture" (PDF). NewCROP (New Crops Resource Online Program). Purdue University. Archived from the original (PDF) on 14 January 2013.
- Kamas, Jim; Stein, Larry; Nesbitt, Monte (2015). "EHT-022 Texas Fruit and Nut Production: Peaches" (PDF). Agrilife Extension. Texas A&M. Archived (PDF) from the original on 14 April 2024.
- Lockwood, David W.; Coston, D.C. (2007). "Peach tree Physiology" (PDF). University of Georgia. Archived from the original (PDF) on 10 June 2010.
- Lingdi, Lu (Lu Ling-ti); Bartholomew, Bruce (2003). Wu, Z.Y.; Raven, P.H.; Hong, D.Y. (eds.). "Amygdalus persica". Flora of China @ efloras.org. Archived from the original on 12 February 2024.
- Carroll, Becky (February 2017). "Planting and Early Care of the Peach Orchard". OSU Extension. Oklahoma State University. Archived from the original on 8 November 2017.
- Moran, Renae (2014). "Bulletin #2068, Growing Peaches in Maine". Cooperative Extension Publications. University of Maine. Archived from the original on 26 August 2015.
- NPS Staff (2020). "The Clinton-Sullivan Campaign of 1779". Fort Stanwix National Monument. The Military History of Fort Schuyler. National Park Service. Archived from the original on 7 November 2023.
- NRCS (5 October 2024), "Prunus persica", PLANTS Database, United States Department of Agriculture (USDA)
- Okie, W.R. (2005). "Varieties – Peaches" (PDF). University of Georgia. Archived from the original (PDF) on 14 January 2013.
- Rohrer, Joseph R. (5 November 2020). "Prunus". Flora of North America. Archived from the original on 5 September 2024.
- Rohrer, Joseph R. (5 November 2020). "Prunus persica". Flora of North America. Archived from the original on 18 April 2024.
- Seelig, R.A.; Fogle, Harold W.; Hesse, Claron O. (22 May 2007) [1971]. "Frequently Asked Questions". Food Resource. Oregon State University. Archived from the original on 14 July 2008.
- Sumrak, Dennis (15 August 2017). "Navajos Will Never Forget the 1864 Scorched-Earth Campaign". History Net. Archived from the original on 24 June 2024.
- Taylor, Kathryn C. (26 September 2018) [15 August 2003]. "Peaches". New Georgia Encyclopedia. Georgia Humanities, University of Georgia Press. Archived from the original on 26 December 2024.
- "Healthy and Sustainable Food". The Center for Health and the Global Environment. Harvard Medical School. 2010. Archived from the original on 11 February 2012.
- "Nectarine, Adj. & N. (2)". Oxford English Dictionary (online ed.). Oxford University Press. doi:10.1093/OED/5327466125. (Subscription or participating institution membership required.)
- "Nectarine, N. (1)". Oxford English Dictionary (online ed.). Oxford University Press. doi:10.1093/OED/1154557334. (Subscription or participating institution membership required.)
- "Peach". Oxford English Dictionary (online ed.). Oxford University Press. doi:10.1093/OED/8560354383. (Subscription or participating institution membership required.)
- "Prunus persica (L.) Batsch". Plants of the World Online. Royal Botanic Gardens, Kew.
- "Prunus persica (Common Peach, Peach)". North Carolina Extension Gardener Plant Toolbox. North Carolina State University. Archived from the original on 13 June 2024.
- "Prunus persica (L.) Batsch". World Flora Online.
- "Prunus persica (Linnaeus) Batsch". Database of Canadian Vascular Plants (VASCAN).
