= List of Prunus species =

== Plants of the World Online list ==
The following species in the genus Prunus were recognised by Plants of the World Online as of March 2024:

=== POWO A-C ===
- P. africana (Hook.f.) Kalkman
- P. aitchisonii (Korsh.) Kitam.
- P. alaica (Pojark.) Gilli
- P. albicaulis Koehne ex Bornm.
- P. americana Marshall
- P. amplifolia Pilg.
- P. amygdalus Batsch
- P. andersonii A.Gray
- P. angustifolia Marshall
- P. annularis Koehne
- P. antioquensis Pérez-Zab.
- P. apetala (Siebold & Zucc.) Franch. & Sav.
- P. aquifolioides (Chun ex T.T.Yu & L.T.Lu) W.C.Chen
- P. arabica (Olivier) Meikle
- P. arborea (Blume) Kalkman
- P. argentea (Lam.) Rehder
- P. armeniaca L.
- P. austrosinensis Huan C.Wang
- P. avium (L.) L.
- P. axitliana Standl.
- P. balansae (Boiss.) Fritsch
- P. barbata Koehne
- P. beccarii (Ridl.) Kalkman
- P. bifrons Fritsch
- P. brachybotrya Zucc.
- P. brachypetala (Boiss.) Walp.
- P. brachypoda Batalin
- P. brachystachya Kalkman
- P. bracteopadus Koehne
- P. brahuica (Boiss.) Aitch. & Hemsl.
- P. brasiliensis (Cham. & Schltdl.) D.Dietr.
- P. brassii Kalkman
- P. brigantina Vill.
- P. brittoniana Rusby
- P. browiczii (Freitag) Eisenman
- P. brunnescens (T.T.Yu & T.C.Ku) J.R.He
- P. bucharica (Korsh.) Hand.-Mazz.
- P. buergeriana Miq.
- P. buxifolia Koehne
- P. campanulata Maxim.
- P. canescens Bois
- P. carduchorum (Bornm.) Meikle
- P. caroliniana (Mill.) Aiton
- P. cathayana (D.L.Fu, B.R.Li & J.Hong Li) Y.H.Tong & N.H.Xia
- P. caudata Franch.
- P. ceraseidos Maxim.
- P. cerasia Blanche ex Post
- P. cerasifera Ehrh.
- P. cerasoides Buch.-Ham. ex D.Don
- P. cerasus L.
- P. cercocarpifolia Villarreal
- P. ceylanica (Wight) Miq.
- P. chamissoana Koehne
- P. changyangensis (Ingram) Ingram
- P. chiapensis Standl. & L.O.Williams ex Ant.Molina
- P. chiliangensis S.S.Ying
- P. choreiana Nakai ex T.Kawamoto
- P. chorossanica (Pojark.) Rech.f.
- P. clarofolia C.K.Schneid.
- P. clementis (Merr.) Kalkman
- P. cocomilia Ten.
- P. compacta L.O.Williams
- P. conadenia Koehne
- P. conradinae Koehne
- P. consociiflora C.K.Schneid.
- P. cornuta (Wall. ex Royle) Steud.
- P. cortapico Kerber ex Koehne
- P. costata (Hemsl.) Kalkman
- P. crassifolia (Hauman) Kalkman
- P. crataegifolia Hand.-Mazz.
- P. cyclamina Koehne

=== POWO D-F ===
- P. darvasica Temb.
- P. davidiana (Carrière) Franch.
- P. dawyckensis Sealy
- P. debilis Koehne
- P. detrita J.F.Macbr.
- P. dictyoneura Diels
- P. dinabandhuana Mekrini & Biseshwori
- P. discadenia Koehne
- P. discoidea (T.T.Yu & C.L.Li) Z.Wei & Y.B.Chang
- P. discolor (Spach) C.K.Schneid.
- P. dolichadenia Cardot
- P. dolichobotrys (Lauterb. & K.Schum.) Kalkman
- P. dolichophylla (T.T.Yu & L.T.Lu) Y.H.Tong & N.H.Xia
- P. domestica L.
- P. douglasii Basualdo & Zardini
- P. eburnea (Spach) Aitch.
- P. elaeagrifolia (Spach) Fritsch (orth. var. P. elaeagnifolia)
- P. emarginata (Douglas ex Hook.) Eaton
- P. eremophila Prigge
- P. erythrocarpa (Nevski) Gilli
- P. erythroxylon Koehne
- P. falcata Cuatrec.
- P. fasciculata (Torr.) A.Gray
- P. fenzliana Fritsch
- P. ferruginea (DC. ex Ser.) Steud.
- P. fordiana Dunn
- P. fragrans (Elmer) Kalkman
- P. fremontii S.Watson
- P. fruticosa Pall.
- P. fujianensis (Y.T.Chang) J.Wen

=== POWO G-I ===
- P. gazelle-peninsulae (Kaneh. & Hatus.) Kalkman
- P. geniculata R.M.Harper
- P. gentryi Standl.
- P. georgica (Desf.) Eisenman
- P. ghahremanii (Maroofi, Attar & Vafadar) Falat.
- P. glabrifolia Kalkman
- P. glandulosa Thunb.
- P. glauca (Browicz) A.E.Murray
- P. gongshanensis J.Wen
- P. gracilis Engelm. & A.Gray
- P. grayana Maxim.
- P. griffithii (Boiss.) C.K.Schneid.
- P. grisea (Blume ex Müll.Berol.) Kalkman
- P. guanaiensis Rusby
- P. guatemalensis I.M.Johnst.
- P. gyirongensis Y.H.Tong & N.H.Xia
- P. hainanensis (G.A.Fu & Y.S.Lin) W.C.Chen
- P. harae H.Ohba & S.Akiyama
- P. hargraonensis (Vassilcz.) Ghora & Panigrahi
- P. haussknechtii C.K.Schneid.
- P. havardii (W.Wight) S.C.Mason
- P. hefengensis (X.R.Wang & C.B.Shang) Y.H.Tong & N.H.Xia
- P. henryi (C.K.Schneid.) Koehne
- P. herthae Diels
- P. himalaica Kitam.
- P. himalayana J.Wen
- P. hippophaeoides (Bornm.) Bornm.
- P. hirtipes Hemsl.
- P. hongiaoensis Tagane & Yahara
- P. hongpingensis (C.L.Li) Y.H.Tong & N.H.Xia
- P. hortulana L.H. Bailey
- P. huantensis Pilg.
- P. humilis Bunge
- P. hypoleuca (Koehne) J.Wen
- P. hypotricha Rehder
- P. hypotrichodes Cardot
- P. hypoxantha (Koehne) J.Wen
- P. ilicifolia (Nutt. ex Hook. & Arn.) D.Dietr.
- P. incana (Pall.) Batsch
- P. incisa Thunb.
- P. incisoserrata (T.T.Yu & T.C.Ku) J.Wen
- P. insititia L.
- P. integrifolia (C.Presl) Walp.
- P. itosakura Siebold

=== POWO J-L ===
- P. jacquemontii Hook.f.
- P. jajarkotensis H.Hara
- P. jamasakura (Makino) Siebold ex Koidz.
- P. japonica Thunb.
- P. javanica (Teijsm. & Binn.) Miq.
- P. jenkinsii Hook.f. & Thomson
- P. jugata (Browicz) A.E.Murray
- P. kaengkrachanensis Nagam., Tagane & Suddee
- P. kansuensis Rehder
- P. Kalkman
- P. koelzii (Browicz) A.E.Murray
- P. korshinskyi Hand.-Mazz.
- P. kotschyi (Boiss. & Hohen. ex Spach) Meikle
- P. kuramica (Korsh.) Kitam.
- P. kurdistanica (Attar, Maroofi & Vafadar) Eisenman
- P. lamponga (Miq.) Kalkman
- P. lancilimba (Merr.) Kalkman
- P. laurocerasus L.
- P. laxinervis Kalkman
- P. ledebouriana (Schltdl.) Y.Y.Yao
- P. leiocarpa (Boiss.) Fritsch]
- P. leucophylla Blatt.
- P. leveilleana Koehne
- P. ligustrina Koehne
- P. limeixing (J.Y.Zhang & Z.M.Wang) Y.H.Tong & N.H.Xia
- P. littlei Pérez-Zab.
- P. longispinosa PShahbaz & Abdulr.
- P. lundelliana Standl.
- P. lusitanica L.
- P. lycioides (Spach) C.K.Schneid.

=== POWO M-O ===
- P. maackii Rupr.
- P. mahaleb L.
- P. malayana Kalkman
- P. mandshurica (Maxim.) Koehne
- P. maritima Marshall
- P. marsupialis Kalkman
- P. matudae Lundell
- P. maximowiczii Rupr.
- P. mazandaranica Habibi, H.Maleki & Attar
- P. megacarpa Pérez-Zab.
- P. menghaiensis (T.T.Yu & L.T.Lu) Huan C.Wang
- P. mexicana S.Watson
- P. microcarpa C.A.Mey.
- P. microphylla (Kunth) Hemsl.
- P. minutiflora Engelm. ex A.Gray
- P. mira Koehne
- P. moldavica Kotov
- P. mongolica Maxim.
- P. moritziana Koehne
- P. mugus Hand.-Mazz.
- P. mume (Siebold) Siebold & Zucc.
- P. munsoniana W.Wight & Hedrick
- P. muris Cuatrec.
- P. murrayana E.J.Palmer
- P. myrtifolia (L.) Urb.
- P. nairica (Fed. & Takht.) Eisenman
- P. napaulensis (Ser.) Steud.
- P. nigra Aiton
- P. nipponica Matsum.
- P. nutantiflora D.G.Zhang & Z.H.Xiang
- P. oblonga J.F.Macbr.
- P. obtusata Koehne
- P. occidentalis Sw.
- P. ocellata Koehne
- P. ochoterenae D.Ramírez
- P. oleifolia Koehne
- P. oligantha Kalkman
- P. omissa Koehne
- P. oocarpa (Stapf) Kalkman
- P. opaca (Benth.) Walp.
- P. orazii (Attar, Maroofi & Vafadar) Eisenman
- P. ovalis Ruiz ex Koehne

=== POWO P-R ===
- P. pabotii (Browicz) Eisenman
- P. padus L.
- P. pananensis Z.L.Chen, W.J.Chen & X.F.Jin
- P. paradoxa (Dehshiri & Mozaff.) Falat.
- P. patentipila Hand.-Mazz.
- P. pearcei Rusby
- P. pedunculata (Pall.) Maxim.
- P. pensylvanica L.f.
- P. persica (L.) Batsch
- P. perulata Koehne
- P. petunnikowii (Litv.) Rehder
- P. phaeosticta (Hance) Maxim.
- P. pleiantha Pilg.
- P. pleiocerasus Koehne
- P. podperae Nábelek
- P. pogonostyla Maxim.
- P. polystachya (Hook.f.) Kalkman
- P. polytricha Koehne
- P. prostrata Labill.
- P. pseudocerasus Lindl.
- P. pseudoprostrata (Pojark.) Rech.f.
- P. pulgarensis (Elmer) Kalkman
- P. pullei (Koehne) Kalkman
- P. pumila L.
- P. pusilliflora Cardot
- P. pygeoides Koehne
- P. ramburii Boiss.
- P. ramonensis (Danin) Eisenman
- P. ravenii Zardini & Basualdo
- P. rechingeri (Browicz) A.E.Murray
- P. reflexa (Gardner) Walp.
- P. reverchonii Sarg.
- P. rhamnoides Koehne
- P. rigida Koehne
- P. rivularis Scheele
- P. rotunda J.F.Macbr.
- P. rubiginosa (Elmer) Kalkman
- P. rufa Wall. ex Hook.f.
- P. rufoides C.K.Schneid.
- P. ruiziana Koehne
- P. runemarkii Eisenman

=== POWO S-U ===
- P. salasii Standl.
- P. salicina Lindl.
- P. samydoides Schltdl.
- P. sargentii Rehder
- P. schlechteri (Koehne) Kalkman
- P. schneideriana Koehne
- P. sclerophylla Kalkman
- P. scoparia (Spach) C.K.Schneid.
- P. serotina Ehrh.
- P. serrula Franch.
- P. serrulata Lindl.
- P. setulosa Batalin
- P. shikokuensis (Moriya) H.Kubota
- P. sibirica L.
- P. simonii (Decne.) Carrière
- P. singalilaensis H.Ohba & S.Akiyama
- P. spartioides (Spach) C.K.Schneid.
- P. speciosa (Koidz.) Nakai
- P. spicata Kalkman
- P. spinosa L.
- P. spinosissima (Bunge) Franch.
- P. spinulosa Siebold & Zucc.
- P. ssiori F.Schmidt
- P. stellipila Koehne
- P. stipulacea Maxim.
- P. stipulata J.F.Macbr.
- P. strobilifera Cuatrec.
- P. subcordata Benth.
- P. subcoriacea (Chodat & Hassl.) Koehne
- P. subcorymbosa Ruiz ex Koehne
- P. subglabra (Merr.) Kalkman
- P. sunhangii D.G.Zhang & T.Deng
- P. susakensis (Vassilcz.) Eisenman
- P. susquehanae Willd.
- P. szechuanica Batalin
- P. tadzhikistanica Zaprjagaeva
- P. takesimensis Nakai
- P. tangutica (Batalin) Koehne
- P. taplejungnica H.Ohba & S.Akiyama
- P. tartarea Lundell
- P. tatsienensis Batalin
- P. tenella Batsch
- P. tetradenia Koehne
- P. texana D.Dietr.
- P. tomentosa Thunb.
- P. topkegolensis H.Ohba & S.Akiyama
- P. transarisanensis Hayata
- P. trichamygdalus Hand.-Mazz.
- P. trichantha Koehne
- P. trichostoma Koehne
- P. triloba Lindl.
- P. tuberculata Koehne
- P. tucumanensis Lillo
- P. turcomanica (Lincz.) Kitam.
- P. turfosa Kalkman
- P. turneriana (F.M.Bailey) Kalkman
- P. ulei Koehne
- P. ulmifolia Franch.
- P. umbellata Elliott
- P. undulata Buch.-Ham. ex D.Don
- P. urartu (Tamamsch.) Eisenman
- P. urotaenia Koehne
- P. urumiensis (Bornm.) A.E.Murray

=== POWO V-Z ===
- P. vachuschtii Bregadze
- P. veitchii Koehne
- P. velutina Batalin
- P. verrucosa Franch.
- P. versteeghii Kalkman
- P. virginiana L.
- P. walkeri (Wight) Kalkman
- P. wallaceana Kalkman
- P. wangii Q.L.Gan, Z.Y.Li & S.Z.Xu
- P. webbii (Spach) Fritsch
- P. wendelboi (Freitag) Eisenman
- P. wilsonii (C.K.Schneid.) Koehne
- P. xianjuxing (J.Y.Zhang & X.Z.Wu) Y.H.Tong & N.H.Xia
- P. xingshanensis Huan C.Wang
- P. yaoiana (W.L.Cheng) Y.H.Tong & N.H.Xia
- P. yazdiana (Mozaff.) Falat.
- P. yunkaishanensis B.H.Wu, W.Y.Zhao & W.B.Liao
- P. yunnanensis Franch.
- P. zabulica (Seraf.) Eisenman
- P. zhengheensis (J.Y.Zhang & M.N.Lu) Y.H.Tong & N.H.Xia
- P. zinggii Standl.
- P. zippeliana Miq.

=== POWO hybrids ===
- Prunus × chichibuensis H.Kubota & Moriya
- Prunus × compta (Koidz.) Tatew.
- Prunus × dasycarpa Ehrh.
- Prunus × eminens Beck
- Prunus × ferganica O.A.Lincz.
- Prunus × furuseana Ohwi
- Prunus × fruticans Weihe
- Prunus × gondouinii (Poit. & Turpin) Rehder
- Prunus × hisauchiana Koidz. ex Hisauti
- Prunus × insueta (S.Serafimov) S.Serafimov
- Prunus × iranshahrii (Khat.) Eisenman
- Prunus × javorkae Kárpáti
- Prunus × kamiaranensis (Khat. & Assadi) Eisenman
- Prunus × keredjensis (Browicz) A.E.Murray
- Prunus × kubotana Kawas.
- Prunus × lannesiana (Carrière) E.H.Wilson
- Prunus × mitsuminensis Moriya
- Prunus × miyasakana H.Kubota
- Prunus × mohacsyana Kárpáti
- Prunus × mozaffarianii (Khat.) Eisenman
- Prunus × nudiflora (Koehne) Koidz.
- Prunus × oneyamensis Hayashi
- Prunus × orthosepala Koehne
- Prunus × palmeri Sarg.
- Prunus × parvifolia (Matsum.) Koehne
- Prunus × sacra Miyoshi
- Prunus × saviczii (Pachom.) Eisenman
- Prunus × sefinensis (Bornm.) A.E.Murray
- Prunus × sieboldii (Carrière) Wittm.
- Prunus × simmleri Palez.
- Prunus × slavinii E.J.Palmer ex Rehder
- Prunus × stacei Wójcicki
- Prunus × subhirtella Miq.
- Prunus × syodoi Nakai
- Prunus × syriaca Borkh.
- Prunus × tschonoskii Koehne
- Prunus × uzbekistanica (Sabirov) Eisenman
- Prunus × vavilovii (Popov) A.E.Murray
- Prunus × yasujensis (Khat.) Eisenman
- Prunus × yedoensis Matsum.
- Prunus × yuyamae Sugim.

== The Plant List ==
The following additional species in the genus Prunus were recognised by The Plant List:

=== The Plant List species ===
- P. adenopoda → Prunus zippeliana Miq.
- P. alabamensis → Prunus serotina var. alabamensis (C.Mohr)
- P. alleghaniensis → Prunus umbellata Elliott
- P. mirabilis Kalkman, nom. illeg. → Prunus kalkmanii Idrees & J.M.H.Shaw

=== The Plant List hybrids ===
- Prunus × cistena
- Prunus × juddii
- Prunus × shikokuensis

== ITIS list ==
The following additional species are accepted by the Integrated Taxonomic Information System (ITIS), although they might be considered synonyms by other sources:

- Prunus pleuradenia
- Prunus × pugetensis Madrono, 2007
- Prunus × utahensis

== GRIN list ==
The following additional species are accepted by the Germplasm Resources Information Network (GRIN), although they might be considered synonyms by other sources, or be erroneous accessions:

=== GRIN species ===
- Prunus erioclada
- Prunus ferganica
- Prunus glandulifolia
- Prunus graeca
- Prunus meyeri
- Prunus pojarkovii
- Prunus takasagomontana
- Prunus ursina
- Prunus verecunda

=== GRIN hybrids ===
- Prunus × arnoldiana
- Prunus × balansae
- Prunus × blireiana
- Prunus × dawyckensis
- Prunus × fontanesiana
- Prunus × incam
- Prunus × kanzakura
- Prunus × knudsonii
- Prunus × persicoides
- Prunus × rossica
- Prunus × schmittii

== Tropicos list ==
The following additional species are listed by Tropicos; many are synonyms of the species above:

=== Tropicos A-C ===
- P. accumulans
- P. acuminata Hook.f. - synonym of P. maritima
- P. acutissima
- P. adenodonta
- P. ampla
- P. anomala
- P. ansu
- P. apodantha
- P. aridus
- P. arkansana
- P. aspera
- P. australis
- P. balfourii
- P. batalinii
- P. betancurii
- P. bicolor
- P. biloba
- P. bonatii
- P. botan
- P. brevistylina
- P. brigantiaca
- P. bruijnii
- P. canadensis
- P. capellin
- P. capollin
- P. capuli
- P. carcharias
- P. carolinae – synonym of P. subcorymbosa
- P. caspica
- P. cellonvii
- P. chamaecerasus
- P. chicasa
- P. chikusiensis
- P. cinerascens
- P. communis
- P. cornifolia
- P. corymbulosa
- P. crataegifolius
- P. crenulata
- P. cuneata
- P. cuthbertii

=== Tropicos D-F ===
- P. dasycarpa
- P. dehiscens
- P. demissa
- P. depressa
- P. divaricata
- P. donarium
- P. droseracea
- P. duclouxii
- P. dunniana
- P. dussii
- P. edentata
- P. eriogyna
- P. ernestii
- P. espinozana
- P. eximia
- P. floribunda
- P. formosana
- P. fortunensis
- P. fukudana
- P. fultonensis
- P. furuseana

=== Tropicos G-I ===
- P. ganman-zakura
- P. giraldiana
- P. glabra
- P. glyptocarya
- P. gongshanensis
- P. gracilifolia
- P. gravesii Small - synonym of P. maritima
- P. gymnodonta
- P. helenae
- P. herincquiana
- P. hiemalis
- P. hintonii
- P. hirsuta
- P. hirtifolia
- P. hisauchiana
- P. hosseusii
- P. icaco
- P. ichangana
- P. ignotus
- P. imanishii
- P. injucunda
- P. introrsa
- P. involucrata

=== Tropicos J-L ===
- P. kanehirai
- P. kanzakura
- P. kawakamii
- P. kerii
- P. kinkiensis
- P. kobuku-zakura
- P. kolomikta
- P. koshiensis
- P. lanata
- P. lannesiana
- P. latidentata
- P. laurifolia
- P. lichoana
- P. limbata
- P. lobulata

=== Tropicos M-O ===
- P. macgregoriana
- P. macrophylla
- P. mairei
- P. majestica
- P. malifolia
- P. marginata
- P. martabanica
- P. matuurae
- P. melanocarpa
- P. microbotrys
- P. microlepis, synonym of P. itosakura
- P. micromeloides
- P. mitis
- P. mochidzukiana
- P. mohacsyana
- P. mollis
- P. moniwana
- P. multipunctata
- P. mutabilis
- P. nakaii
- P. nana
- P. neglecta
- P. nepalensis
- P. nitens
- P. nitida
- P. novoleontis
- P. nubium
- P. odontocalyx
- P. oeconomica
- P. ohwii
- P. oregana
- P. oxycarpa
- P. oxyodonta
- P. oxyphylla

=== Tropicos P-R ===
- P. padifolia
- P. palmeri
- P. paniculata
- P. paniculatus
- P. paracerasus
- P. parksii
- P. pauciflora
- P. pendula
- P. petzoldii
- P. phyllopoda
- P. pilosa
- P. pinetorum
- P. pissardii
- P. platysepala
- P. pleifolia
- P. pleuroptera
- P. plurinervis
- P. podadenia
- P. polyandra
- P. potosina
- P. prionophylla
- P. prunella
- P. prunifolia
- P. pseudo-prostrata
- P. psilliflora
- P. pubescens Pursh - synonym of P. maritima
- P. pubigera
- P. puddum
- P. pulchella
- P. pumilus
- P. punctata
- P. pyramidalis
- P. quelpaertensis
- P. racemosa
- P. recurviflora
- P. rehderiana
- P. reticulata
- P. robustus
- P. rossiana
- P. rufomicans
- P. rufula
- P. rugosa
- P. rupestris

=== Tropicos S-U ===
- P. sacra
- P. sakabai
- P. saltuum
- P. sana
- P. sapidus
- P. sativa
- P. schiedeana
- P. schultzeae
- P. scopulorum
- P. sellowii
- P. semiarmillata
- P. semperflorens
- P. shirataki
- P. siltepecana
- P. sinensis
- P. skutchii
- P. sphaerocarpa
- P. sprengeri
- P. staminata
- P. steyermarkii
- P. stocksiana
- P. subcoriacea
- P. sundaica
- P. syodoi
- P. taiwaniana, synonym of P. itosakura
- P. tajimensis
- P. takasawana
- P. takenakae
- P. tama-clivorum
- P. tarda
- P. tenuiflora
- P. tenuifolia
- P. texensis
- P. thibetica
- P. tikalana
- P. tiliifolia
- P. tobagenzoana
- P. totan
- P. transarisanensis
- P. trichocarpa
- P. trichopetala
- P. triflora
- P. trilobus
- P. tschonoskii
- P. twymaniana
- P. urticaefolius
- P. utahensis

=== Tropicos V-Z ===
- P. valida
- P. vana
- P. venulosa
- P. venusta
- P. vulgaris
- P. watsonii
- P. wildeniana
- P. williamsii
- P. wurdackii
- P. xerocarpa
- P. yedoensis
- P. zappeyana

=== Tropicos hybrids ===
- Prunus × bukosanensis
- Prunus × domestica
- Prunus × takasawana

== GBIF list ==
The following additional species are accepted by the Global Biodiversity Information Facility (GBIF):

=== GBIF A-C ===
- P. acutangulata
- P. acutantulata
- P. andarobi
- P. azorica
- P. baccarii
- P. badilloi
- P. boissieri
- P. bullata
- P. caloneura
- P. chichibuensis
- P. cochinchinensis
- P. compta

=== GBIF D-F ===
- P. diamentina
- P. dolichophylla
- P. eminens
- P. erzincanica
- P. foveata
- P. fruticans
- P. fruticosa

=== GBIF G-I ===
- P. gideonii
- P. gondouinii
- P. guianensis
- P. harae
- P. hendersonii
- P. hixa
- P. insueta
- P. irvingi

=== GBIF J-L ===
- P. jalcata
- P. javorkae
- P. juddii
- P. kalkmanii
- P. kalmykovii
- P. kamiaranensis
- P. keredjensis
- P. kingdonwardii
- P. korschinskii
- P. kubotana
- P. kurdistanica
- P. lindleyi

=== GBIF M-O ===
- P. media
- P. mitsuminensis
- P. miyasakana
- P. miyoshii
- P. mochizukiana
- P. mozaffarianii
- P. myriocephala
- P. nikaii
- P. nota
- P. odorata
- P. oneyamensis
- P. orazii

=== GBIF P-R ===
- P. peritula
- P. pilioscula
- P. pittieri
- P. pseudoaffinis
- P. pugetensis Madrono, 2007 -synonym of Prunus × pugetensis

=== GBIF S-U ===
- P. saviczii
- P. schlecteri
- P. sefinensis
- P. singalilaensis
- P. slavinii
- P. solisii
- P. stacei
- P. tatsiensis
- P. uzbekistanica

=== GBIF V-Z ===
- P. vavilovii
- P. xingshanensis
- P. yaoiana
- P. yasujensis
- P. yuyamae
- P. zingii

=== GBIF hybrids ===
- Prunus × rhodia

== Others ==
=== Species ===
- P. apiculatus
- P. arbascensis
- P. arduennensis
- P. boldus
- P. claviculata
- P. delipavlovii
- P. dementis
- P. erectus
- P. flavescens
- P. ghahremanii
- P. hallasanensis
- P. hefengensis
- P. laoshanensis
- P. longispinosa
- P. jingningensis
- P. junghuhnianus
- P. kumanoensis
- P. maingayi
- P. matuurai
- P. mespilifolia
- P. morioka-pendula
- P. nutantiflora
- P. pananensis
- P. paradoxa
- P. reuteri
- P. rubicundus
- P. sunhangii
- P. tianshanica
- P. wangii
- P. xueluoensis
- P. yazdiana
- P. zhengheensis

=== Hybrids ===
- Prunus × armestica
- Prunus × cerea
- Prunus × limeixing
- Prunus persica × Prunus americana
- Prunus 'Starlight'

== Fossil species ==
Species described from isolated fossil foliage, fruits, or wood. Some may have been synonymized with other fossil Prunus species, other fossil genera, or even living species at some point after their description.

=== Fossil A-C ===
- P.? acutifolia Newberry, 1896 (Turonian, Raritan Formation, USA)
- P. aegaea Unger, 1867 (Early Miocene, Europe-Greenland)
- P. allenbyensis Cevallos-Ferriz & Stockey, 1990 (Ypresian, Allenby Formation, Canada)
- P. angustiserrata Ludwig, 1860 (Middle Pliocene, Europe)
- P.? antecedens Lesquereux, 1892 (Cretaceous?, Kansas, USA)
- P. antiqua Principi, 1914 (Oligocene, Piedmont Basin, Italy)
- P. ascendentiporulosa Suzuki, 1984 (Late Oligocene, Tsuyazaki, Japan)
- P. atlantica Unger - Synonym of P. nanodes
- P. attenuatifolia Palamarev & Petkova, 1987 (Volhynian, Krivodol Formation, Bulgaria)
- P. aucubaefolia Massalongo, 1858 (Oligocene-Miocene, Europe)
- P. aviiformis Mädler, 1939 (Piacenzian, Klärbecken Flora, Germany)
- P. axelrodi Wolfe, 1977 (Eocene, Kushtaka Formation, Alaska)
- P. barneti Wheeler & Dillhoff, 2009 (Middle Miocene, Columbia River Basalts, USA)
- P. calophylla
- P. calvertensis
- P. careyhurstia
- P. cathybrownae Benedict et al, 2011 (Ypresian, Klondike Mountain Formation, USA)
- P. cerasiformis
- P. chaneyi Condit, 1938 (Oligocene, Creede Formation, USA)
- P. coloradensis
- P. corrugis
- P. coveus
- P. crassa (Ludwig) Shimper, 1857 (Middle Pliocene, Saugbagger-Flora, Germany)
- P. creedensis Axelrod, 1987 (Oligocene, Creede Formation, USA)
- P. cretacea
- P. cylindrica Ludwig, 1857 (Middle Pliocene, Saugbagger-Flora, Germany)

=== Fossil D-F ===
- P. dakotensis Lesquereux (Eocene, Fort Union Formation, USA)
- P. daphnes Unger - synonym of P. daphnogene
- P. daphnogene Unger (Miocene, Radoboj, Croatia)
- P. denverensis Knowlton, 1930 (Cretaceous, Dawson formation, Colorado)
- P. deperdita Heer, 1859 (Late Peleocene, Menat Formation, France)
- P. druidum Ettingshausen & J.S.Gardner -syn P. eocenica
- P. dura
- P. echinata Ludwig, 1857 (Middle Pliocene, Saugbagger-Flora, Germany)
- P. eleanorae
- P. endoana
- P. ettingshausenii Ludwig, 1857 - synonym of P. crassa
- P. florinii
- P. fragilis
- P. franklinensis

=== Fossil G-I ===
- P. girardii Kirchheimer, 1949 (Middle Pliocene, Saugbagger-Flora, France)
- P. grandifolia
- P. gummosa (Platan.) Wheeler et al, 1978 (Eocene, Yellowstone Formation, USA)
- P. hanhardtii Heer, 1859 (Miocene?, Öhningen, Switzerland)
- P. harneyensis
- P. hartungi Heer, 1869 (Eocene, Svetlogorsk, Kaliningrad Oblast)
- P. herbstii (Ludwig) Schimper, 1857 (Middle Pliocene, Saugbagger-Flora, Germany)
- P. hirsutipetala
- P. ishidae
- P. ishidai
- P. iwatense (Watari) Takahashi & Suzuki, 1988 (Middle Miocene, Japan)

=== Fossil J-L ===
- P. juglandiformis
- P. kenaica
- P. kryshtofovichii
- P. kunmingensis
- P. laeta
- P. langsdorfii Kirchheimer, 1935 (Early Oligocene-Middle Miocene, Europe)
- P. leporimontana
- P. lyoniifolia

=== Fossil M-O ===
- P. maclearnii
- P. marchica
- P. masoni
- P. masonii
- P. matsumaensis
- P. maxima
- P. mclearni
- P. merriami
- P. microdonta
- P. micropyrenula Heer, 1869 (mid-late Oligocene, Rixhöft, Poland)
- P. microserrata
- P. miobrachypoda
- P. miodavidiana
- P. mohikana
- P. moragensis
- P. moselensis
- P. nabortensis Berry (late Eocene, Wilcox Group, USA)
- P. nanodes Unger, 1854 (Miocene-Pliocene, Europe)
- P. nathorstii
- P. nerchauensis
- P. nevadensis
- P. obtusa Ludwig, 1857 - synonym of P. crassa
- P. odessana
- P. okutsui
- P. olsonii Manchester (Middle Eocene, Clarno Formation, USA)
- P. olympica Ettingshausen (Miocene?, "Bohemia")
- P. ornata Ludwig, 1857 - synonym of P. crassa

=== Fossil P-R ===
- P. palaeocerasus Ettingshausen, 1888 (Middle Miocene, Steiermark, Austria)
- P. palaeozippeliana Suzuki, 1984 (Late Oligocene, Tsuyazaki, Japan)
- P. paradisiaca
- P. parlatorei
- P. parvicarpa
- P. parvula Ludwig, 1857 (Middle Pliocene, Saugbagger-Flora, Germany)
- P. pereger
- P. perita
- P. petrosperma
- P. pliovenosa
- P. polyporulosa Suzuki, 1984 (Late Oligocene, Tsuyazaki, Japan)
- P. praecommunis
- P. preandersonii
- P. prefasciculata
- P. prefremontii
- P. prinoides
- P. prisca Ettingshausen & J.S.Gardner -syn P. eocenica
- P. pristina
- P. protossiori
- P. pyrifolia
- P. rodgersae Wheeler & Dillhoff, 2009 (Middle Miocene, Columbia River Basalts, USA)
- P. rubeshibensis
- P. rugosa
- P. russana Ludwig, 1857 (Pliocene?, Hannau, Germany)
- P. rustii

=== Fossil S-U ===
- P. sambucifolia
- P. scharfii
- P. schlechtendalii
- P. scottii Heer (Eocene, Greenland)
- P.? staratschini Heer, 1870 (Eocene?, Spitzbergen)
- P. stewarti (Lesquereux) MacGinitie (Ypresian, Green River Formation, USA)
- P. stipitata Reid & E. Reid, 1915 (Pliocene, Limburg, Netherlands)
- P. subserotina
- P. tanaii
- P. tenerirugosa
- P. tenuiputamenta Reid & Reid, 1915 (Pliocene, Limburg, Netherlands)
- P. tenuis Ludwig, 1857 - synonym of P. crassa
- P. terrae-albae
- P. tertiaria
- P. treasheri
- P. tufacea
- P. turlockensis
- P. uviporulosa Suzuki, 1984 (Late Oligocene, Tsuyazaki, Japan)

=== Fossil V-Z ===
- P. variabilis Newberry (Eocene, Cook Inlet, USA)
- P. weinsteinii Manchester (Middle Eocene, Clarno Formation, USA)
- P. wadiai Guleria, et al, 1983 (Middle Miocene, Kargil Formation, India)
- P. wutuensis Li et al (Early Eocene, Wutu Formation, China)
- P. zeuschneri

=== Reclassified Fossil species ===
- P. askenasyi Kinkelin (Piacenzian, Klärbecken Flora, Germany) -Synonym of Carya moenana Kircheimer
- P. aspensis Brown, 1933 (Albian, Aspen Shale, USA) - Considered an incertae sedis angiosperm
- P. bilinica Ettingshausen, 1869 (Eocene -Early Oligocene, Europe) -Synonym of Iodes bilinica (Ettingshausen) Stull, Adams, Man-chester & Collinson, 2016 (including Palaeohosiea suleticensis Kvaček & Bůžek, 1995)
- P. denticulata Velenovsky, 1882 (Middle Miocene, Vrsovice, Czech Republic) -Synonym in part of Alnus gaudinii (foliage), and fruits considered Carpolithes sp.
- P. eocenica considered likely an Icacinaceae fruit
- P. euri Unger (Miocene, Parschlug coal basin, Austria) -Synonym of Cedrelospermum ulmifolium (Unger) Kovar-Eder & Kvaček
- P. theodisca Unger (Miocene, Parschlug coal basin, Austria) -Synonym of Quercus mediterranea Unger
