= Prunus erythroxylon =

Scientific classification
- Kingdom: Plantae
- Clade: Tracheophytes
- Clade: Angiosperms
- Clade: Eudicots
- Clade: Rosids
- Order: Rosales
- Family: Rosaceae
- Genus: Prunus
- Species: P. erythroxylon

Binomial name
- Prunus erythroxylon Koehne

Species of tree

Prunus erythroxylon (called palo prieto, or black stick) is a species of Prunus found in the montane cloud forests of Mexico. It has oblong to oval leaves that are less than 14 cm long, small 8 mm flowers and black fruit. It may be conspecific with Prunus brachybotrya.
