= Prunus guanaiensis =

Scientific classification
- Kingdom: Plantae
- Clade: Tracheophytes
- Clade: Angiosperms
- Clade: Eudicots
- Clade: Rosids
- Order: Rosales
- Family: Rosaceae
- Genus: Prunus
- Species: P. guanaiensis

Binomial name
- Prunus guanaiensis Rusby

Synonyms
- Prunus ernestii García-Barr.

Species of plant

Prunus guanaiensis is a species of tree in the family Rosaceae. It is native to western South America. Its phenotype suggests close affinity with three other South American species of Prunus; P. debilis, P. littlei and P. wurdackii.

== Distribution and habitat ==
Prunus guanaiensis occurs in montane forests from Colombia south to Bolivia, between 500 – 2000 m of elevation.
