= Prunus lundelliana =

Scientific classification
- Kingdom: Plantae
- Clade: Tracheophytes
- Clade: Angiosperms
- Clade: Eudicots
- Clade: Rosids
- Order: Rosales
- Family: Rosaceae
- Genus: Prunus
- Species: P. lundelliana

Binomial name
- Prunus lundelliana Standl.

Species of flowering plant

Prunus lundelliana, Spanish: taquicui, and nail wamal in the Tzeltal language, is a species flowering plant in the family Rosaceae native to southern Mexico and to northern Central America. It is a tree reaching 10 m. A common understory species in montane cloud forests, it prefers to grow on the sides of streams. It resembles Prunus tetradenia, but with significantly smaller leaves, and in the position of certain of the leaf glands. The wood is dense and darkly colored. The white 4 to 6 mm flowers are borne on axillary racemes. The fruit, a drupe, is black, 8 to 10 mm, with very little flesh.
