= Prunus debilis =

Conservation status
- Least Concern (IUCN 3.1)

Scientific classification
- Kingdom: Plantae
- Clade: Tracheophytes
- Clade: Angiosperms
- Clade: Eudicots
- Clade: Rosids
- Order: Rosales
- Family: Rosaceae
- Genus: Prunus
- Species: P. debilis

Binomial name
- Prunus debilis Koehne

Synonyms
- Prunus vana J.F.Macbride; Prunus williamsii J.F.Macbride

Species of plant

Prunus debilis is a South American species of Prunus. Its phenotype suggests close affinity with three other South American species of Prunus; P. littlei, P. guanaiensis and P. wurdackii. The Jivaro people chew the pulp of its fruit to alleviate the pain of toothaches.
