= Prunus oleifolia =

Scientific classification
- Kingdom: Plantae
- Clade: Tracheophytes
- Clade: Angiosperms
- Clade: Eudicots
- Clade: Rosids
- Order: Rosales
- Family: Rosaceae
- Genus: Prunus
- Species: P. oleifolia

Binomial name
- Prunus oleifolia Koehne

Species of tree

Prunus oleifolia is a species of Prunus native to southern South America, including Bolivia, Paraguay, Brazil and Argentina. It is a tree 5–18 m tall. In spite of some confusion involving its missing holotype and poor descriptions, it is a good species, and a close relative of Prunus reflexa.
