= Prunus tatsienensis =

Scientific classification
- Kingdom: Plantae
- Clade: Tracheophytes
- Clade: Angiosperms
- Clade: Eudicots
- Clade: Rosids
- Order: Rosales
- Family: Rosaceae
- Genus: Prunus
- Species: P. tatsienensis

Binomial name
- Prunus tatsienensis Batalin

Synonyms
- Cerasus tatsienensis (Batalin) T.T.Yu & C.L.Li

Species of tree

Prunus tatsienensis (Chinese: 康定樱桃) is a putative species of cherry native to Henan, Hubei, Shaanxi, Shanxi, Sichuan and Yunnan provinces of China, typically found at 900–2600 m above sea level. It is a shrub or low tree 2–5 m tall. It differs from Prunus polytricha in that it has disciform apical glands in the margins of its bracts. This trait is not found in the original description and is not found in the type specimen, suggesting that it is conspecific with Prunus polytricha and with Prunus clarofolia, which also lacks sufficiently differing characters.
