= Prunus aitchisonii =

Scientific classification
- Kingdom: Plantae
- Clade: Tracheophytes
- Clade: Angiosperms
- Clade: Eudicots
- Clade: Rosids
- Order: Rosales
- Family: Rosaceae
- Genus: Prunus
- Species: P. aitchisonii

Binomial name
- Prunus aitchisonii (Korsh.) Kitam.

Synonyms
- Amygdalus aitchisonii Korsh.

Disputed species of wild almond from Afghanistan and Pakistan

Prunus aitchisonii is a putative species of wild almond native to Afghanistan and nearby areas of Pakistan. A genetic and morphological study has shown that it is conspecific with Prunus kuramica.
