= Prunus rhamnoides =

Scientific classification
- Kingdom: Plantae
- Clade: Tracheophytes
- Clade: Angiosperms
- Clade: Eudicots
- Clade: Rosids
- Order: Rosales
- Family: Rosaceae
- Genus: Prunus
- Species: P. rhamnoides

Binomial name
- Prunus rhamnoides Koehne

Synonyms
- Prunus barbata Koehne (Note: Along with Prunus salasii, Prunus barbata is known as cerezo); Prunus cornifolia Koehne (Note: Prunus cornifolia is a synonym often used in Costa Rica)

Species of flowering plant

Prunus rhamnoides, Spanish: coralillo, Nahuatl languages: calaomit, and also iza (Note: source language unknown) and mataiza, (Note: many (also) refer to Sapium pedicellatum (a synonym of Sapium macrocarpum)) is a species of Prunus in the family Rosaceae. It is native to Mexico and Central America. It is a tree 7.5 to 15 m tall. A shade tolerant species, it is considered an indicator of forest health. Local people use its timber for construction and household implements.
