= Prunus mirabilis =

Prunus mirabilis is the name of a cherry tree species, which may refer to:

- Prunus mirabilis Poit. & Turpin, described in 1810, now considered a synonym of Prunus cerasifera
- Prunus mirabilis Sumnev., described in 1955, an illegitimate later homonym, now considered a synonym of Prunus cerasifera
- Prunus mirabilis Kalkman, described in 1965, an illegitimate later homonym, now known as Prunus kalkmanii
