= Prunus kuramica =

Scientific classification
- Kingdom: Plantae
- Clade: Tracheophytes
- Clade: Angiosperms
- Clade: Eudicots
- Clade: Rosids
- Order: Rosales
- Family: Rosaceae
- Genus: Prunus
- Species: P. kuramica

Binomial name
- Prunus kuramica (Korsh.) Kitam

Synonyms
- Amygdalus kuramica Korsh.

Species of wild almond from Afghanistan and Pakistan

Prunus kuramica is a species of wild almond native to Afghanistan and mainly Pakistan. It is a dense shrub or tree 1 to 5 m tall, with purplish-red hypanthia and sepals, and white or pink petals. It prefers to grow in xeric woodlands with Quercus and Juniper species, typically in rocky ravines at 1800 to 2850 m above sea level. A genetic study showed that is closely related to Prunus bucharica, P. webbii and P. kotschyi, and a full genetic and morphological analysis shows that its closest relative is Prunus bucharica.
