= Prunus versteeghii =

Scientific classification
- Kingdom: Plantae
- Clade: Tracheophytes
- Clade: Angiosperms
- Clade: Eudicots
- Clade: Rosids
- Order: Rosales
- Family: Rosaceae
- Genus: Prunus
- Species: P. versteeghii

Binomial name
- Prunus versteeghii Kalkman

Synonyms
- Pygeum versteeghii (Kalkm.)

Species of tree

Prunus versteeghii is a species of Prunus native to the island of New Guinea. It is a tree reaching 25 m with strongly‑smelling grey (sometimes brown) bark. Its herbaceous leaves are oblong to oblong‑ovate, 10 to 15 cm long and 4 to 8 cm wide, having rounded to acute bases and acute apices, and two flat basal glands. Its inflorescences have triangular hairy sepals, only about 1 mm long. The petals are elliptic to obovate, also only 1 mm long and hairy. The flowers have 35 to 45 stamens each, with 1.5 mm long filaments and 0.5 to 0.7 mm long anthers. The fruits are purplish‑black when ripe, have thick mesocarps, and endocarps which are glabrous inside. Its seeds have glabrous testa.
