= Prunus amplifolia =

Scientific classification
- Kingdom: Plantae
- Clade: Tracheophytes
- Clade: Angiosperms
- Clade: Eudicots
- Clade: Rosids
- Order: Rosales
- Family: Rosaceae
- Genus: Prunus
- Species: P. amplifolia

Binomial name
- Prunus amplifolia Pilg.

Species of plant

Prunus amplifolia is a species of Prunus native to South America, including Bolivia, Peru and Venezuela. It goes by a number of common names, including jihuí and xoco in the Chakobo language.
