= Prunus turcomanica =

Scientific classification
- Kingdom: Plantae
- Clade: Tracheophytes
- Clade: Angiosperms
- Clade: Eudicots
- Clade: Rosids
- Order: Rosales
- Family: Rosaceae
- Genus: Prunus
- Species: P. turcomanica

Binomial name
- Prunus turcomanica (Lincz.) Kitam.

Synonyms
- Amygdalus spinosissima subsp. turcomanica (Lincz.) Browicz; Amygdalus turcomanica Lincz.; Cerasus turcomanica Pojark.; Microcerasus prostrata f. turcomanica (Pojark.) Eremin & Juschev; Prunus griffithii var. turcomanica (Pojark.) Ingram

Disputed species of wild almond from Iran and Turkmenistan

Prunus turcomanica is a species of flowering plant in the family Rosaceae. This wild almond is sometimes referred to by the common name the Turkmen almond and is native to Iran, Turkmenistan and possibly eastern Turkey. A genetic and morphological study has shown that it is conspecific with Prunus spinosissima.
