= Prunus cortapico =

Conservation status
- Least Concern (IUCN 3.1)

Scientific classification
- Kingdom: Plantae
- Clade: Tracheophytes
- Clade: Angiosperms
- Clade: Eudicots
- Clade: Rosids
- Order: Rosales
- Family: Rosaceae
- Genus: Prunus
- Species: P. cortapico

Binomial name
- Prunus cortapico Kerber ex Koehne

Synonyms
- Prunus skutchii I.M. Johnst.

Species of tree

Prunus cortapico is a species of tree in the family Rosaceae, and is native to Mexico, Guatemala and El Salvador.
