= Prunus samydoides =

Scientific classification
- Kingdom: Plantae
- Clade: Embryophytes
- Clade: Tracheophytes
- Clade: Angiosperms
- Clade: Eudicots
- Clade: Rosids
- Order: Rosales
- Family: Rosaceae
- Genus: Prunus
- Species: P. samydoides

Binomial name
- Prunus samydoides Schlecht.

Synonyms
- Cerasus samydoides (Schltdl.) Walp.; Laurocerasus samydoides (Schlecht.) Roem.; Prunus potosina Lundell

Species of tree

Prunus samydoides is a species of Prunus native to Mexico. It is a small tree, with approximately 9 cm long oval-lanceolate evergreen leaves.

== Ecology ==
It is found growing in montane cloud forests of eastern Mexico, some of which are relict Fagus mexicana stands.
