= Prunus clementis =

Conservation status
- Near Threatened (IUCN 2.3)

Scientific classification
- Kingdom: Plantae
- Clade: Tracheophytes
- Clade: Angiosperms
- Clade: Eudicots
- Clade: Rosids
- Order: Rosales
- Family: Rosaceae
- Genus: Prunus
- Species: P. clementis

Binomial name
- Prunus clementis (Merr.) Kalkman

Synonyms
- Pygeum clementis Merr.

Species of plant

Prunus clementis is a species of plant in the family Rosaceae. It is found in Sulawesi and the Philippines.
