= Prunus gentryi =

Conservation status
- Least Concern (IUCN 3.1)

Scientific classification
- Kingdom: Plantae
- Clade: Embryophytes
- Clade: Tracheophytes
- Clade: Angiosperms
- Clade: Eudicots
- Clade: Rosids
- Order: Rosales
- Family: Rosaceae
- Genus: Prunus
- Species: P. gentryi

Binomial name
- Prunus gentryi Standl.

Species of flowering plant

Prunus gentryi is a Mexican species of wild cherry in the genus Prunus, part of the rose family.

== Description ==
Prunus gentryi is a tree up to 12 metres (39 feet) tall. The leaves are thick and leathery, dark green above and lighter below. The fruits are juicy and generally purple except in P. gentryi forma flavipulpa, known from the State of Chihuahua, in which they are yellow and reportedly sweeter.

The scientific description was published in 1937.

== Distribution and habitat ==
The species is native to the Mexican states of Chihuahua and Sonora. It grows along streambanks in mountainous regions of the Sierra Madre Occidental.

== Uses ==
The Mountain Pima (= Pima Bajo) of the region near Yepachic, Chihuahua, call the tree and its fruits "aguasiqui". The fruits are a prized food, ripening in late summer.
