= Prunus marsupialis =

Conservation status
- Least Concern (IUCN 2.3)

Scientific classification
- Kingdom: Plantae
- Clade: Tracheophytes
- Clade: Angiosperms
- Clade: Eudicots
- Clade: Rosids
- Order: Rosales
- Family: Rosaceae
- Genus: Prunus
- Species: P. marsupialis

Binomial name
- Prunus marsupialis Kalkm.

Synonyms
- Pygeum glandulosum Merr.

Species of plant

Prunus marsupialis is a species of plant in the family Rosaceae. It is found in the Philippines and Taiwan.
