= Prunus spicata =

Scientific classification
- Kingdom: Plantae
- Clade: Tracheophytes
- Clade: Angiosperms
- Clade: Eudicots
- Clade: Rosids
- Order: Rosales
- Family: Rosaceae
- Genus: Prunus
- Species: P. spicata

Binomial name
- Prunus spicata Kalkman

Synonyms
- Pygeum spicatum (Kalkm.)

Species of tree

Prunus spicata is a species of Prunus native to the islands of Borneo (Malaysia) and Luzon (Philippines). It is a tree, usually 12 m but reaching 25 m tall, with purplish or brownish bark. Its herbaceous leaves are elliptic to oblong or lanceolate to ovate, 6 to 18 cm long and 2.5 to 6.5 cm wide, having rounded bases and acute, long tapering or acuminate apices, and zero to two (sometimes four) flat basal glands. Stipules also have glands. Leaves are hairy when young, and usually retain some hairs on their undersides when mature. The flowers have 15 to 30 stamens each, with up to 4 mm long filaments and 0.3 to 0.5 mm long anthers. The ovaries are densely hairy. The fruits are red (possibly black) when ripe, and have endocarps which are glabrous inside. Its seeds have glabrous testa.
