= Prunus brachystachya =

Scientific classification
- Kingdom: Plantae
- Clade: Tracheophytes
- Clade: Angiosperms
- Clade: Eudicots
- Clade: Rosids
- Order: Rosales
- Family: Rosaceae
- Genus: Prunus
- Subgenus: Prunus subg. Cerasus
- Species: P. brachystachya

Binomial name
- Prunus brachystachya Kalkman

Synonyms
- Prunus grisea (C.Mueller) Kalkman var. grisea; Pygeum griseum C.Mueller, Walpers; Pygeum brachystachyum (Kalkm.)

Species of plant

Prunus brachystachya is a species of Prunus native to Papua New Guinea and Queensland, Australia, where it is called the Claudie almond. It prefers to grow in rainforests and the banks of rivers, from sea level up to about 450 m. It is a tree with gray to brown bark, usually about 15 m but reaching 26 m. Its flowers are borne on a raceme and its hairy petals can be white or pale green. Its sepals are hairy as well. Its juicy fruit are red to black, and relished by cassowaries.
