= Prunus beccarii =

Scientific classification
- Kingdom: Plantae
- Clade: Tracheophytes
- Clade: Angiosperms
- Clade: Eudicots
- Clade: Rosids
- Order: Rosales
- Family: Rosaceae
- Genus: Prunus
- Species: P. beccarii

Binomial name
- Prunus beccarii (Ridl.) Kalkman

Synonyms
- Pygeum beccarii Ridl.

Species of tree

Prunus beccarii is a species of Prunus native to Borneo with a few sterile specimens discovered on Sumatra. It is a tree reaching 27 m and can be distinguished from similar species by the absence of any basal leaf glands but the presence of a large hollow gland in its stipules. Among the Penan people it is called betolei, a name they also give to the much more common Prunus arborea.
