= Prunus annularis =

Scientific classification
- Kingdom: Plantae
- Clade: Tracheophytes
- Clade: Angiosperms
- Clade: Eudicots
- Clade: Rosids
- Order: Rosales
- Family: Rosaceae
- Genus: Prunus
- Species: P. annularis

Binomial name
- Prunus annularis Koehne

Synonyms
- Laurocerasus annularis (Koehne) Kovalev; Prunus fortunensis (G.McPherson) Morales

Species of flowering plant

Prunus annularis (Spanish: duraznillo) is a species of Prunus in the family Rosaceae. It is native to cloud forests along the Pacific coasts of Mexico and Central America. It is a tree 5 to 12 m tall. It is fed upon by caterpillars of the genus Oxynetra.
