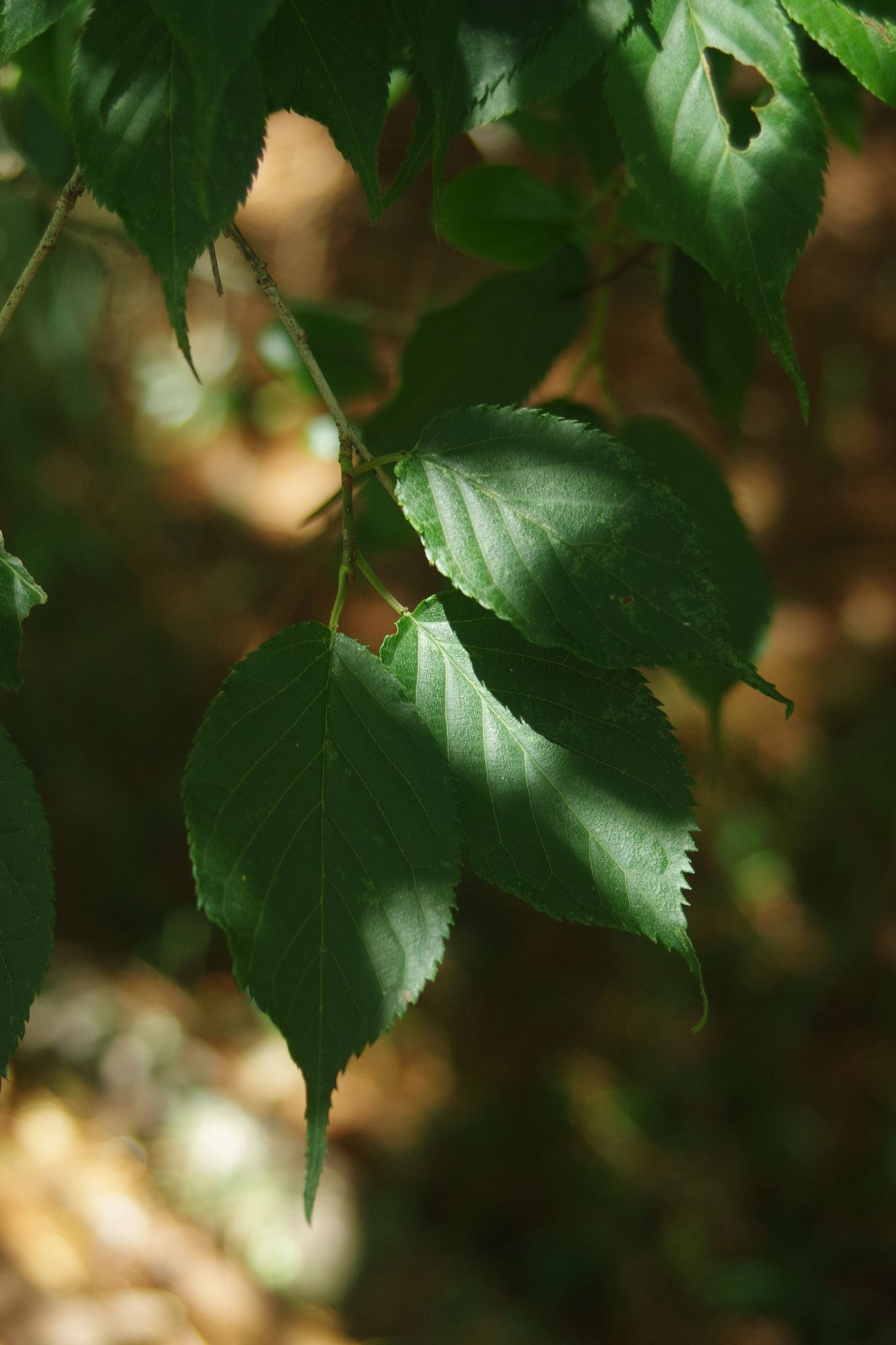

Conservation status
- Near Threatened (IUCN 2.3)

Scientific classification
- Kingdom: Plantae
- Clade: Tracheophytes
- Clade: Angiosperms
- Clade: Eudicots
- Clade: Rosids
- Order: Rosales
- Family: Rosaceae
- Genus: Prunus
- Subgenus: Prunus subg. Cerasus
- Species: P. transarisanensis

Binomial name
- Prunus transarisanensis Hayata

= Prunus transarisanensis =

Species of plant

Prunus transarisanensis is a species of plant in the family Rosaceae. It is endemic to Taiwan. The similar species Prunus takasagomontana, also endemic to Taiwan, is thought by some authorities to be conspecific.
