= Prunus zhengheensis =

Scientific classification
- Kingdom: Plantae
- Clade: Tracheophytes
- Clade: Angiosperms
- Clade: Eudicots
- Clade: Rosids
- Order: Rosales
- Family: Rosaceae
- Genus: Prunus
- Species: P. zhengheensis

Binomial name
- Prunus zhengheensis (J.Y. Zhang & M.N. Lu) Y.H. Tong & N.H. Xia

Synonyms
- Armeniaca zhengheensis J.Y. Zhang & M.N. Lu

Species of plant

Prunus zhengheensis (Chinese: 政和杏) is a species of apricot found in Fujian province of China. It is only known from one county, Zhenghe. It is a tree 35 to 40 m tall, preferring to grow at 700 to 1000 m above sea level. The yellow fruit is delectable. A morphological study had said that it was conspecific with Prunus mume, despite its greater height.
