= Prunus javanica =

Conservation status
- Least Concern (IUCN 2.3)

Scientific classification
- Kingdom: Plantae
- Clade: Tracheophytes
- Clade: Angiosperms
- Clade: Eudicots
- Clade: Rosids
- Order: Rosales
- Family: Rosaceae
- Genus: Prunus
- Species: P. javanica

Binomial name
- Prunus javanica (Teijsm. & Binn.) Miq.

Synonyms
- Cerasus javanica Teijsm. & Binn.; Cerasus martabanica Wall.; Decaspermum alternifolium (Miq.) Nied.; Laurocerasus javanica (Teijsm. & Binn.) C.K. Schneid.; Laurocerasus martabanica (Kurz) C.K.Schneid.; Prunus forbesii Koehne; Prunus junghuhniana Miq.; Prunus martabanica Kurz; Prunus nitens Craib; Prunus nitida Koehne; Prunus oblonga Korth. (not J.F.Macbr.); Prunus papuana Koehne; Prunus scortechinii Koehne; Pygeum glabrifolium Baker f.; Pygeum nitidum Pierre

Species of plant

Prunus javanica is a species of plant in the family Rosaceae. It is found in India, Indonesia, Malaysia, and Myanmar.
