= Prunus rubiginosa =

Conservation status
- Near Threatened (IUCN 3.1)

Scientific classification
- Kingdom: Plantae
- Clade: Tracheophytes
- Clade: Angiosperms
- Clade: Eudicots
- Clade: Rosids
- Order: Rosales
- Family: Rosaceae
- Genus: Prunus
- Species: P. rubiginosa

Binomial name
- Prunus rubiginosa (Elmer) Kalkman

Synonyms
- Pygeum rubiginosum Elmer; Pygeum elmerianum Koehne

Species of plant

Prunus rubiginosa is a species of plant in the family Rosaceae. It is endemic to the Philippines.
