= Prunus × pugetensis =

Scientific classification
- Kingdom: Plantae
- Clade: Tracheophytes
- Clade: Angiosperms
- Clade: Eudicots
- Clade: Rosids
- Order: Rosales
- Family: Rosaceae
- Genus: Prunus
- Subgenus: Prunus subg. Cerasus
- Species: P. × pugetensis

Binomial name
- Prunus × pugetensis A.L.Jacobson & Zika

Species of flowering plant

Prunus × pugetensis is a hybrid species of cherry discovered growing in the Pacific Northwest region of North America. It has been given the nominal common name Puget Sound cherry. It is a cross of introduced sweet cherry, Prunus avium, and native Oregon cherry, Prunus emarginata. Individuals have been found growing in British Columbia, Washington state and Oregon, in the natural range of P. emarginata. It differs from P. avium in a number of features, including having narrower leaves and smaller flowers carried on a peduncle. Conversely, it has broader leaves and larger flowers than P. emarginata. The chief difference from its parents is that its flowers almost always abort, and it rarely bears any fruit.
