= Prunus littlei =

Scientific classification
- Kingdom: Plantae
- Clade: Tracheophytes
- Clade: Angiosperms
- Clade: Eudicots
- Clade: Rosids
- Order: Rosales
- Family: Rosaceae
- Genus: Prunus
- Species: P. littlei

Binomial name
- Prunus littlei Pérez Zab.

Species of tree

Prunus littlei is a species of tree in the family Rosaceae. It is native to mountain forests of northwestern South America. Its phenotype suggests close affinity with three other South American species of Prunus; P. debilis, P. guanaiensis and P. wurdackii.
