= Prunus trichantha =

Scientific classification
- Kingdom: Plantae
- Clade: Tracheophytes
- Clade: Angiosperms
- Clade: Eudicots
- Clade: Rosids
- Order: Rosales
- Family: Rosaceae
- Tribe: Amygdaleae
- Genus: Prunus
- Species: P. trichantha

Binomial name
- Prunus trichantha Koehne

Synonyms
- Prunus rufa var. trichantha (Koehne) H.Hara; Cerasus rufa var. trichantha (Koehne) T.T.Yu & L.T.Lu; Cerasus trichantha (Koehne) C.L.Li & S.Y.Jiang; Prunus imanishii S. Kitamura

Species of flowering plant

Prunus trichantha, (Chinese: 毛瓣藏樱 "hairy petal Tibetan cherry"), is a species of Prunus native to the Himalayas (Tibet, Sikkim and Nepal), preferring to grow at 2800–3900 m. It is typically a tree 2-10 m tall.
