= Prunus pulgarensis =

Conservation status
- Endangered (IUCN 3.1)

Scientific classification
- Kingdom: Plantae
- Clade: Tracheophytes
- Clade: Angiosperms
- Clade: Eudicots
- Clade: Rosids
- Order: Rosales
- Family: Rosaceae
- Genus: Prunus
- Species: P. pulgarensis

Binomial name
- Prunus pulgarensis (Elmer) Kalkman

Synonyms
- Pygeum pulgarense Elmer; Pygeum monticola Merr.

Species of plant

Prunus pulgarensis is a species of plant in the family Rosaceae. It is endemic to the Philippines. It is threatened by habitat loss.
