= Prunus malayana =

Conservation status
- Least Concern (IUCN 2.3)

Scientific classification
- Kingdom: Plantae
- Clade: Tracheophytes
- Clade: Angiosperms
- Clade: Eudicots
- Clade: Rosids
- Order: Rosales
- Family: Rosaceae
- Genus: Prunus
- Species: P. malayana

Binomial name
- Prunus malayana Kalkman

Synonyms
- Pygeum malayanum (Kalkm.)

Species of tree

Prunus malayana is a species of plant in the family Rosaceae. It is a tree endemic to Peninsular Malaysia.
