= Prunus oblonga =

Scientific classification
- Kingdom: Plantae
- Clade: Tracheophytes
- Clade: Angiosperms
- Clade: Eudicots
- Clade: Rosids
- Order: Rosales
- Family: Rosaceae
- Genus: Prunus
- Species: P. oblonga

Binomial name
- Prunus oblonga J.F.Macbr.

Species of flowering plant

Prunus oblonga is a species of Prunus native to Peru.
