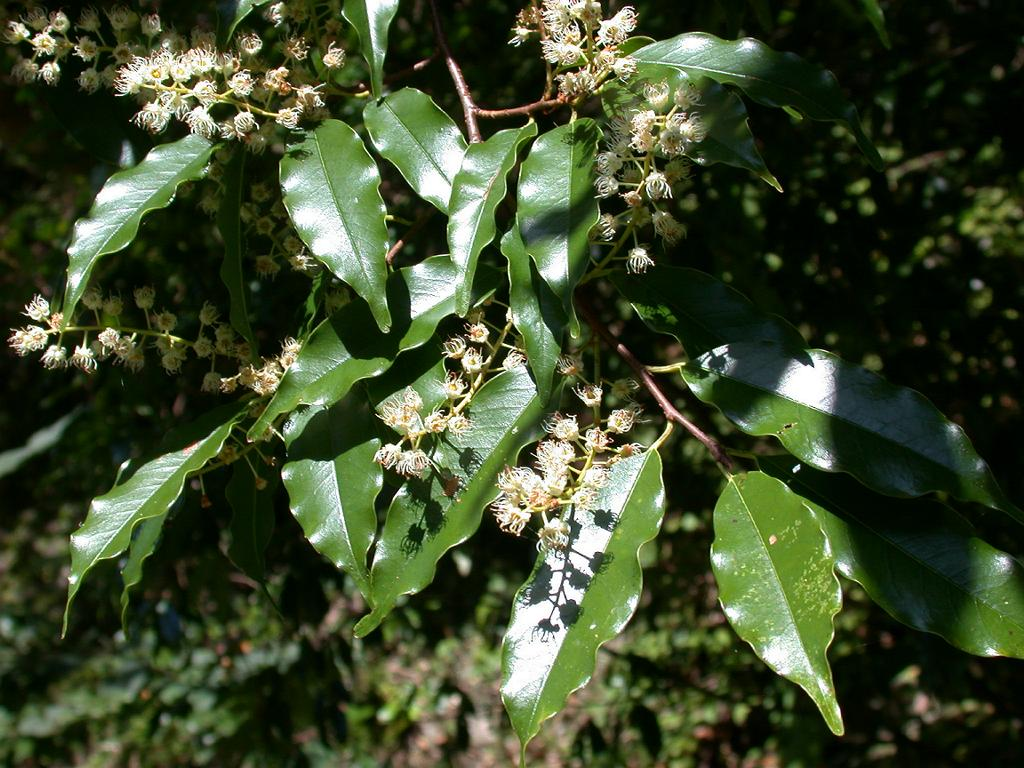
- Leaves and flowers

Scientific classification
- Kingdom: Plantae
- Clade: Tracheophytes
- Clade: Angiosperms
- Clade: Eudicots
- Clade: Rosids
- Order: Rosales
- Family: Rosaceae
- Genus: Prunus
- Section: P. sect. Laurocerasus
- Species: P. spinulosa

Binomial name
- Prunus spinulosa Siebold & Zucc.

Synonyms
- Laurocerasus spinulosa (Sieb. & Zucc.) C.K.Schneid.; Prunus balfourii Cardot; Prunus limbata Cardot; Prunus nitidissima Hassk.; Prunus sundaica Miq.; Laurocerasus marginata (Dunn) T.T.Yu & L.T.Lu; Prunus marginata Dunn

= Prunus spinulosa =

Species of plant

Prunus spinulosa is an evergreen species of cherry-laurel native to southeastern China and warmer parts of Japan. Its lustrous leaves superficially resemble those of holly. Individual trees can reach 20 m, and are typically found growing in places with high ambient humidity, such as forested areas near larger rivers.
