= Prunus turfosa =

Conservation status
- Endangered (IUCN 2.3)

Scientific classification
- Kingdom: Plantae
- Clade: Tracheophytes
- Clade: Angiosperms
- Clade: Eudicots
- Clade: Rosids
- Order: Rosales
- Family: Rosaceae
- Genus: Prunus
- Species: P. turfosa

Binomial name
- Prunus turfosa Kalkman

Synonyms
- Pygeum turfosum (Kalkm.)

Species of plant

Prunus turfosa is a species of plant in the family Rosaceae, found in; Kalimantan, Indonesia; Sarawak, Malaysia; and possibly Brunei. The plant is restricted to peat swamp forests. As of 1998, the plant was categorised as Endangered by the IUCN on their "Red List" due to licensing of peat swamp forests of Sarawak to be logged.
