= Prunus huantensis =

Scientific classification
- Kingdom: Plantae
- Clade: Embryophytes
- Clade: Tracheophytes
- Clade: Angiosperms
- Clade: Eudicots
- Clade: Rosids
- Order: Rosales
- Family: Rosaceae
- Genus: Prunus
- Species: P. huantensis

Binomial name
- Prunus huantensis Koehne

Species of tree

Prunus huantensis is a South American species of tree found in montane forests.

== Description ==
It is a shrub or tree up to 27 metres (89 feet) tall, with brown lenticellate branchlets. The leaves are 6.5–17 centimetres (2 1/2–6 3/4 inches) long and 3.5–7 cm (1 1/2–2 3/4 in) wide. They are ovate with a rounded base, rigid but leathery, and finely toothed.

The flowers are arranged in an elongated raceme up to 17 cm long. The sepals are 1 mm long and the petals up to 3 millimetres (1/8 in). The fruits are black, spherical, and up to 1.9 cm (3/4 in) wide.

== Taxonomy ==
Prunus huantensis may be a synonym of Prunus brittoniana.

== Distribution and habitat ==
The species can be found in mountain forests at elevations of 2,500–3,500 m (8,200–11,500 ft), from southern Colombia to central Peru.

== Regional names ==
Names recorded for this species are: inca-inca (in central Peru); pipe (in Pataz Province, northern Peru); pandala or pundé (southern Colombia); sacha capulí, capulí, laurel or canelón (in Ecuador).
