= Prunus cyclamina =

Scientific classification
- Kingdom: Plantae
- Clade: Tracheophytes
- Clade: Angiosperms
- Clade: Eudicots
- Clade: Rosids
- Order: Rosales
- Family: Rosaceae
- Genus: Prunus
- Subgenus: Prunus subg. Cerasus
- Species: P. cyclamina

Binomial name
- Prunus cyclamina Koehne

Synonyms
- Cerasus cyclamina (Koehne) T.T.Yü & C.L.Li; Prunus malifolia Koehne

Species of tree

Prunus cyclamina, called the cyclamin cherry (or cyclamen cherry), the Chinese flowering cherry, and in Chinese: 襄阳山樱桃, the Xiangyang mountain cherry, is a species of flowering cherry native to China, preferring to grow at 1000–1300 m above sea level. It has prolific, attractive pale pink flowers that bloom early and outlast many later-blooming cherries and, accordingly, excellent potential as an ornamental. In the Arnold Arboretum in Massachusetts two individuals have prospered for decades, never showing any signs of the typical diseases—including the nematodes, viruses and black knot—that afflict their Prunus neighbors.

== Description ==
It is robust tree, usually 5 to 10 m tall. Its bark is a dark purplish‑brown with prominent lenticles. Young spring leaves are an attractive bronze color. The serrated leaves have a 0.8 to 1.2 cm petiole, and are obovate-oblong or broadly elliptic, from 4.5 to 12 cm long and 2.7 to 5.5 cm wide. The leaves are a darker green on the top surface, with the underside glabrous, sometimes initially pilose on the veins. Prunus cyclamina var. cyclamina, the more widely distributed variety, has subumbellate inflorescences with 3 to 4 flowers, and Prunus cyclamina var. biflora has umbellate inflorescences with two flowers. Each flower is 3 to 6 cm wide and has about 32 stamens. The form of their deep pink calyxes resembles the corollas of cyclamen flowers, inspiring the specific epithet. The fruit, a drupe, is subglobose, purplish‑red, and 7.5 to 8.3 mm in diameter with scant but tasty flesh. They are relished by birds.

== Distribution ==
Cyclamin cherry is found in Guangdong, Guangxi, Hubei, Hunan, and Sichuan provinces in China.

== Varieties ==
- Prunus cyclamina var. cyclamina
- Prunus cyclamina var. biflora (双花山樱桃)
