= Prunus trichamygdalus =

Scientific classification
- Kingdom: Plantae
- Clade: Tracheophytes
- Clade: Angiosperms
- Clade: Eudicots
- Clade: Rosids
- Order: Rosales
- Family: Rosaceae
- Genus: Prunus
- Subgenus: Prunus subg. Amygdalus
- Species: P. trichamygdalus

Binomial name
- Prunus trichamygdalus Hand.-Mazz.

Synonyms
- Amygdalus trichamygdalus (Hand.-Mazz.) Woronow

Species of tree

Prunus trichamygdalus (Persian: بادام مخملی, lit. 'velvet almond') is a putative species of "wild" almond tree native to eastern Anatolia in Turkey, and nearby areas of Iran (possibly introduced). Molecular and morphological analyses show that is very similar to Prunus dulcis, the cultivated almond, differing in its shorter petioles and smaller leaves with more numerous crenulations. Its flowers are pink, and its fruits green. Non-bitter forms may be cultivated, (Note: Some Turkish scientific articles appear to consider Amygdalus trichamygdalus to be the binomial for almond. It is worth noting that there is not a heavily-used common name in Turkish for this type of almond.) but its native range is restricted to elevations of 1250-2100 m on limestone slopes and gorges in the Lake Van area.
