= Prunus trichostoma =

Scientific classification
- Kingdom: Plantae
- Clade: Tracheophytes
- Clade: Angiosperms
- Clade: Eudicots
- Clade: Rosids
- Order: Rosales
- Family: Rosaceae
- Genus: Prunus
- Subgenus: Prunus subg. Cerasus
- Species: P. trichostoma

Binomial name
- Prunus trichostoma Koehne

Synonyms
- Cerasus trichostoma (Koehne) T.T.Yu & C.L.Li; Prunus latidentata Koehne; Prunus latidentata var. trichostoma (Koehne) C. K. Schneider; Prunus lobulata Koehne; Prunus pleuroptera Koehne

Species of tree

Prunus trichostoma (Chinese: 川西樱桃) is a species of cherry found in Tibet, Gansu, Qinghai, Sichuan and Yunnan provinces of China. A shrubby tree 2 to 10 m tall, it prefers to grow 1000 to 4000 m above sea level. It is a common member of the shrub layer.
