= Prunus subcorymbosa =

Conservation status
- Least Concern (IUCN 3.1)

Scientific classification
- Kingdom: Plantae
- Clade: Tracheophytes
- Clade: Angiosperms
- Clade: Eudicots
- Clade: Rosids
- Order: Rosales
- Family: Rosaceae
- Genus: Prunus
- Species: P. subcorymbosa

Binomial name
- Prunus subcorymbosa Ruiz ex Koehne

Synonyms
- Prunus carolinae García-Barr.

Species of tree

Prunus subcorymbosa is a species of tree in the family Rosaceae, and is native to montane forests from Costa Rica, Central America, to Venezuela and northern Peru, South America.
