= Prunus conradinae =

Scientific classification
- Kingdom: Plantae
- Clade: Tracheophytes
- Clade: Angiosperms
- Clade: Eudicots
- Clade: Rosids
- Order: Rosales
- Family: Rosaceae
- Genus: Prunus
- Subgenus: Prunus subg. Cerasus
- Section: P. sect. Cerasus
- Species: P. conradinae

Binomial name
- Prunus conradinae Koehne

Synonyms
- Cerasus conradinae (Koehne) T.T.Yu & C.L.Li; Cerasus glabra (Pamp.) T.T.Yu & C.L.Li; Prunus conradinae var. trichogyna Cardot; Prunus glabra (Pamp.) Koehne; Prunus glabra var. occultipes Koehne; Prunus helenae Koehne; Prunus hirtipes var. glabra Pamp.; Prunus occultipes (Koehne) H.Lév.; Prunus rufoides var. glabrifolia C.K.Schneid.; Prunus twymaniana Koehne

Species of tree

Prunus conradinae is a species of flowering cherry native to Fujian, Gansu, Guangxi, Guizhou, Henan, Hubei, Hunan, Shaanxi, Sichuan, Yunnan and Zhejiang provinces of China. There it prefers to grow in forested ravines and slopes at 500 to 2100 m above sea level. A small tree growing to at most 10 m, it has leaves that are lighter green on their undersides. It has fragrant, white to pale pink flowers with 32 to 54 stamens. It is planted outside its native range as an ornamental due to its habit of flowering in late winter. In warmer conditions it may even flower in early January.
