= Prunus herthae =

Conservation status
- Data Deficient (IUCN 3.1)

Scientific classification
- Kingdom: Plantae
- Clade: Tracheophytes
- Clade: Angiosperms
- Clade: Eudicots
- Clade: Rosids
- Order: Rosales
- Family: Rosaceae
- Genus: Prunus
- Species: P. herthae

Binomial name
- Prunus herthae Diels

Species of plant

Prunus herthae is a species of plant in the family Rosaceae. It is endemic to Ecuador.
