= Prunus venulosa =

Scientific classification
- Kingdom: Plantae
- Clade: Tracheophytes
- Clade: Angiosperms
- Clade: Eudicots
- Clade: Rosids
- Order: Rosales
- Family: Rosaceae
- Genus: Prunus
- Subgenus: Prunus subg. Prunus
- Section: Prunus sect. Prunocerasus
- Species: P. venulosa

Binomial name
- Prunus venulosa Sarg.

Species of flowering plant

Prunus venulosa is a putative species of Prunus. It was first found only in the Denison, Texas, area, and it strongly resembles Prunus gracilis. It is suspected to be of hybrid origin, with its parents being P. gracilis and P. rivularis.

== Description ==
A shrub 1-2 m tall, it differs from P. gracilis in having larger leaves with coarser serrations, and in having glabrous pedicels.
