= Prunus walkeri =

Conservation status
- Vulnerable (IUCN 2.3)

Scientific classification
- Kingdom: Plantae
- Clade: Tracheophytes
- Clade: Angiosperms
- Clade: Eudicots
- Clade: Rosids
- Order: Rosales
- Family: Rosaceae
- Genus: Prunus
- Species: P. walkeri

Binomial name
- Prunus walkeri (Wight) Kalkman

Synonyms
- Pygeum walkeri (Wight) Blume

Species of plant

Prunus walkeri is a species of plant in the family Rosaceae. It is endemic to Sri Lanka.
