= Prunus wilsonii =

Scientific classification
- Kingdom: Plantae
- Clade: Tracheophytes
- Clade: Angiosperms
- Clade: Eudicots
- Clade: Rosids
- Order: Rosales
- Family: Rosaceae
- Genus: Prunus
- Subgenus: Prunus subg. Padus
- Species: P. wilsonii

Binomial name
- Prunus wilsonii (Diels ex C.K.Schneid.) Koehne

Synonyms
- Padus wilsonii C.K.Schneid.; Prunus wilsonii (C.K.Schneid.) Koehne; Prunus wilsonii Diels ex Koehne; Prunus dunniana H. Lév.; Prunus rufomicans Koehne; Prunus sericea (Batalin) Koehne

Species of tree

Prunus wilsonii (Chinese: 绢毛稠李) is a species of Prunus native to southeast China, preferring to grow at 950–2500 m. It is a deciduous tree reaching a height of 10–30 m.

== Uses ==
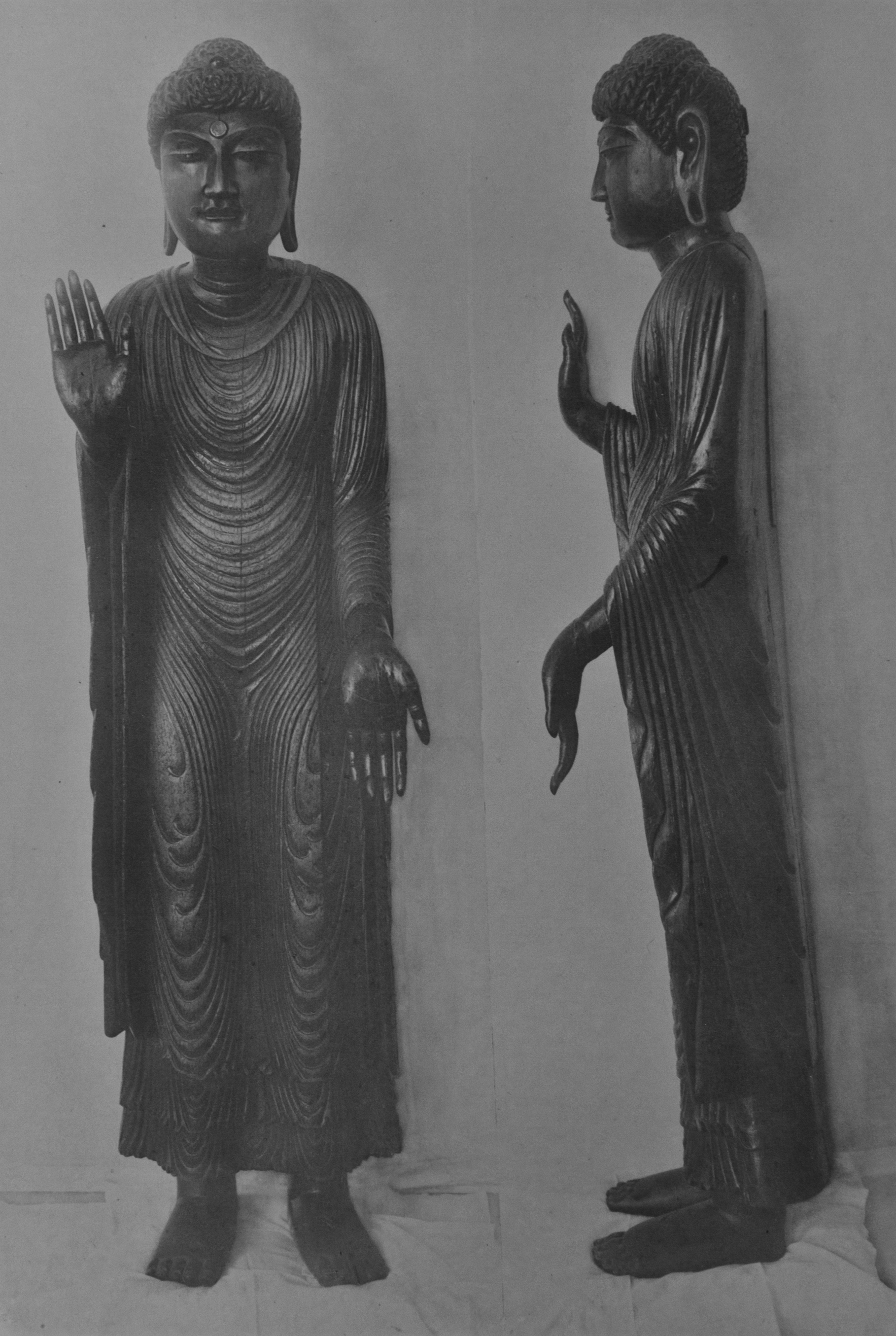
The wood is left unpainted for visual effect.

Wood from Prunus wilsonii was used to carve the Shakyamuni (Shaka Nyorai) (木造釈迦如来立像; mokuzō shaka nyorai ryūzō), a copy of the lost Udayana Buddha by the Chinese sculptors (and brothers) Zhāng Yánjiǎo and Zhāng Yánxí. It was brought to Japan from China in 986 by the monk Chōnen (奝然). The sculpture stands 160 cm (5 ft 3 in) tall and is a National Treasure of Japan.
