= Prunus × fruticans =

Scientific classification
- Kingdom: Plantae
- Clade: Tracheophytes
- Clade: Angiosperms
- Clade: Eudicots
- Clade: Rosids
- Order: Rosales
- Family: Rosaceae
- Genus: Prunus
- Species: P. × fruticans

Binomial name
- Prunus × fruticans Weihe

Synonyms
- Prunus spinosa subsp. fruticans (Weihe) Nyman

Hybrid species of tree

Prunus × fruticans (or Prunus fruticans) is a shrubby dark-fruiting Prunus of hybrid origin allied to blackthorn, bullace and damsons. Examples frequently reach about 4 m (13 ft) in height, although large tree-like forms are known.

Morphological, habitat and genetic data indicate that most or all examples of fruticans represents hybrids of blackthorn Prunus spinosa, and Prunus domestica var. insititia be it in its black bullace (var. nigra) or damson (var. damascene) forms. Prunus x fruticans is found mainly in Europe where these species ranges overlap. Analysis of some forms reveals it to be a tetraploid despite suspected parentage involving tetraploid and hexaploid species otherwise expected to produce at least some pentaploid offspring. However, earlier research that examined different morphologies in different geographical areas across Europe have identified self-fertile forms, which in the context of additional research suggests that some are pentaploid or hexaploid. Hanelt also observed pentaploid forms in Prunus x fruticans hybrids, while listing at least eight forms alleged to be subspecies of blackthorn, thereby raising issues with the visual interpretation of morphological features. Issues with interpretation of the hybrids grouped under fruticans possibly stem from the genetic variance in plants grouped under blackthorn Prunus spinosa that have shown to be diploid, triploid, pentaploid and hexaploid, despite popular scholarly references to their tetraploid status influencing a pseudo-consensus. Some large-fruited blackthorn forms have been shown to be tetraploid, and so are varieties of blackthorn such as var. macrocarpa, while the uncertain consequence of the ploidy status of some or all black bullace is absent from research that has focused on crosses of blackthorn with damson. The damson is a hexaploid grouped with the genetically uncategorised black bullace under the same subspecies category, presently as Prunus x domestica subsp. insititia. Woldring in his 1998 study noted at least 33 very diverse forms from trailing hedges to large thorny shrubs or even larger plum sized trees over 20 feet in height but bearing mostly blackthorn characteristics and a confusing absence of dominant intermediary features. These Woldring grouped under the intermediate forms, as Prunus x fruticans or in some cases more complex back crosses with blackthorn or damson, but with little reference to Bullace as a distinct contributor instead of the umbrella term 'damson' (both lumped as insititia). As such, without more precise genetic analysis, the forms of hybrid commonly grouped as Prunus x fruticans are very diverse in morphology and represent an unknown affinity to their parent species or varieties of the same, especially due to repeat hybridisation. Many popular and authoritative sources compound the problem by tending to describe Prunus x fruticans in basic terms as an intermediary large shrub with the qualities of blackthorn and domestic plums (P. domestica), despite this not being universally the case, and examples can be found in eminent works by C. Stace like the New Flora of the British Isles, which also groups the putative blackthorn subspecies macrocarpa under Prunus x fruticans despite the evidence of U. Körber-Grohne and others pointing to the ploidy characteristics of blackthorn only in this form. An issue arising from this limited research and the diversity of forms means that it is difficult to visually determine true examples of Prunus x fruticans from some forms of bullace and unusual or possibly unknown varieties of blackthorn. Moreover, some traditional forms of bullace may themselves represent forms of Prunus x fruticans, which have been able to persist due to frequent stone fecundity within these dark-fruited hybrids. That many observed forms of Prunus x fruticans in Europe are not actually hybrids but instead forms or even subspecies of blackthorn and Prunus insititia, is strongly suggested in the high number of Danish examples studied by Nielsen and Olrik, suggesting that Prunus x fruticans may be rare in Europe, and that successful identification in the field is presently impossible due to a lack of scientifically confirmed discriminating characteristics.
