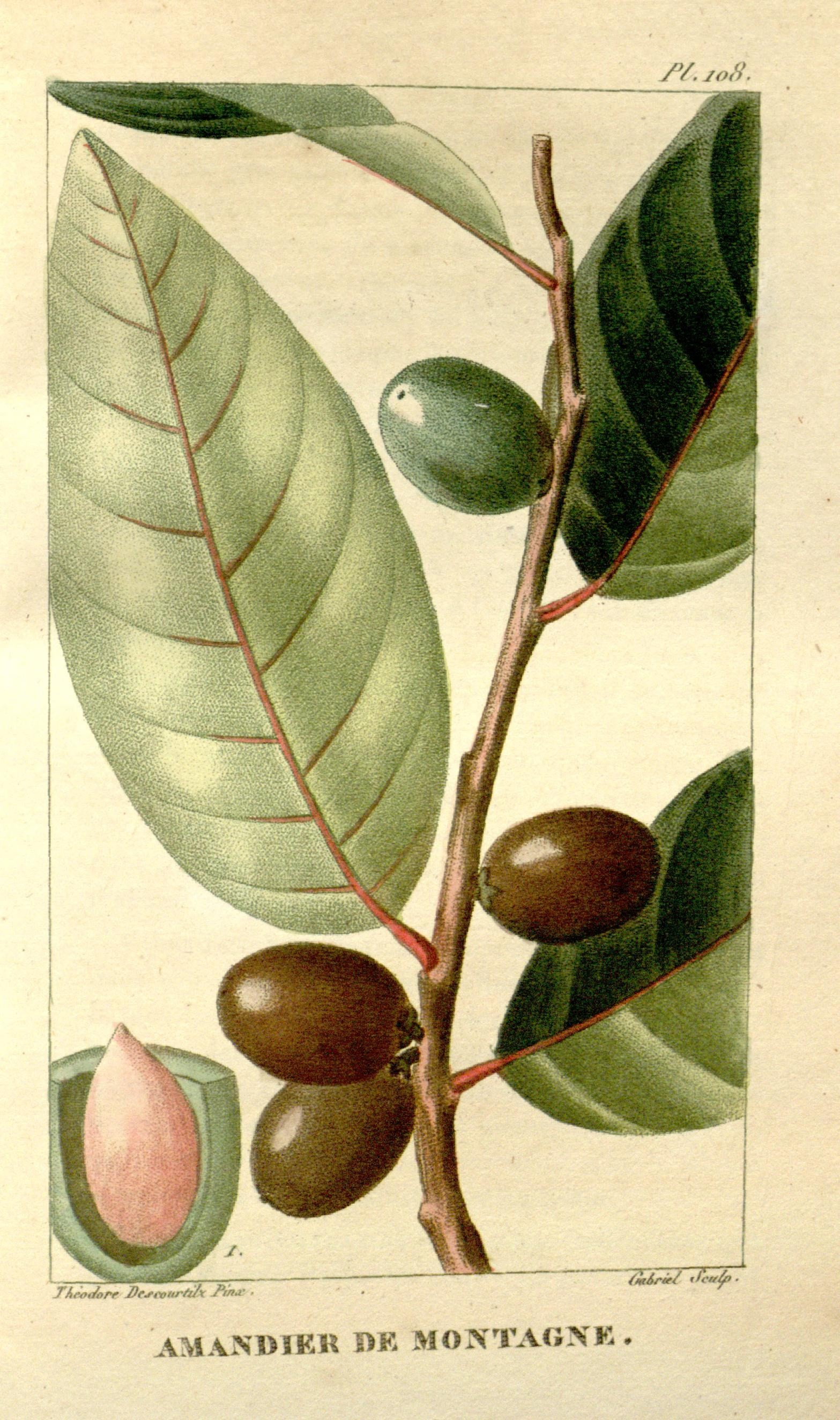
- Illustration

Scientific classification
- Kingdom: Plantae
- Clade: Tracheophytes
- Clade: Angiosperms
- Clade: Eudicots
- Clade: Rosids
- Order: Rosales
- Family: Rosaceae
- Genus: Prunus
- Subgenus: Prunus subg. Padus
- Species: P. pleuradenia

Binomial name
- Prunus pleuradenia Griseb.

Synonyms
- Prunus acutissima Urb. Prunus dussii Krug & Urb. ex Duss

= Prunus pleuradenia =

Species of tree

Prunus pleuradenia, the Antilles cherry, is a species of cherry laurel (Laurocerasus, sometimes included in Padus) native to the islands of the Caribbean, particularly the Lesser Antilles. It may also be native to Venezuela. Individuals are small to medium-sized trees, reaching 15 metres (49 feet). Some authorities consider it a synonym of Prunus myrtifolia.
