= Prunus discolor =

Conservation status
- Data Deficient (IUCN 3.1)

Scientific classification
- Kingdom: Plantae
- Clade: Tracheophytes
- Clade: Angiosperms
- Clade: Eudicots
- Clade: Rosids
- Order: Rosales
- Family: Rosaceae
- Genus: Prunus
- Species: P. discolor

Binomial name
- Prunus discolor (Spach) C.K.Schneid.

Synonyms
- Amygdalus discolor (Spach) M.Roem.; Amygdalus graeca Lindl.; Amygdalus orientalis var. discolor Spach; Prunus graeca (Lindl.) Eisenman; Prunus lindleyi Eisenman

Species of plant in the rose family

Prunus discolor is a species of flowering plant in the family Rosaceae, native to the eastern Aegean Islands, Turkey, and Syria. A shrub, it is found in Quercus-dominated scrublands and rocky hillsides, typically on limestone soils. It is easily distinguished from all other Prunus species by its leaves, which are densely silvery-white tomentose on their abaxial (under) sides, and dark green and glabrous on the adaxial (upper) sides.
