= Prunus cerasia =

Scientific classification
- Kingdom: Plantae
- Clade: Tracheophytes
- Clade: Angiosperms
- Clade: Eudicots
- Clade: Rosids
- Order: Rosales
- Family: Rosaceae
- Genus: Prunus
- Species: P. cerasia

Binomial name
- Prunus cerasia Blanche ex Post

Species of plant in the rose family

Prunus cerasia is a species of flowering plant in the family Rosaceae, native to Lebanon and Syria. It is hexaploid that has been characterized as either a landrace or a wild species of plum.
