= Prunus × arnoldiana =

Scientific classification
- Kingdom: Plantae
- Clade: Tracheophytes
- Clade: Angiosperms
- Clade: Eudicots
- Clade: Rosids
- Order: Rosales
- Family: Rosaceae
- Genus: Prunus
- Species: P. × arnoldiana

Binomial name
- Prunus × arnoldiana Rehder

Species of flowering plant

Prunus × arnoldiana is a hybrid species of Prunus discovered growing on the grounds of the Arnold Arboretum of Harvard University. It is a cross of flowering plum, Prunus triloba, and cherry plum, Prunus cerasifera. One of its parents was initially thought to be Prunus tomentosa. It differs from P. triloba in a number of features, the most important being having more copious white flowers. P. triloba flowers are usually pink. Likewise, it differs from P. cerasifera in a number of features, the most important being its more compact, shrubby growth form.
