= Prunus sunhangii =

Conservation status
- Endangered (IUCN 3.1)

Scientific classification
- Kingdom: Plantae
- Clade: Tracheophytes
- Clade: Angiosperms
- Clade: Eudicots
- Clade: Rosids
- Order: Rosales
- Family: Rosaceae
- Genus: Prunus
- Subgenus: Prunus subg. Cerasus
- Species: P. sunhangii

Binomial name
- Prunus sunhangii D.G.Zhang & T.Deng

Species of cherry

Prunus sunhangii is a species of cherry native to Hunan and Hubei provinces, China. It grows only on limestone slopes in the Wuling Mountains, 300 to 1200 m above sea level. It is similar to Prunus cerasoides but is genetically and morphologically distinct. It has been given the nominal common name Sun Hang cherry (Chinese: 孙航樱) in honor of the botanist Hang Sun.

== Description ==
Prunus sunhangii are trees 20 to 25 m tall. They resemble P. cerasoides but can be distinguished from them by a number of features. P. sunhangii leaf margins are apex acuminate whereas P. cerasoides leaf margins are apex acuminate to long acuminate. P. sunhangii sepal margins are laxly dentate but P. cerasoides sepals are entire. P. sunhangii petals are longitudinally 2‑lobed while P. cerasoides petals are emarginate. P. sunhangii flowers have 17 to 25 stamens and P. cerasoides flowers have 32 to 34 stamens.

There are color differences; all P. sunhangii individuals observed have white petals, but some P. cerasoides have pink petals (others have white). P. sunhangii hypanthia are brown, P. cerasoides hypanthia are red through dark red. P. sunhangii drupes are black when ripe, P. cerasoides drupes are purplish‑black.

== Distribution ==
Prunus sunhangii has a disjunct distribution from P. cerasoides. P. sunhangii is found only in association with the relict stands of Metasequoia glyptostroboides of Hunan and Hubei provinces but the more widely distributed P. cerasoides is never found there. The area of occupancy of P. sunhangii is only about 75 km^{2}, so it should be considered endangered under the rules of the IUCN.
