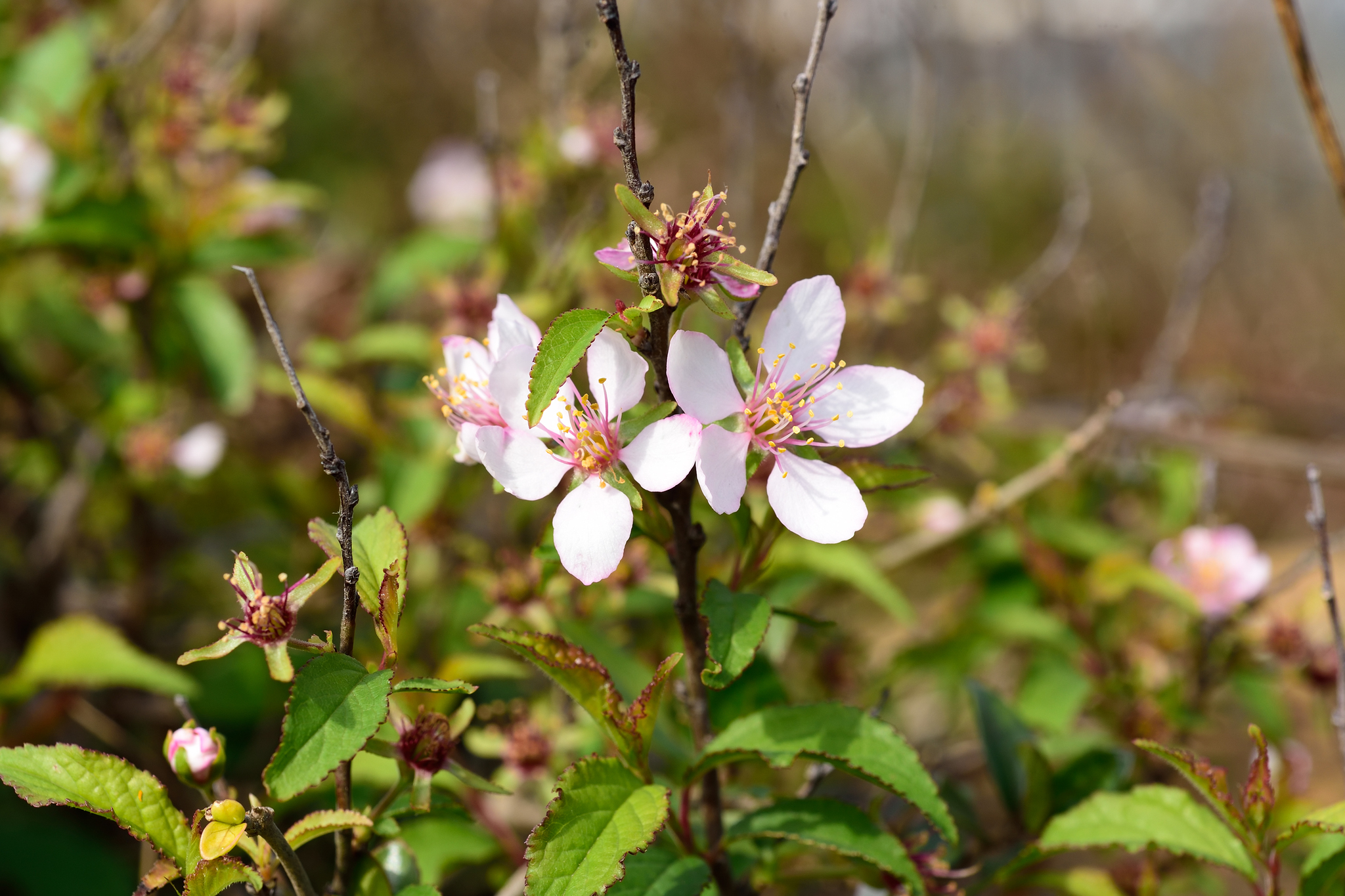

Scientific classification
- Kingdom: Plantae
- Clade: Tracheophytes
- Clade: Angiosperms
- Clade: Eudicots
- Clade: Rosids
- Order: Rosales
- Family: Rosaceae
- Genus: Prunus
- Subgenus: Prunus subg. Prunus
- Section: Prunus sect. Microcerasus
- Species: P. pogonostyla

Binomial name
- Prunus pogonostyla Maxim.

Synonyms
- List: Celtis caudata Hance; Cerasus caudata Masam. & S.Suzuki; Cerasus pogonostyla (Maxim.) T.T.Yu & C.L.Li; Cerasus pogonostyla var. obovata (Koehne) T.T.Yu & C.L.Li; Microcerasus glandulosa f. pogonostyla (Maxim.) Eremin & Yushev; Prunus caudata (Hance) Koidz.; Prunus caudata var. obovata (Koehne) F.P.Metcalf; Prunus formosana Matsum.

= Prunus pogonostyla =

Species of plant

Prunus pogonostyla, the hairy-style cherry, is a species of flowering plant in the family Rosaceae, native to Manchuria, southeastern China, and Taiwan. A shrub or tree reaching 1.5 m (5 ft), with pink flowers, it is typically found growing on forested hillsides from 300 to 800 m (1,000 to 2,600 ft).

== Subtaxa ==
The following subtaxa are accepted:

- Prunus pogonostyla var. obovata Koehne – entire range
- Prunus pogonostyla var. pogonostyla – southeastern China, Taiwan
