= Prunus pygeoides =

Scientific classification
- Kingdom: Plantae
- Clade: Tracheophytes
- Clade: Angiosperms
- Clade: Eudicots
- Clade: Rosids
- Order: Rosales
- Family: Rosaceae
- Genus: Prunus
- Subgenus: Prunus subg. Cerasus
- Section: P. sect. Laurocerasus
- Species: P. pygeoides

Binomial name
- Prunus pygeoides Koehne

Synonyms
- Laurocerasus andersonii (Hook.f.) T.T.Yu & L.T.Lu; Lauro-cerasus andersonii (Hook.f.) T.T.Yu & L.T.Lu; Laurocerasus pygeoides (Koehne) Browicz; Lauro-cerasus pygeoides (Koehne) Browicz; Prunus semiarmillata Koehne; Prunus semi-armillata Koehne; Pygeum andersonii Hook.f.; Pygeum lucidum T.Anderson ex Prain, nom.illegit.; Pygeum lucidum T.Anderson, nom.nud.; Pygeum mooneyi Raiz.

Species of flowering plant

Prunus pygeoides, (Chinese: 云南桂樱 "Yunnan cherry laurel"), is a species of Prunus native to India and China, preferring to grow at 900–1500 m. It is typically a tree reaching 6-10 m tall. It is rare in India.
