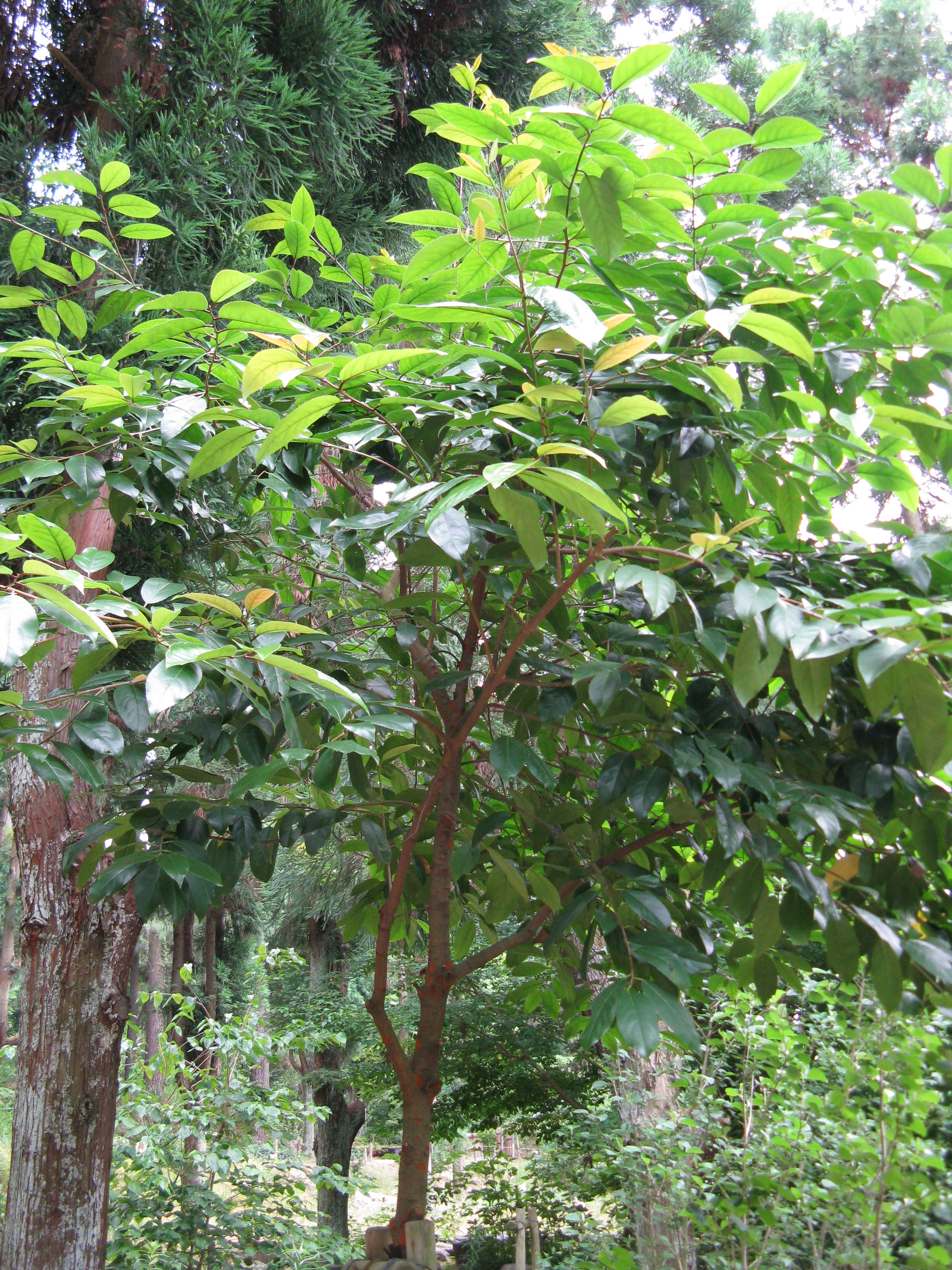

Scientific classification
- Kingdom: Plantae
- Clade: Tracheophytes
- Clade: Angiosperms
- Clade: Eudicots
- Clade: Rosids
- Order: Rosales
- Family: Rosaceae
- Genus: Prunus
- Species: P. zippeliana

Binomial name
- Prunus zippeliana Miq.

Synonyms
- Laurocerasus zippeliana; Prunus macrophylla Siebold & Zucc.; Prunus kanehirae Hayata ex Hisauti; Prunus kanehirai Hayata ex Hisauti; Prunus oxycarpa (Hance) Maxim.; Prunus bakti Hisauchi; Prunus nicotianifolia Loisel. ex Steud.; Pygeum oxycarpum Hance.

= Prunus zippeliana =

Species of plant

Prunus zippeliana or big leaf cherry (Chinese: 大叶桂樱, Da ye gui ying) is a species of Prunus native to China, Japan, and Vietnam. Individuals have been found in Thailand. It prefers to grow in mixed forests and thickets on calcareous mountains 400 to 2,400 metres (1,300 to 7,900 ft) above sea level. In a 1994 study, P. zippeliana was found to be the best in the genus Prunus at preventing melanin synthesis. It is an important winter host plant for Asphondylia yushimai, the soybean pod gall midge, which is a major pest of soybeans in Japan.
