= Prunus adenopoda =

Conservation status
- Endangered (IUCN 2.3)

Scientific classification
- Kingdom: Plantae
- Clade: Tracheophytes
- Clade: Angiosperms
- Clade: Eudicots
- Clade: Rosids
- Order: Rosales
- Family: Rosaceae
- Genus: Prunus
- Species: P. adenopoda

Binomial name
- Prunus adenopoda Koord. & Valeton

Synonyms
- Prunus pseudoadenopoda Koord.

Species of tree

Prunus adenopoda, known locally as ki beusi is a species of plant in the family Rosaceae. It is a tree endemic to Java in Indonesia. It is an endangered species threatened by habitat loss.
