= Prunus brasiliensis =

Conservation status
- Least Concern (IUCN 3.1)

Scientific classification
- Kingdom: Plantae
- Clade: Embryophytes
- Clade: Tracheophytes
- Clade: Angiosperms
- Clade: Eudicots
- Clade: Rosids
- Order: Rosales
- Family: Rosaceae
- Genus: Prunus
- Species: P. brasiliensis

Binomial name
- Prunus brasiliensis (Cham. & Schltdl.) D. Dietr.

Synonyms
- Cerasus brasiliensis Cham. & Schltdl.; Laurocerasus brasiliensis (Cham. & Schltdl.) M.Roem.; Prunus sphaerocarpa Hook.f.

Species of tree

Prunus brasiliensis is a South American species of tree in the rose family.

== Description ==
Prunus brasiliensis forms a tree up to 20 metres (66 feet) tall and 50 centimetres (20 inches) diameter at breast height, with a straight or slightly irregular trunk.

Small white flowers are arranged in axillary racemes 2–10 cm (3/4–4 in) long. The petals are up to 15 millimetres (5/8 in) long.

== Distribution and habitat ==
The species is native to Brazil and northern Argentina in forests up to 500 m (1,600 ft) in elevation.
