= Prunus polystachya =

Conservation status
- Least Concern (IUCN 2.3)

Scientific classification
- Kingdom: Plantae
- Clade: Tracheophytes
- Clade: Angiosperms
- Clade: Eudicots
- Clade: Rosids
- Order: Rosales
- Family: Rosaceae
- Genus: Prunus
- Species: P. polystachya

Binomial name
- Prunus polystachya (Hook.f.) Kalkman

Synonyms
- Pygeum polystachyum Hook. fil.

Species of plant

Prunus polystachya, also called bat laurel, is a species of plant in the family Rosaceae. It is endemic to Singapore.

== Appearance ==
Prunus polystachya can grow up to 35 metres (115 ft) and the bole can grow to 60cm in diameter.
