= Prunus subglabra =

Conservation status
- Endangered (IUCN 3.1)

Scientific classification
- Kingdom: Plantae
- Clade: Tracheophytes
- Clade: Angiosperms
- Clade: Eudicots
- Clade: Rosids
- Order: Rosales
- Family: Rosaceae
- Genus: Prunus
- Species: P. subglabra

Binomial name
- Prunus subglabra (Merr.) Kalkman

Synonyms
- Pygeum subglabrum Merr.

Species of flowering plant

Prunus subglabra is a species of plant in the family Rosaceae. It is endemic to the Philippines.
