= Prunus glabrifolia =

Scientific classification
- Kingdom: Plantae
- Clade: Tracheophytes
- Clade: Angiosperms
- Clade: Eudicots
- Clade: Rosids
- Order: Rosales
- Family: Rosaceae
- Genus: Prunus
- Species: P. glabrifolia

Binomial name
- Prunus glabrifolia Kalkman

Synonyms
- Pygeum brevifolium Hook.f.; Pygeum scortechinii King

Species of tree

Prunus glabrifolia is a species of Prunus native to Malaya, Sumatra and Sarawak. It is a shrub or small tree reaching 15 m. It is morphologically somewhat similar to Prunus grisea var. tomentosa, but can be easily distinguished by its much stiffer leaves.
