= Prunus jenkinsii =

Scientific classification
- Kingdom: Plantae
- Clade: Tracheophytes
- Clade: Angiosperms
- Clade: Eudicots
- Clade: Rosids
- Order: Rosales
- Family: Rosaceae
- Genus: Prunus
- Species: P. jenkinsii

Binomial name
- Prunus jenkinsii Hook.f. & Thomson

Synonyms
- Laurocerasus jenkinsii (Hook.f. & Thomson) Browicz; Lauro-cerasus jenkinsii (Hook.f. & Thomson) T.T. Yu & L.T. Lu; Cerasus jenkinsii (Hook.) H.Ohle

Species of plant

Prunus jenkinsii, called thereju and bonthereju, (Chinese: 坚核桂樱), is a species of Prunus native to the foothills of the Himalayas, preferring to grow at 1000–1800 m. It is a tree typically 7–20 m tall, flowering in autumn and fruiting in winter and spring. Its hard but edible dark brown fruit is harvested and brought to market in areas of India where it grows. Some sources even consider it to be cultivated or semidomesticated.
