= Prunus setulosa =

Scientific classification
- Kingdom: Plantae
- Clade: Tracheophytes
- Clade: Angiosperms
- Clade: Eudicots
- Clade: Rosids
- Order: Rosales
- Family: Rosaceae
- Genus: Prunus
- Subgenus: Prunus subg. Cerasus
- Species: P. setulosa

Binomial name
- Prunus setulosa Batalin

Synonyms
- Cerasus setulosa (Batalin) T.T.Yu & C.L.Li; Prunus gracilifolia Koehne

Species of tree

Prunus setulosa (Chinese: 刺毛樱桃, bristle cherry) is a species of cherry found in Gansu, Guizhou, Hubei, Ningxia, Qinghai, Shaanxi and Sichuan provinces of China. A shrub or small tree 1.5 to 5 m tall, it prefers to grow in forests or thickets in mountain ravines between 1300 and 2,600 m above sea level. Its leaves are eaten by the gray snub-nosed monkey Rhinopithecus brelichi. Its inflorescences are umbels with two or three flowers. The sepals are leaf-like, and the petals are pink. There are 30 to 40 stamens. It blooms April through June and bears red fruits June through August.
