= Prunus subcoriacea =

Scientific classification
- Kingdom: Plantae
- Clade: Tracheophytes
- Clade: Angiosperms
- Clade: Eudicots
- Clade: Rosids
- Order: Rosales
- Family: Rosaceae
- Genus: Prunus
- Species: P. subcoriacea

Binomial name
- Prunus subcoriacea (Chodat & Hassl.) Koehne

Species of tree

Prunus subcoriacea is a species of tree in the family Rosaceae native to South America.

== Description ==
P. subcoriacea is a tree up to twelve metres (39 ft) tall, with a rounded crown. Its flowers are white or yellowish, arranged in axillary racemes up to five centimetres (2.0 in) long.

== Distribution and habitat ==
P. subcoriacea occurs in Brazil, Uruguay, Argentina and Paraguay in forests and along watercourses up to 1,800 metres (5,900 ft) of elevation.
