= Prunus fragrans =

Scientific classification
- Kingdom: Plantae
- Clade: Tracheophytes
- Clade: Angiosperms
- Clade: Eudicots
- Clade: Rosids
- Order: Rosales
- Family: Rosaceae
- Genus: Prunus
- Species: P. fragrans

Binomial name
- Prunus fragrans (Elmer) Kalkman

Synonyms
- Pygeum fragrans Elmer; Parinarium coccineum Elmer; Pygeum coccineum (Elmer) Elmer; Pygeum megaphyllum Merr.

Species of plant

Prunus fragrans, bugohansol, is a species of Prunus native to the Philippines and Taiwan, and nearby Orchid Island also known as Botel Tobago Island. It is a small tree reaching 15 m, although originally described as reaching 30 m.
