= Prunus obtusata =

Scientific classification
- Kingdom: Plantae
- Clade: Tracheophytes
- Clade: Angiosperms
- Clade: Eudicots
- Clade: Rosids
- Order: Rosales
- Family: Rosaceae
- Genus: Prunus
- Subgenus: Prunus subg. Padus
- Species: P. obtusata

Binomial name
- Prunus obtusata Koehne

Synonyms
- Padus obtusata (Koehne) T.T.Yu & T.C.Ku; Padus brachypoda var. pubigera C.K.Schneid.; Padus vaniotii H.Lév.; Padus vaniotii var. obovata (Koehne) Rehder; Prunus bicolor Koehne; Prunus ohwii Kaneh. & Hatus.; Prunus pubigera (C.K.Schneid.) Koehne; Prunus pubigera var. longifolia Cardot; Prunus pubigera var. obovata Koehne; Prunus pubigera var. ohwii (Kaneh. & Hatus. ex Kaneh.) S.S.Ying; Prunus pubigera var. potaninii (Koehne) Rehder.; Prunus pubigera var. prattii Koehne; Prunus vaniotii H.Lév.; Prunus vaniotii var. obovata (Koehne) Rehder; Prunus vaniotii var. potaninii (Koehne) Rehder

Species of tree

Prunus obtusata (Chinese: 细齿稠李, 台灣稠李) is a species of bird cherry native to Tibet, southern China and Taiwan, preferring to grow at 800–3600 m. It is a tree typically 6–20 m tall. Its flowers are borne on a raceme, with white petals. The fruit is black.

== Ecology ==
Its young leaves are consumed by the endangered Guizhou snub-nosed monkey, Rhinopithecus brelichi.
