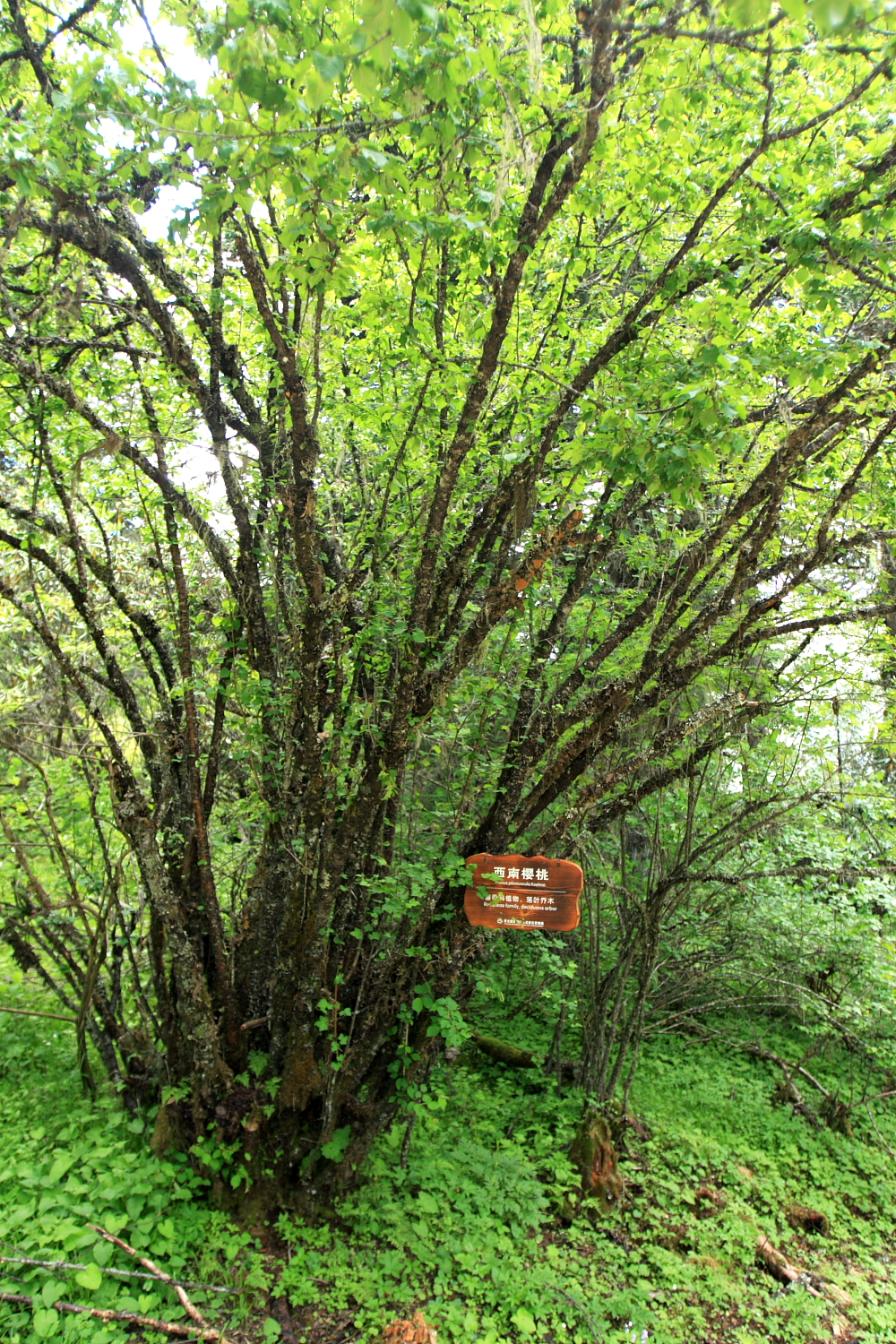
- Here labeled as "西南樱桃". (Note: 西南樱桃 seems to most often refer to Cerasus duclouxii.)

Scientific classification
- Kingdom: Plantae
- Clade: Tracheophytes
- Clade: Angiosperms
- Clade: Eudicots
- Clade: Rosids
- Order: Rosales
- Family: Rosaceae
- Genus: Prunus
- Subgenus: Prunus subg. Padus
- Species: P. yunnanensis

Binomial name
- Prunus yunnanensis Franch.

Synonyms
- Cerasus yunnanensis (Franch.) T.T.Yu & C.L.Li; Cerasus duclouxii (Koehne) T.T.Yu & C.L.Li; Prunus duclouxii Koehne; Prunus hirtifolia Koehne

= Prunus yunnanensis =

Species of tree

Prunus yunnanensis, the Yunnan cherry (Chinese: 云南樱桃) is a species of Prunus native to Yunnan, Guangxi, Sichuan and adjacent provinces of southeast China, preferring to grow at 1900–2600 m. The white flowers open at the same time as the leaves bud out, or very slightly before. It flowers from March to May, and fruits two months after.

== Description ==
It is an often many-stemmed tree, usually 4 to 8 m tall, but ranging from 3 to 9 m. Its bark is gray, with brownish‑gray branchlets and green young twigs. The leaves have a 6 to 12 mm petiole, and are elliptic, oblong, obovate‑oblong or ovate‑oblong, from 3.5 to 6 cm long and 2 to 3.5 cm wide. The leaves are a darker green on the top surface. Typically the inflorescences have 3 to 9 flowers borne on subcorymbose racemes or long racemes. Each flower has 33–45 stamens. The fruit, a drupe, is purplish red, 7 to 10 mm by 5 to 8 mm.

== Uses ==
It is planted as an ornamental street tree in Kunming, the capital of Yunnan.
