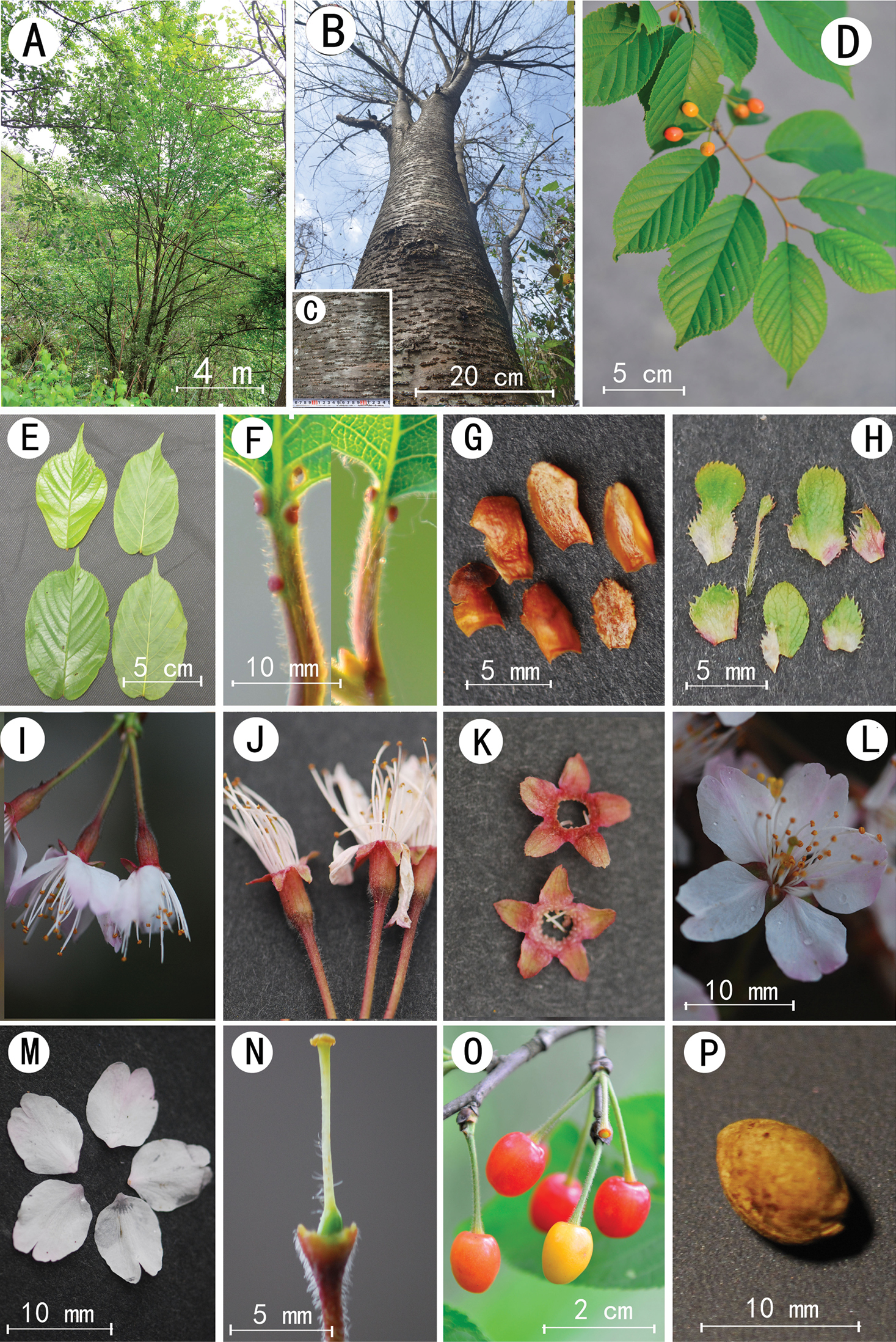
- A. crown B. trunk C. bark D. fruiting branches E. leaf blades F. petioles and glands G. internal bud scales H. involucres and bracts I. inflorescence J. pedicels and hypanthia K. calyces L. corolla M. petals N. ovary and style O. fruits P. seed

Scientific classification
- Kingdom: Plantae
- Clade: Tracheophytes
- Clade: Angiosperms
- Clade: Eudicots
- Clade: Rosids
- Order: Rosales
- Family: Rosaceae
- Genus: Prunus
- Species: P. wangii

Binomial name
- Prunus wangii Q.L.Gan, Z.Y.Li & S.Z.Xu

= Prunus wangii =

Species of plant in the rose family

Prunus wangii is a species of wild cherry in the family Rosaceae, native to Hubei province in China. Found in only two towns, there are only about 20 individuals in existence, provisionally rating them Critically Endangered.

A tree reaching 21 m (70 ft), it flowers in late February, with petals starting out pink and fading to white. Cherry species rarely bloom this early, and combined with the fading habit they show good potential for breeding with other ornamental cherries. The fruit is collected and eaten by local people, and is sweet to slightly bitter.
