= Prunus verrucosa =

Scientific classification
- Kingdom: Plantae
- Clade: Tracheophytes
- Clade: Angiosperms
- Clade: Eudicots
- Clade: Rosids
- Order: Rosales
- Family: Rosaceae
- Genus: Prunus
- Species: P. verrucosa

Binomial name
- Prunus verrucosa Franch.

Synonyms
- Cerasus verrucosa (Franch.) Nevski; Cerasus amygdaliflora Nevski; Cerasus karabastaviensis Vass.; Cerasus tadshikistanica Vassilcz.

Species of plant

Prunus verrucosa, called the warty cherry or rough-stoned cherry, is a species of cherry native to Central Asia, particularly Turkestan.

== Description ==
Prunus verrucosa is a shrub reaching 1.5–2 metres (5–7 ft). The bark is grey, turning browner with age. The flowers are pink, and the dark red fruits, although small, are palatable when consumed fresh.
