= Prunus undulata =

Conservation status
- Least Concern (IUCN 3.1)

Scientific classification
- Kingdom: Plantae
- Clade: Tracheophytes
- Clade: Angiosperms
- Clade: Eudicots
- Clade: Rosids
- Order: Rosales
- Family: Rosaceae
- Genus: Prunus
- Species: P. undulata

Binomial name
- Prunus undulata Buch.-Ham. ex D.Don

Synonyms
- Cerasus acuminata Wall.; Cerasus adenophylla M.Roem.; Cerasus capricida Wall.; Cerasus integerrima Wall.; Cerasus undulata (Buch.-Ham. ex D.Don) Ser.; Cerasus wallichii (Steud.) M.Roem.; Laurocerasus acuminata (Wall.) M.Roem.; Laurocerasus microbotrys (Koehne) Kovalev; Lauro-cerasus undulata (Buch.-Ham. ex D.Don) M.Roem.; Laurocerasus undulata (Buch.-Ham. ex D.Don) M.Roem.; Laurocerasus undulata f. elongata (Koehne) T.T.Yu & L.T.Lu; Laurocerasus undulata f. microbotrys (Koehne) T.T.Yu & L.T.Lu; Laurocerasus undulata f. pubigera T.T.Yu & L.T.Lu; Laurocerasus wallichii (Steud.) Browicz; Prunus acuminata (Wall.) D.Dietr.; Prunus acuminata f. confusa Koehne; Prunus acuminata f. elongata Koehne; Prunus acuminata f. microbotrys (Koehne) Koehne; Prunus acuminata f. vulgaris Koehne; Prunus acuminata f. wallichii Koehne; Prunus acuminata Hook.f.; Prunus adenophylla Wall.; Prunus adenophylla Wall. ex Steud.; Prunus capricida Wall.; Prunus integerrima Steud.; Prunus microbotrys Koehne; Prunus microbotrys var. obovata S.Y.Hu; Prunus undulata f. microbotrys (Koehne) Q.H.Chen; Prunus undulata f. microbotrys (Koehne) W.C.Chen; Prunus wallichii Steud.; Prunus wallichii var. crenulata F.P.Metcalf

Species of flowering plant

Prunus undulata, which goes by a number of common names including Chinese: 尖叶桂樱, lekh arupate and theiarlung, is a species of laurel cherry native to southeast Asia, including Nepal, Bhutan, Sikkim, Bangladesh, northeastern India, Myanmar, southeastern China, Aceh in Indonesia, Laos, Thailand and Vietnam. A tree reaching 16 m, prefers to grow alongside streams at 500 to 3600 m above sea level. A widespread and successful species, it has been repeatedly described, resulting in a plethora of synonyms. Of these, the specific epithet capricida refers to its legendary ability to poison goats who consume it.
