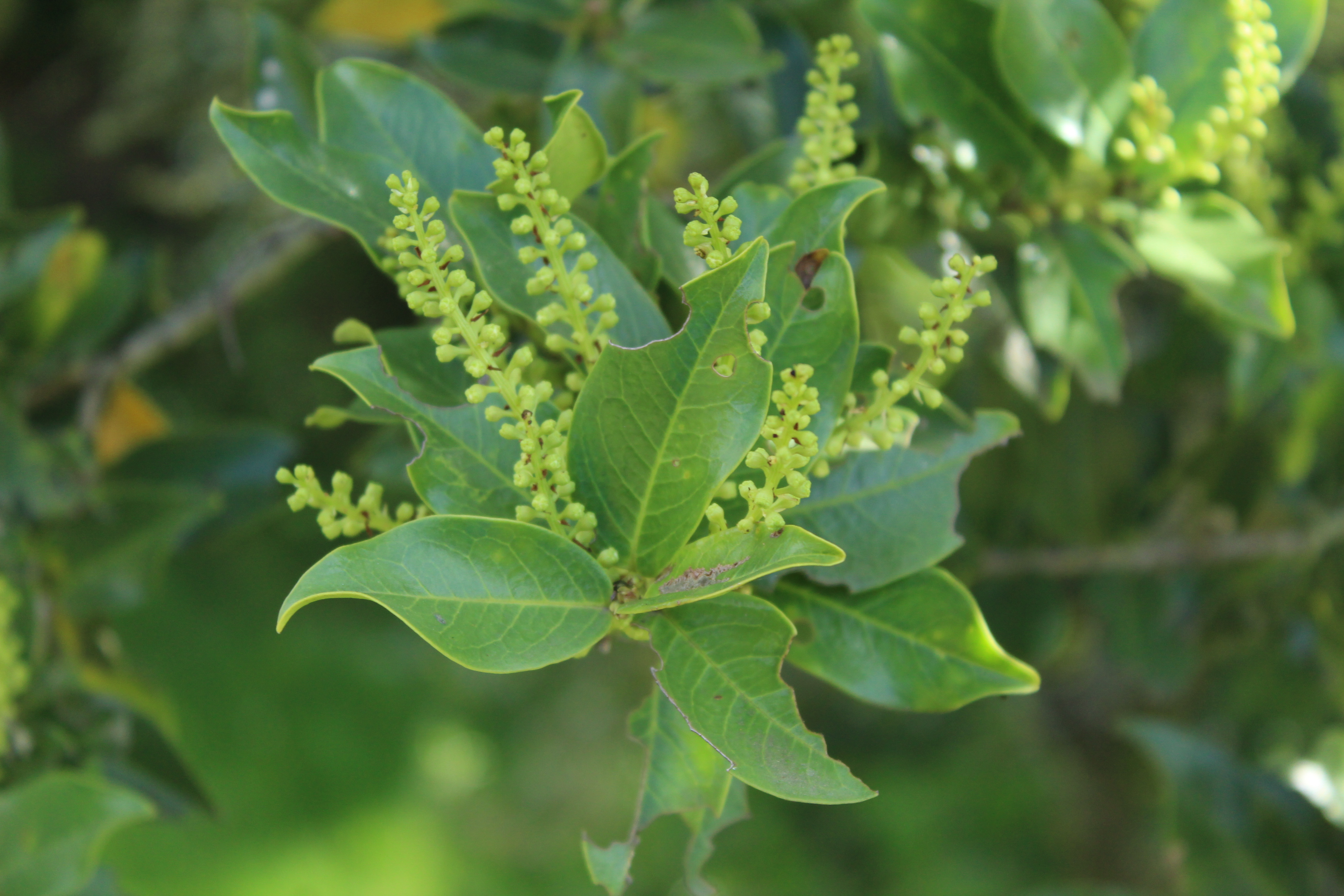

Conservation status
- Near Threatened (IUCN 3.1)

Scientific classification
- Kingdom: Plantae
- Clade: Tracheophytes
- Clade: Angiosperms
- Clade: Eudicots
- Clade: Rosids
- Order: Rosales
- Family: Rosaceae
- Genus: Prunus
- Species: P. buxifolia

Binomial name
- Prunus buxifolia Koehne

Synonyms
- Prunus betancurii Schult. & García-Barr

= Prunus buxifolia =

Species of tree

Prunus buxifolia is a species of tree in the family Rosaceae. It is endemic to Colombia, where it is called chuwacá.

== Distribution and habitat ==
Prunus buxifolia is native to the montane forests of the eastern Colombian Andes, between 2,500 and 3,650 metres (8,200 and 11,980 feet) of elevation.
