= Prunus × mohacsyana =

Scientific classification
- Kingdom: Plantae
- Clade: Tracheophytes
- Clade: Angiosperms
- Clade: Eudicots
- Clade: Rosids
- Order: Rosales
- Family: Rosaceae
- Genus: Prunus
- Subgenus: Prunus subg. Cerasus
- Species: P. × mohacsyana

Binomial name
- Prunus × mohacsyana Kárpáti

Synonyms
- Cerasus × mohacsyana (Kárpáti) Janch.

Hybrid species of cherry

Prunus × mohacsyana (or Prunus mohacsyana) is a hybrid species of cherry. It is a naturally occurring offspring of dwarf cherry, Prunus fruticosa, and introduced sweet cherry, Prunus avium, found where their ranges overlap in Central Europe. Since the hybrids are triploid, they are probably sterile. It was first formally described in 1944 by Zoltán Kárpáti.
