= Prunus pusilliflora =

Scientific classification
- Kingdom: Plantae
- Clade: Tracheophytes
- Clade: Angiosperms
- Clade: Eudicots
- Clade: Rosids
- Order: Rosales
- Family: Rosaceae
- Genus: Prunus
- Species: P. pusilliflora

Binomial name
- Prunus pusilliflora Cardot

Synonyms
- Cerasus pusilliflora (Cardot) T.T.Yu & C.L.Li

Species of plant

Prunus pusilliflora (syn. Cerasus pusilliflora), is a species of flowering plant in the family Rosaceae. It is native to Yunnan in China, where it is widespread, and is sometimes cultivated. A shrub or small tree reaching 3 to 10 m (10 to 33 ft), it is typically found in forested mountain slopes and ravines, at elevations from 1,400 to 2,100 m (4,600 to 6,900 ft). A chromosome-scale genome assembly study showed that it has better resistance to Colletotrichum viniferum, Phytophthora capsici, and Pseudomonas syringae pv. tomato than does Prunus avium, sweet cherry.
