= Prunus clarofolia =

Scientific classification
- Kingdom: Plantae
- Clade: Tracheophytes
- Clade: Angiosperms
- Clade: Eudicots
- Clade: Rosids
- Order: Rosales
- Family: Rosaceae
- Genus: Prunus
- Subgenus: Prunus subg. Cerasus
- Species: P. clarofolia

Binomial name
- Prunus clarofolia C.K.Schneid.

Synonyms
- Cerasus clarofolia (C.K.Schneid.) T.T.Yu & C.L.Li; Prunus litigiosa Bean; Prunus litigiosa C.K.Schneid.; Prunus litigiosa var. abbreviata Koehne; Prunus pilosiuscula (C.K.Schneid.) Koehne; Prunus pilosiuscula (Koehne) Koehne; Prunus pilosiuscula var. barbata Koehne; Prunus pilosiuscula var. media Koehne; Prunus pilosiuscula var. subvestita Koehne; Prunus tatsienensis var. pilosiuscula C.K.Schneid.; Prunus venusta Koehne; Prunus rehderiana Koehne; Prunus sprengeri Pamp.; Prunus variabilis Koehne nom. illeg., non P. variabilis Newb. 1882

Species of tree

Prunus clarofolia (shiny-leaf cherry) is a species of cherry found in Anhui, Gansu, Guizhou, Hebei, Henan, Hubei, Hunan, Ningxia, Shaanxi, Shanxi, Sichuan, Tibet, Yunnan and Zhejiang provinces of China. A shrubby tree 2.5 to 20 m tall, it prefers to grow on mountain slopes between 800 and 3,600 m above sea level. As Prunus litigiosa it is called the tassel cherry and sold as an ornamental for its interesting flowers and columnar form.
