= Prunus tetradenia =

Scientific classification
- Kingdom: Plantae
- Clade: Tracheophytes
- Clade: Angiosperms
- Clade: Eudicots
- Clade: Rosids
- Order: Rosales
- Family: Rosaceae
- Genus: Prunus
- Species: P. tetradenia

Binomial name
- Prunus tetradenia Koehne

Species of tree

Prunus tetradenia is a species of Prunus native to the montane cloud forests of Mexico. It is a tree 6 to 20 m tall. The resplendent quetzal consumes its fruit.
