= Prunus kalkmanii =

Conservation status
- Endangered (IUCN 3.1)

Scientific classification
- Kingdom: Plantae
- Clade: Tracheophytes
- Clade: Angiosperms
- Clade: Eudicots
- Clade: Rosids
- Order: Rosales
- Family: Rosaceae
- Genus: Prunus
- Species: P. kalkmanii

Binomial name
- Prunus kalkmanii Idrees & J.M.H.Shaw

Synonyms
- Prunus mirabilis Kalkman, nom. illeg. hom.

Species of tree

Prunus kalkmanii is a species of plant in the family Rosaceae. It is a tree endemic to Borneo where it is confined to Sabah.

Prunus kalkmanii is a tree which grows up to 12 metres tall.

It is known only from Mount Kinabalu and Sungai Kalang in the Crocker Range. It grows in lower and upper montane rain forest from 1,085 to 3,353 metres elevation.

== Taxonomy ==
The species was first described in 1965 by Cornelis Kalkman as Prunus mirabilis. The holotype is Chew, Corner & Stainton 1097, in the Kew Herbarium. This name proved to be an illegitimate later homonym, and the replacement name Prunus kalkmanii was published for it in 2024.
