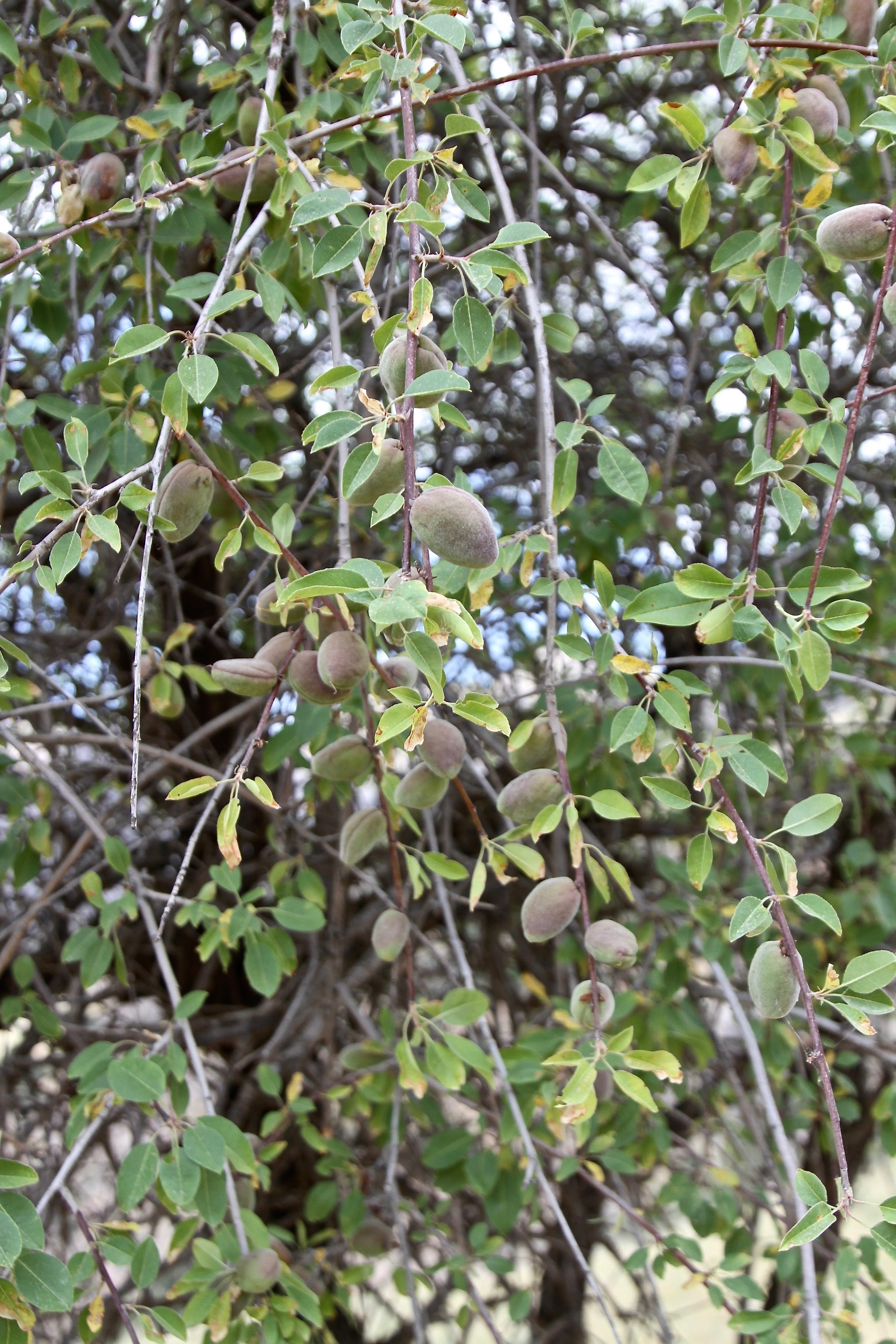

Scientific classification
- Kingdom: Plantae
- Clade: Tracheophytes
- Clade: Angiosperms
- Clade: Eudicots
- Clade: Rosids
- Order: Rosales
- Family: Rosaceae
- Genus: Prunus
- Species: P. bucharica

Binomial name
- Prunus bucharica (Korsh.) Hand.-Mazz.

Synonyms
- Amygdalus bucharica Korsh.; Prunus amygdalus Batsch var. ovalifolia Franch.

= Prunus bucharica =

Species of wild almond from Central Asia

Prunus bucharica is a species of wild almond native to Tajikistan, Uzbekistan and Afghanistan, preferring to grow at 1000-1800 m above sea level. Long thought to be one of the wild species that contributed to the origin of the cultivated almond (Prunus dulcis), genetic testing of both nuclear and chloroplast DNA has shown that to be untrue; the closest relative (and presumed lone ancestor) of Prunus dulcis is Prunus fenzliana.

== Description ==
Prunus bucharica is a tall shrub or small tree between 1.5 and 7 m tall. Prunus bucharica differs from all other almonds in having broadly ovate leaves and a completely smooth endocarp.
