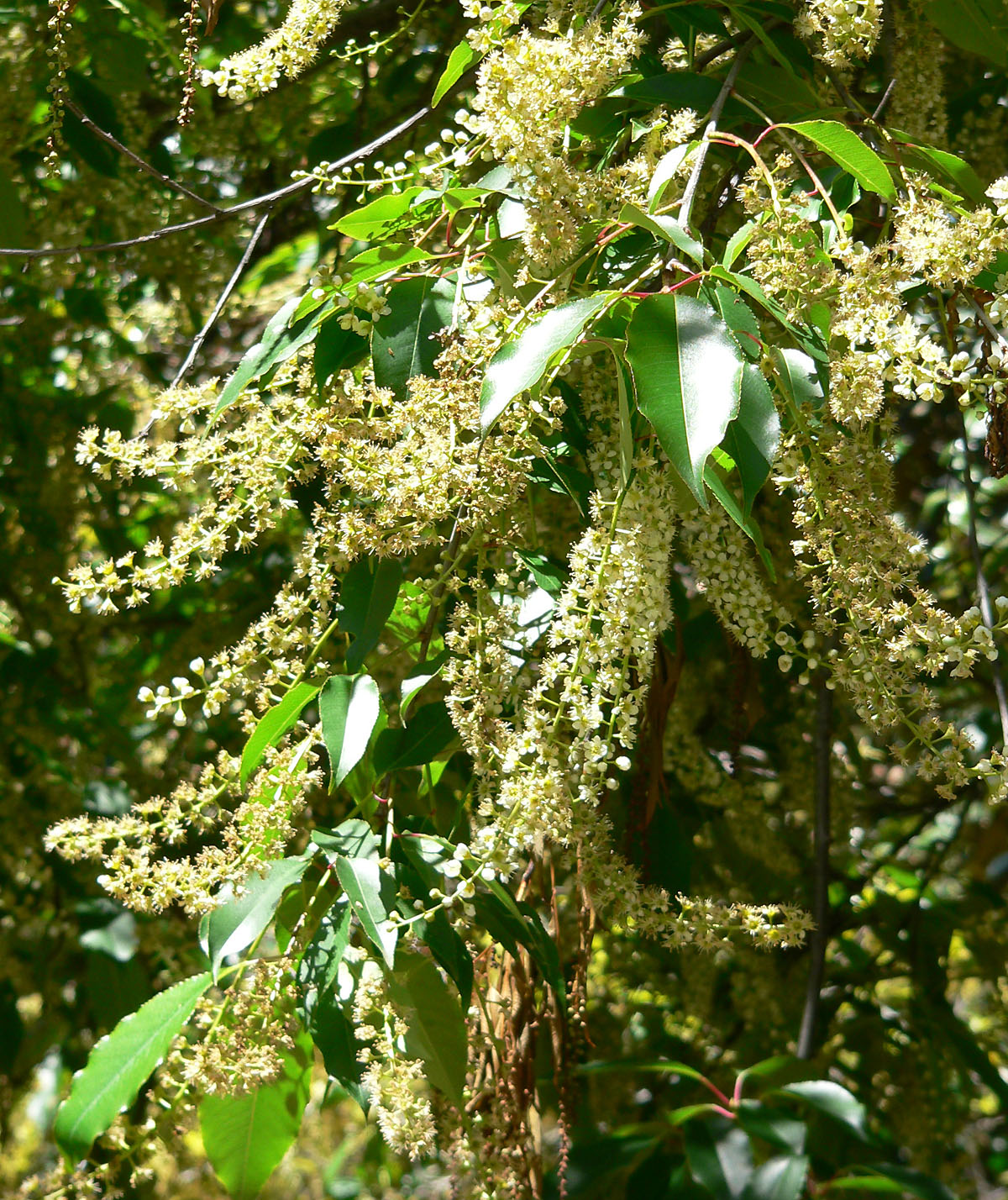

Conservation status
- Least Concern (IUCN 3.1)

Scientific classification
- Kingdom: Plantae
- Clade: Tracheophytes
- Clade: Angiosperms
- Clade: Eudicots
- Clade: Rosids
- Order: Rosales
- Family: Rosaceae
- Genus: Prunus
- Species: P. brachybotrya

Binomial name
- Prunus brachybotrya Zucc.

Synonyms
- Cerasus brachybotrys (Zucc.) K.Koch; Cerasus schiedeana (Steud.) K.Koch; Laurocerasus brachybotrys (Zucc.) M.Roem.; Laurocerasus mexicana M.Roem.; Prunus laurifolia Schltdl.; Prunus prionophylla Standl.; Prunus schiedeana Steud.

= Prunus brachybotrya =

Species of tree

Prunus brachybotrya is a species of tree in the family Rosaceae. It is native to Mexico. Individuals have been found growing in Central American countries. The resplendent quetzal has been observed feeding on this tree.

== Distribution and habitat ==
P. brachybotrya is found in southeastern Mexico, particularly in Chiapas, and grows in cloud forests between 1200–2400 m of elevation.

== Uses ==
The wood of P. brachybotrya is reddish brown in color and is suitable for woodturning. Among the Tarahumara its leaves, which smell strongly of hydrogen cyanide, are used to kill fish when harvesting a pond, applied to deter insects from biting, and used in infusions to relieve coughs and other ailments.
