= Prunus salasii =

Scientific classification
- Kingdom: Plantae
- Clade: Tracheophytes
- Clade: Angiosperms
- Clade: Eudicots
- Clade: Rosids
- Order: Rosales
- Family: Rosaceae
- Genus: Prunus
- Species: P. salasii

Binomial name
- Prunus salasii Standl.

Species of flowering plant

Prunus salasii, called carretero, carreto, cerezo, cereza or cereza montés in Guatemala, and sapoyolillo or zapoyolillo in Mexico, is a species of Prunus in the family Rosaceae. It is native to Chiapas in Mexico, Guatemala, Honduras and El Salvador. A fast-growing tree usually 9-15 m, but reaching 35 m, it is planted in Guatemalan ranches and parks as a shade tree. The resplendent quetzal favors it as a nesting site.
