= Prunus reflexa =

Scientific classification
- Kingdom: Plantae
- Clade: Tracheophytes
- Clade: Angiosperms
- Clade: Eudicots
- Clade: Rosids
- Order: Rosales
- Family: Rosaceae
- Genus: Prunus
- Species: P. reflexa

Binomial name
- Prunus reflexa (Gardner) Walp.

Synonyms
- Cerasus reflexa Gardner; Prunus myrtifolia var. reflexa (Gardner) Koehne; Prunus sellowii Koehne

Species of tree

Prunus reflexa is a species of tree in the family Rosaceae. It is native to South America.

== Distribution and habitat ==
Prunus reflexa occurs in montane cloud forests, valleys and semi-deciduous dry forests from Ecuador south to Bolivia, between 600–2,600 m (2,000–8,500 ft) of elevation.
