= Prunus kotschyi =

Scientific classification
- Kingdom: Plantae
- Clade: Tracheophytes
- Clade: Angiosperms
- Clade: Eudicots
- Clade: Rosids
- Order: Rosales
- Family: Rosaceae
- Genus: Prunus
- Species: P. kotschyi

Binomial name
- Prunus kotschyi (Boiss. & Hohen. ex Spach) Meikle

Synonyms
- Amygdalus kotschyi Boiss. & Hohen. ex Spach

Species of plant in the rose family

Prunus kotschyi is a plant first described by Pierre Edmond Boissier and Rudolph Friedrich Hohenacker, and received its current name from a revision by Robert Desmond Meikle. No subspecies are known. It is native to Iraq.
