= Prunus wurdackii =

Scientific classification
- Kingdom: Plantae
- Clade: Tracheophytes
- Clade: Angiosperms
- Clade: Eudicots
- Clade: Rosids
- Order: Rosales
- Family: Rosaceae
- Genus: Prunus
- Species: P. wurdackii

Binomial name
- Prunus wurdackii C.L. Li & Aymard

Species of flowering plant

Prunus wurdackii is a species of Prunus found only on the slopes of tepuis of the Chimantá Massif in Venezuela, at 900–2,200 m (3,000–7,200 ft) in elevation. Judging from its morphology, it is closely related to Prunus espinozana, described in the same publication. It is a tree 3 to 15 m tall, with branchlets that are brown tending to black. It differs from Prunus littlei, another close relative, in having thicker, more leathery and more lustrous leaves, with longer petioles, measuring between 8–14 mm (0.3–0.6 in). Its solitary inflorescences, by contrast, have shorter pedicels and shorter styles. Its calyx is salmon-colored, and the petals white.
