= Flowering almond =

Flowering almond is a common name for several plants and may refer to:

- Prunus glandulosa, native to China and present in Japan
- Prunus jacquemontii, native to Afghanistan, India, Pakistan, Tajikistan, and Tibet
- Prunus triloba

== See also ==
- Prunus tenella, Dwarf Russian Almond, grown as an ornamental plant
