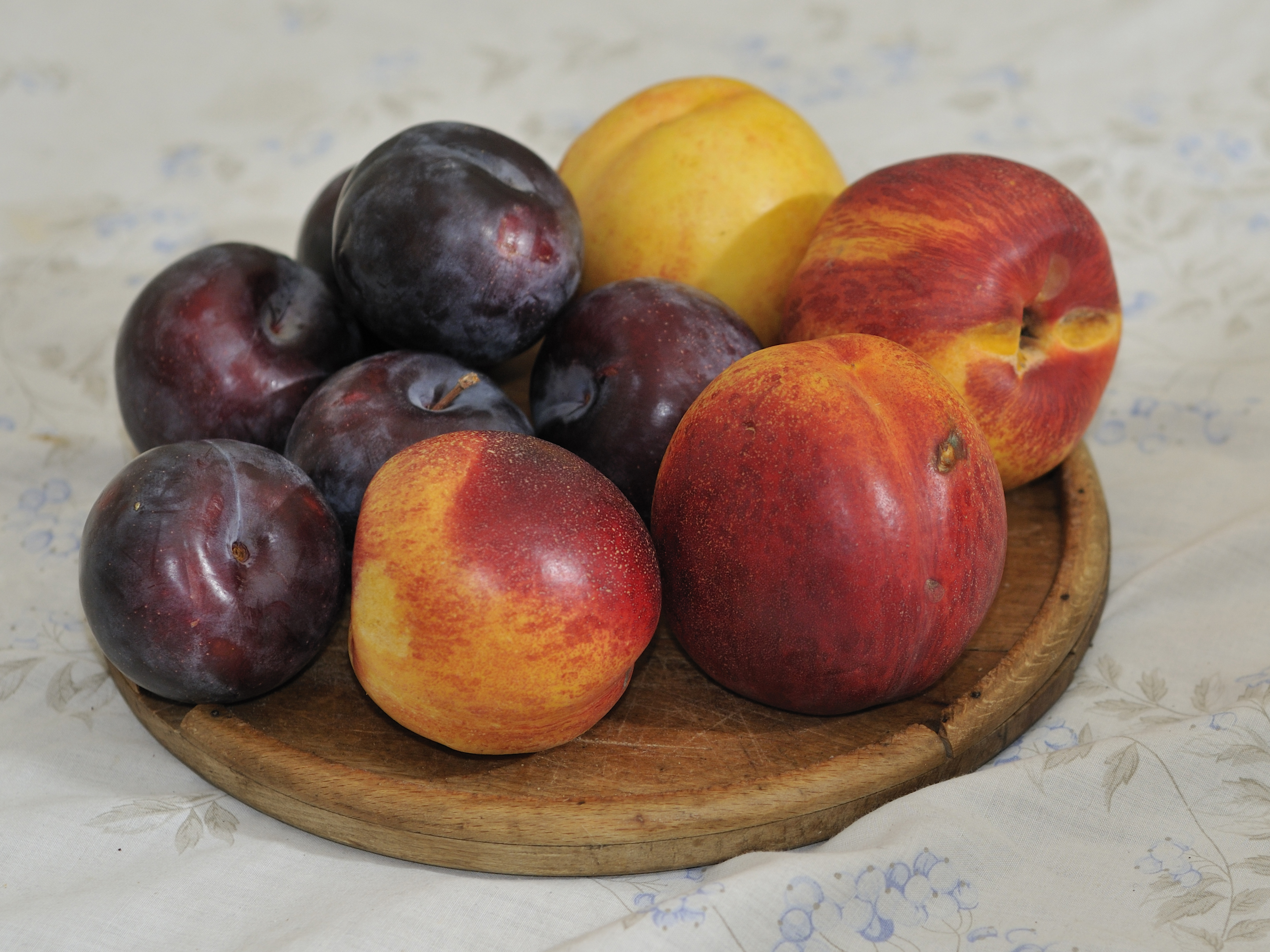
- Plums and nectarines

Scientific classification
- Kingdom: Plantae
- Clade: Embryophytes
- Clade: Tracheophytes
- Clade: Angiosperms
- Clade: Eudicots
- Clade: Rosids
- Order: Rosales
- Family: Rosaceae
- Genus: Prunus
- Subgenus: Prunus subg. Prunus

Section
- See text.

= Prunus subg. Prunus =

Subgenus of plants

Prunus subg. Prunus is a subgenus of Prunus. This subgenus includes plums, apricots and bush cherries. Some species conventionally included in Prunus subg. Amygdalus are clustered with plum/apricot species according to molecular phylogenetic studies. Shi et al. (2013) has incorporated subg. Amygdalus into subg. Prunus, thereby including almonds and peaches in this subgenus. The species in this subgenus have solitary flowers or 2–3 in a fascicle.

== Sections according to Shi et al. (2013) ==
Shi et al. (2013) divide subg. Prunus into seven sections: sect. Amygdalus, sect. Armeniaca, sect. Emplectocladus, sect. Microcerasus, sect. Persicae, sect. Prunocerasus and sect. Prunus. They form three clades. The basal clade is sect. Emplectocladus which is sometimes treated as a subgenus. The other two clades are the Amygdalus-Persicae clade (sometimes treated as subg. Amygdalus) and the Armeniaca-Microcerasus-Prunocerasus-Prunus clade (subg. Prunus in a narrow sense).

=== Sect. Emplectocladus ===
Prunus sect. Emplectocladus (Torr.) A.Gray is the sister group to all the other species in this subgenus, and sometimes treated as a distinct subgenus, Prunus subg. Emplectocladus (Torr.) S.C.Mason. It includes six New World species.

- Prunus fasciculata – desert almond
- Prunus cercocarpifolia
- Prunus eremophila – Mojave Desert almond
- Prunus havardii – Havard's wild almond
- Prunus microphylla – Mexican wild almond
- Prunus minutiflora – Texas wild almond

=== Sect. Amygdalus ===
Prunus sect. Amygdalus (L.) Benth. & Hook.f. and the next section (Persica) sometimes constitute Prunus subg. Amygdalus (L.) Focke which is monophyletic, but the incongruence between nuclear and chloroplast DNA phylogenies blurs the boundary between the two sections somewhat. The word "ămygdălus" is Latin for the almond nut.

This section includes most Old World almond species except P. mongolica, P. tangutica, P. triloba, P. pedunculata, P. tenella, P. petunnikowii and probably other related species.

Selected species:

- Prunus arabica – Arabian wild almond
- Prunus amygdalus – almond
- Prunus fenzliana
- Prunus spinosissima – thorny almond

=== Sect. Persica ===
Prunus sect. Persica (Mill.) Nakai (Note: Shi et al. (2013) gave this section a superfluous name, Prunus sect. Persicae (T.T.Yü & L.T.Lu) S.L.Zhou.) includes peach species as well as two species previously considered almonds (P. mongolica and P. tangutica).

- Prunus davidiana – Chinese peach
- Prunus ferganensis – Fergana peach
- Prunus kansuensis – Gansu peach
- Prunus mira – Tibetan peach
- Prunus mongolica – Mongolian almond
- Prunus persica – Persian peach / Common peach
- Prunus tangutica – Tangut almond

=== Sect. Armeniaca ===
Species in this Prunus sect. Armeniaca (Scop.) Koch are apricots, native to Eurasia.

Selected species:

- Prunus armeniaca – apricot
- Prunus mandshurica – Manchurian apricot
- Prunus mume – Mei or Chinese flowering plum
- Prunus sibirica – Siberian apricot

=== Sect. Microcerasus ===
Species in Prunus sect. Microcerasus (Webb & Berthel.) C.K.Schneid. are known as bush cherries or dwarf cherries.

Selected species:

- Prunus glandulosa
- Prunus japonica
- Prunus prostrata
- Prunus pumila
- Prunus tianshanica
- Prunus tomentosa

=== Sect. Prunocerasus ===
Prunus sect. Prunocerasus Koehne includes New World plums and peachbush (P. texana).

Selected species:

- Prunus americana – American plum
- Prunus angustifolia – sand plum
- Prunus maritima – beach plum
- Prunus mexicana – Mexican plum
- Prunus nigra – Canada plum
- Prunus texana – peachbush

=== Sect. Prunus ===
Prunus sect. Prunus includes Old World plums.

Selected species:

- Prunus cerasifera – cherry plum
- Prunus domestica – European plum
- Prunus salicina – Chinese plum
- Prunus simonii – apricot plum
- Prunus spinosa – sloe

== Additional sections ==
Species of the following sections were not presented in the results of Shi et al. (2013). Therefore, their relationship with the sections proposed by Shi et al. (2013) is unclear.

=== Sect. Chamaeamygdalus ===
Prunus sect. Chamaeamygdalus (Spach) Dippel used to be included in the Amygdalus-Persica clade. However, molecular phylogenetic research indicates that it should be excluded from the Amygdalus-Persica clade. The phylogenetic positions of the species in this section are still uncertain.

- Prunus tenella – Russian almond
- Prunus petunnikowii

=== Sect. Louiseania ===
Prunus sect. Louiseania (Carrière) Yazbek includes two or three Asian species. They are called flowering almond and morphologically close to wild almonds (sect. Amygdalus), but they are more related to bush cherries (sect. Microcerasus) and apricots (sect. Armeniaca). According to nuclear phylogenomic analyses, the type species of sect. Louiseania, P. triloba, is embedded in sect. Microcerasus and closely related to the P. prostrata, the type species of sect. Microcerasus. However, in the phylogenetic tree based on plastid genome, P. triloba together with P. tomentosa (also a member of sect. Microcerasus) and apricots is in a clade that is sister to the core part of sect. Microcerasus. The incongruity is attributable to multiple hybridization events during the speciation of P. triloba, which probably involves species of sect. Amygdalus, sect. Armeniaca, sect. Microcerasus, sect. Prunus, and even subg. Cerasus.

- Prunus pedunculata
- Prunus triloba
- Prunus ulmifolia

=== Sect. Penarmeniaca ===
Prunus sect. Penarmeniaca S.C.Mason is the sister group to the New World section Prunocerasus and probably the Old World species P. tenella. It includes two New World species.

- Prunus andersonii – desert peach
- Prunus fremontii – desert apricot
