= Prunus kansuensis =

Scientific classification
- Kingdom: Plantae
- Clade: Tracheophytes
- Clade: Angiosperms
- Clade: Eudicots
- Clade: Rosids
- Order: Rosales
- Family: Rosaceae
- Genus: Prunus
- Species: P. kansuensis

Binomial name
- Prunus kansuensis Rehder

Synonyms
- Amygdalus kansuensis (Rehder) Skeels; Amygdalus kansuensis var. obtusinucleata Y.F.Qu, Xue L.Chen & Y.S.Lian; Persica kansuensis (Rehder) Kovalev & Kostina

Species of tree

Prunus kansuensis (Chinese: 甘肃桃; pinyin: Gānsù táo; lit. 'Gansu peach'), sometimes called the Chinese bush peach, is a putative species of peach native to China. It is found in Gansu, Guizhou, Hubei, Qinghai, Shaanxi and Sichuan provinces. It is a shrub or tree 3 to 7 m (10 to 23 ft) tall, preferring to grow at 1,000 to 2,300 m (3,300 to 7,500 ft) above sea level. A genetic and morphological study has shown that it is conspecific with Prunus persica, the cultivated peach. P. kansuensis is being investigated as a source for rootstocks and for crop improvement due to its resistance to multiple diseases, to drought, and to frost. It is unaffected by peach mosaic virus, resistant to the root-knot nematode Meloidogyne incognita, and tolerates winter temperatures down to −35 °C (−31 °F).

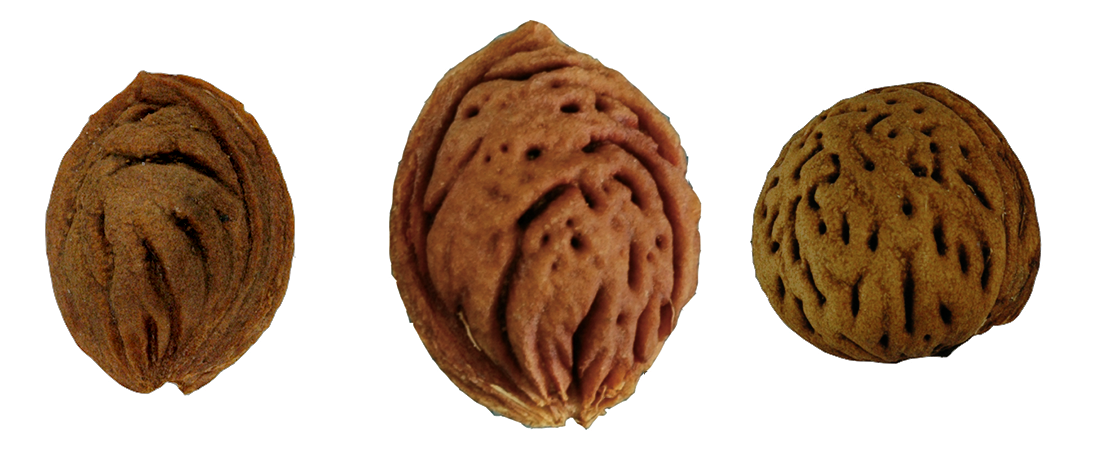
Prunus kansuensis pit (left) grooved but not pitted, P. persica (center), and P. davidiana (right)

== Description ==
Prunus kansuensis can be difficult to distinguish from its close relatives P. mira (Tibetan peach), P. davidiana (Chinese wild peach), and P. persica (domestic peach), especially if only vegetative characters are used. (Note: Yazbek's treatment is largely followed here. She included Prunus ferganensis, the Fergana peach, as a mere variety of P. persica in her monograph. She found that it had no distinguishing genetic or morphological characters whatsoever.) Many specimens of P. kansuensis are shrubs, whereas most specimens of the other species are trees. P. kansuensis and P. mira have smooth endocarps (covering of the seed) but P. davidiana and P. persica endocarps have the typically pitted appearance seen in domestic peaches. P. kansuensis can be distinguished from P. mira by having externally pubescent (or rarely subglabrous) sepals; P. mira sepals are externally glabrous. P. davidiana mesocarps (the flesh of the fruits) dry out, the other species' fruits remain moist. P. davidiana has a number of other distinguishing characters, and is also genetically divergent from the other peaches.

P. kansuensis winter buds are ovoid to long ovoid and glabrous, P. persica winter buds are conical and pubescent. P. kansuensis petioles are about 0.5 to 1 cm (0.2 to 0.4 in) long, P. persica petioles are about 1 to 2 cm (0.4 to 0.8 in) long. There are subtle but inconsistent differences in the leaves, with P. kansuensis leaves typically a bit shorter and with fewer serrations per unit length than P. persica. There are also subtle difference in floral characters, the most obvious being that the styles in P. kansuensis flowers are longer than the stamens, with P. persica styles shorter (or at most equal to) their stamens.

== Uses ==
In China it is used as a rootstock for cultivated peaches and almonds, and sometimes grown as an ornamental for its profuse shell-pink flowers which blossom in early spring. When cultivated and tended, it often takes the tree form. P. kansuensis is a ruderal species and is used in the process of returning farmland to forest, since it can provide some income to farmers during the transition. Its white-fleshed fruit is small, relatively flavorless, and is not generally considered salable, although some people cultivate and eat them locally. The fruit is eaten by the endangered golden snub‑nosed monkeys (Rhinopithecus roxellana).
