= Flowering plum =

Flowering plum is a common name for several species in the plum genus (Prunus) cultivated for their flowers, and may refer to:

- Prunus cerasifera, native to Europe
- Prunus mume, native to eastern Asia
- Prunus triloba, native to eastern Asia
