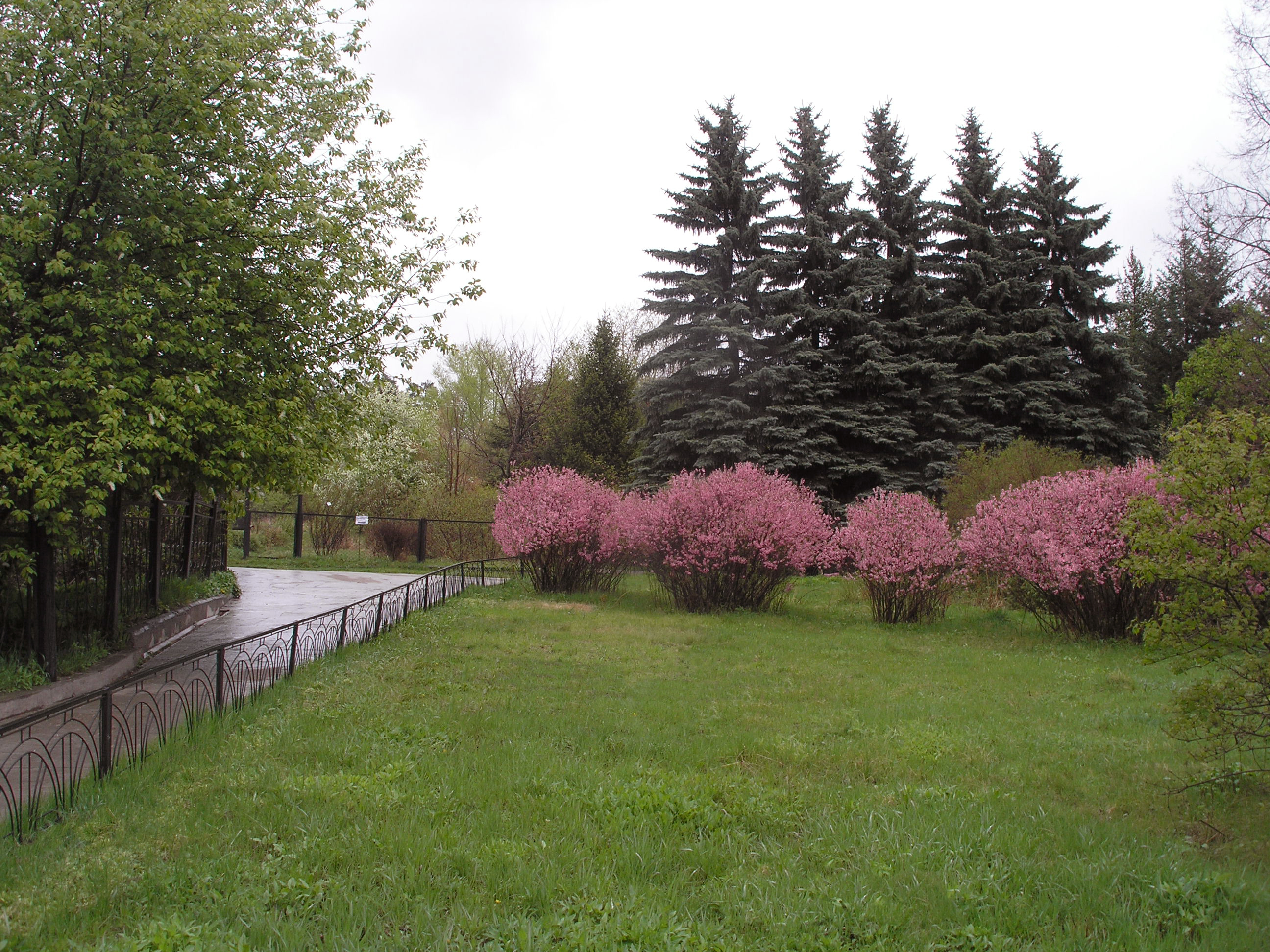
- P. pedunculata displaying their vivid pink flowers at the Botanic Garden of the Irkutsk State University. Note that the lower third of the bushes are bare stems, allowing for wind‑blown soil capture.

Scientific classification
- Kingdom: Plantae
- Clade: Tracheophytes
- Clade: Angiosperms
- Clade: Eudicots
- Clade: Rosids
- Order: Rosales
- Family: Rosaceae
- Genus: Prunus
- Subgenus: Prunus subg. Prunus
- Section: Prunus sect. Louiseania
- Species: P. pedunculata

Binomial name
- Prunus pedunculata (Pall.) Maxim.

Synonyms
- Amygdalus pallasii Turcz.; Amygdalus pallasii Turcz. ex Steud.; Amygdalus pedunculata (Note: Older sources may be referring to Prunus triloba) Pall.; Amygdalus pedunculatus Pall. (Note: Chinese researchers appear to (mis)associate Amygdalus pedunculata/pedunculatus with two very distinct phenotypes: Liu, Jiang-Qun; Yin, Ming-Yu; Zuo, Si-Yu; Yang, Shao-Bing; Wuyun, Tana (10 October 2017). "Phenotypic variations in natural populations of Amygdalus pedunculata". Chinese Journal of Plant Ecology. 41 (10): 1091–1102. doi:10.17521/cjpe.2017.0104.); Amygdalus pilosa Turcz.; Armeniaca pedunculata hort.; Armeniaca pedunculata hort. ex Loudon; Louiseania pedunculata (Pall.) G.V.Eremin & A.A.Yushev; Prunus pallasiana Dorffer; Prunus pilosa (Turcz.) Maxim.

= Prunus pedunculata =

Species of flowering plant

Prunus pedunculata is a species of Prunus known in China as long‑peduncled almond (长梗扁桃). It is native to China (particularly the Inner Mongolia Autonomous Region), Mongolia and nearby sections of Siberia. A small bush, reaching 1-2 m, its pink flowers allow it to be used as an ornamental. Adapted to cold, arid environments, its many‑stemmed growth habit fixes blowing sand, an important contribution to succession. As Amygdalus pedunculatus Pall., it seems to be being evaluated for its seed oil potential.
