= Prunus cercocarpifolia =

Scientific classification
- Kingdom: Plantae
- Clade: Embryophytes
- Clade: Tracheophytes
- Clade: Spermatophytes
- Clade: Angiosperms
- Clade: Eudicots
- Clade: Rosids
- Order: Rosales
- Family: Rosaceae
- Genus: Prunus
- Subgenus: Prunus subg. Prunus
- Section: Prunus sect. Emplectocladus
- Species: P. cercocarpifolia

Binomial name
- Prunus cercocarpifolia Villarreal

Species of flowering plant

Prunus cercocarpifolia is a species of Prunus found in the Chihuahuan Desert, in the south of the Mexican state of Coahuila. Judging from its morphology, it is closely related to Prunus microphylla. When initially collected, Eupelmid wasps were found within the pits.
