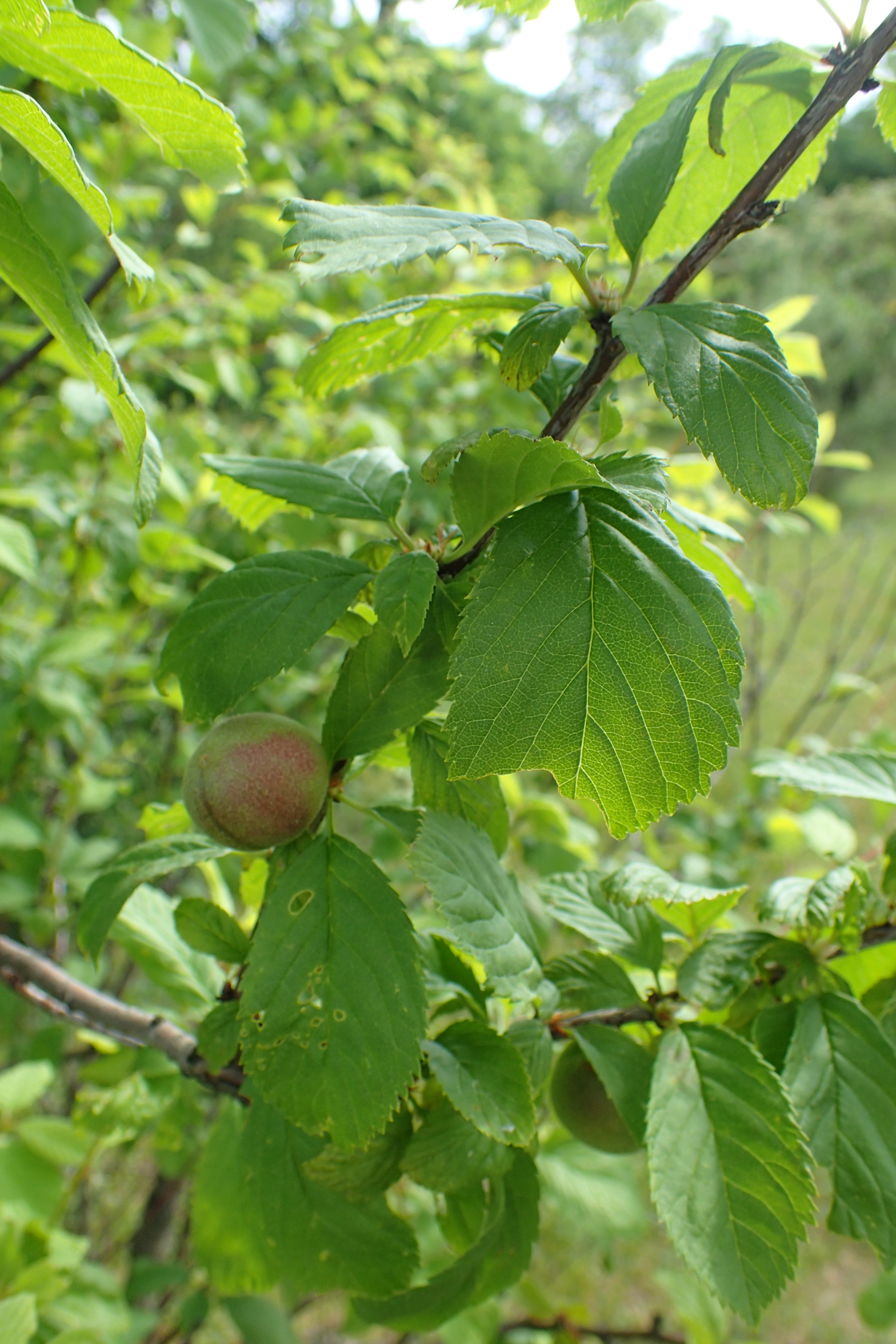

Scientific classification
- Kingdom: Plantae
- Clade: Tracheophytes
- Clade: Angiosperms
- Clade: Eudicots
- Clade: Rosids
- Order: Rosales
- Family: Rosaceae
- Genus: Prunus
- Species: P. ulmifolia

Binomial name
- Prunus ulmifolia Franch.

Synonyms
- Aflatunia ulmifolia (Franch.) Vassilcz.; Amygdalus ulmifolia (Franch.) Popov; Louiseania ulmifolia (Franch.) Pachom.; Prunus baldshuanica Regel

= Prunus ulmifolia =

Species of flowering plant

Prunus ulmifolia is species of Prunus native to Central Asia. It is often treated as a synonym of the East Asian species P. triloba . However, they are distinctly different in leaves, flowers and fruits. P. triloba have slightly trilobed leaves, campanulate calyx tubes, unpitted stones, and fruits splitting when ripe, whereas P. ulmifolia have leaves without lobes, cylindrical calyx tubes, stones finely pitted with irregularly branching furrows, and fruits not splitting.
