= Coleophora kuznetzovi =

Scientific classification
- Kingdom: Animalia
- Phylum: Arthropoda
- Class: Insecta
- Order: Lepidoptera
- Family: Coleophoridae
- Genus: Coleophora
- Species: C. kuznetzovi

Binomial name
- Coleophora kuznetzovi Toll, 1961

Species of moth

Coleophora kuznetzovi is a moth of the family Coleophoridae. It is found in Tajikistan.

The larvae feed on Amygdalus, Crataegus, Malus, Pyrus and Cotoneaster species. They feed on the leaves of their host plant.
