= Prunus tangutica =

Scientific classification
- Kingdom: Plantae
- Clade: Tracheophytes
- Clade: Angiosperms
- Clade: Eudicots
- Clade: Rosids
- Order: Rosales
- Family: Rosaceae
- Genus: Prunus
- Species: P. tangutica

Binomial name
- Prunus tangutica (Batalin) Koehne

Synonyms
- Amygdalus tangutica Batalin; Amygdalus tangutica (Batalin) Korsh.; Persica tangutica (Batalin) Kov. & Kost.; Amygdalus dehiscens Ricker; Prunus dehiscens Koehne

Species of tree

Prunus tangutica (Chinese: 西康扁桃 or 唐古特扁桃) is a species of wild peach native to China. Based on its fruit traits it had been considered a wild almond, but genetic and morphological studies have shown that it is more closely related to Prunus persica, the cultivated peach, with its closest relative being Prunus mongolica. It is a very dense spiny shrub or shrubby tree, usually 1 to 2.5 m tall but reaching 4 m, preferring to grow on sunny slopes and alongside streams at 1500 to 2600 m, but found as high as 3400 m. Its flower petals are a pale pink, and its velutinous (velvety) fruit are green when unripe and purplish‑red when ripe. The fruits' mesocarps (fleshy exterior) splits when ripe, which led to it being classified as an almond for over a century, with the exception of Kovalev & Kostina in 1935, who assigned it to Persica.
