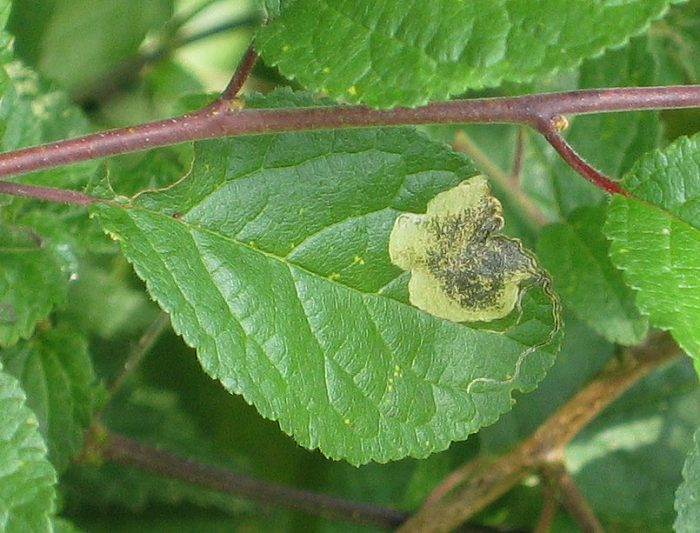

Scientific classification
- Kingdom: Animalia
- Phylum: Arthropoda
- Clade: Pancrustacea
- Class: Insecta
- Order: Lepidoptera
- Family: Nepticulidae
- Genus: Stigmella
- Species: S. plagicolella

Binomial name
- Stigmella plagicolella (Stainton, 1854)

Synonyms
- Nepticula plagicolella Stainton, 1854

= Stigmella plagicolella =

Species of moth

Stigmella plagicolella is a moth of the family Nepticulidae described by Henry Tibbats Stainton in 1854. It is found in all of Europe (except Iceland and Norway) and the Near East.

== Description ==
The wingspan is 4–5 mm. The thick erect hairs on the head vertex are orange and the collar dark bronze fuscous-white. Antennal eyecaps are whitish. Forewings are shining deep purplish-bronze; a shining whitish fascia beyond middle; apical area beyond this dark purple-fuscous Hindwings are grey.

Adults are bivoltine and are on wing from May to June and again in August.

Egg

The egg is laid on the underside of a leaf in June or August, usually near the midrib.

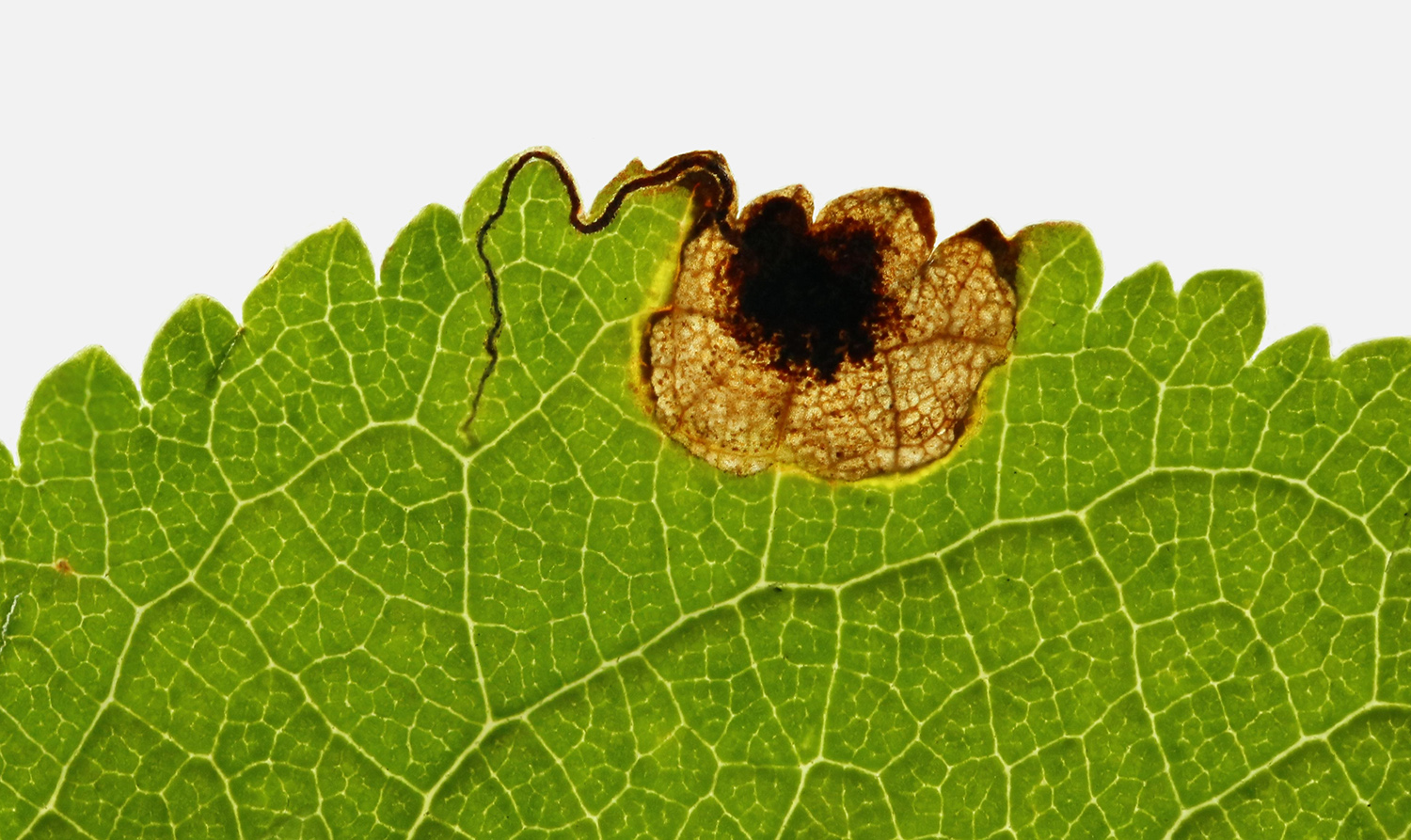
Stigmella plagicolella mine in Prunus spinosa Craig Tremeirchion, North Wales

Larva

The larvae are pale, whitish yellow with a reddish brown head. They mine the leaves of their host plant, initially in a slender corridor with a wide uninterrupted frass line. After a moult this corridor abruptly widens into a blotch. Stigmella plagicolella feed on the following plants, apple (Malus domestica), apricot (Prunus armeniaca), wild cherry (Prunus avium), cherry plum (Prunus cerasifera), Prunus cerasifera var. pissardii, plum (Prunus domestica), Prunus domestica insititia, mahaleb cherry (Prunus mahaleb), Chinese plum (Prunus mume), blackthorn (Prunus spinosa), Klamath plum (Prunus subcordata) and flowering plum (Prunus triloba). They mine the leaves of their host plant.

Pupation

Pupation takes place outside of the mine in a pale ochreous brown cocoon.

== Etymology ==
Stigmella hybnerella was described by the English entomologist, Henry Tibbats Stainton in 1854 from a type specimen found in England. The genus Stigmella – ″stigma″, refers to the conspicuous (or occasionally metallic) small dot or a brand fascia on the forewing of many of the Stigmella species, or possibly the small size of the moths. The species name plagicolella refers to plaga – flat, open ground and colo– to inhabit, on blackthorn, often occurring is such situations.
