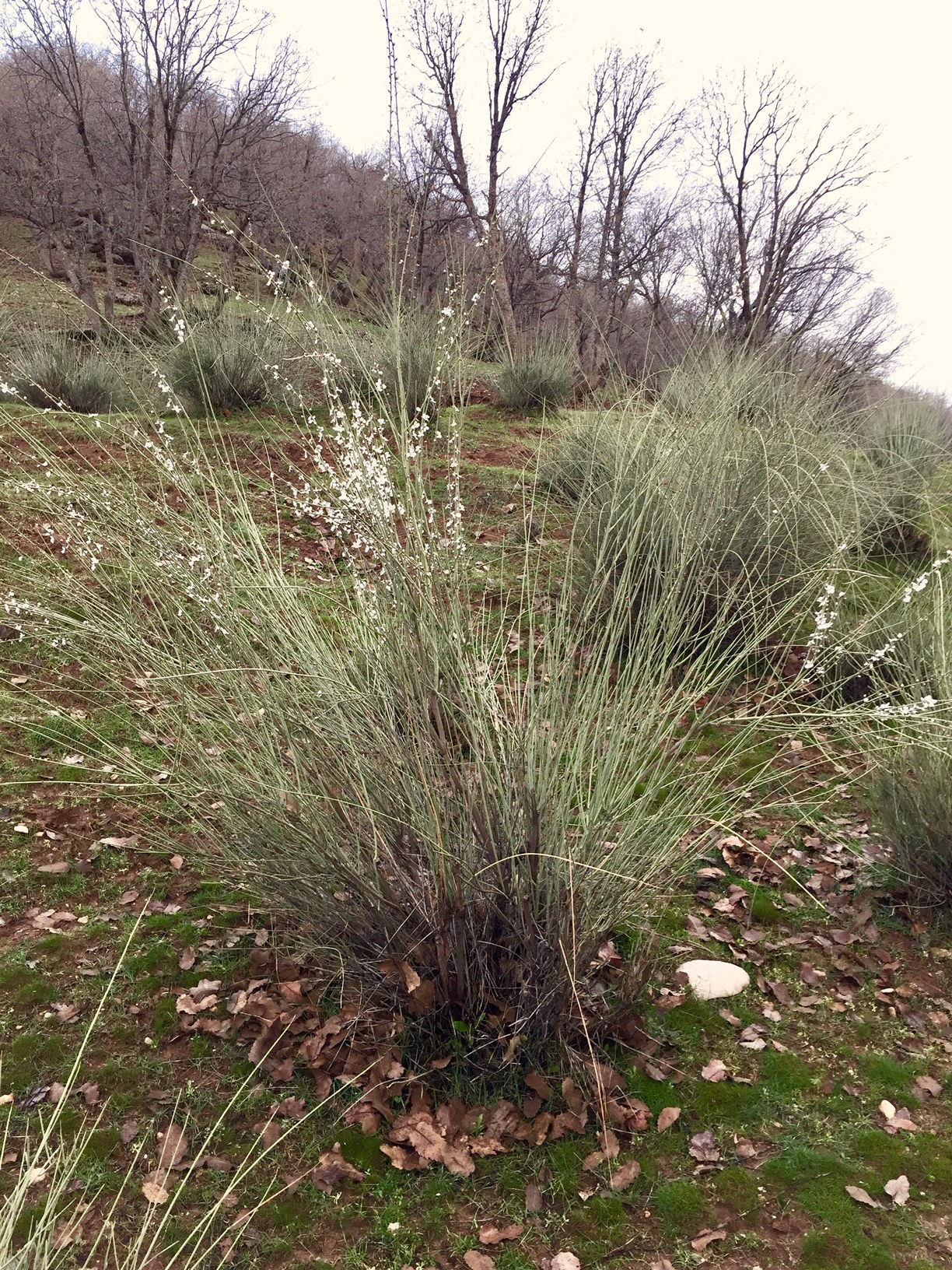
- Prunus arabica in Bazoft, Iran

Conservation status
- Near Threatened (IUCN 3.1)

Scientific classification
- Kingdom: Plantae
- Clade: Tracheophytes
- Clade: Angiosperms
- Clade: Eudicots
- Clade: Rosids
- Order: Rosales
- Family: Rosaceae
- Genus: Prunus
- Subgenus: Prunus subg. Amygdalus
- Section: Prunus sect. Amygdalus
- Species: P. arabica

Binomial name
- Prunus arabica (Olivier) Meikle

Synonyms
- Amygdalus arabica Olivier; Amygdalus arabica var. pubipetala V.Denisov & S.Serafimov; Amygdalus spartioides Spach; Prunus spartioides (Spach) C.K.Schneid.; Amygdalus agrestis (Boiss.) Yazbek; Prunus agrestis (Jord. & Fourr.) Yazbek; Amygdalus glauca Browicz; Prunus glauca (Browicz) A. E. Murray

= Prunus arabica =

Species of wild almond from the Middle East

Prunus arabica is a species of wild almond found across the Middle East. It is a broomlike shrub typically 0.75 to 2 m tall, with brown bark. Its leaves have a 5-8 mm petiole and the leaf blades are 15 to 44 mm long and 3 to 10 mm wide. Its inflorescences have dark red hypanthia and sepals (green on the interior of the sepals), and white, pale pink or pink petals. The flowers are borne on a pedicel about 3 mm long, which lengthens to 6 mm when the fruit is fully developed.

It prefers to grow in arid or semiarid areas at 500 to 2700 m above sea level. A full genetic and morphological analysis suggests that Prunus scoparia may be conspecific with it; certainly it is its closest relative. It is occasionally cultivated for erosion control, as its brushy growth form makes a good windbreak.

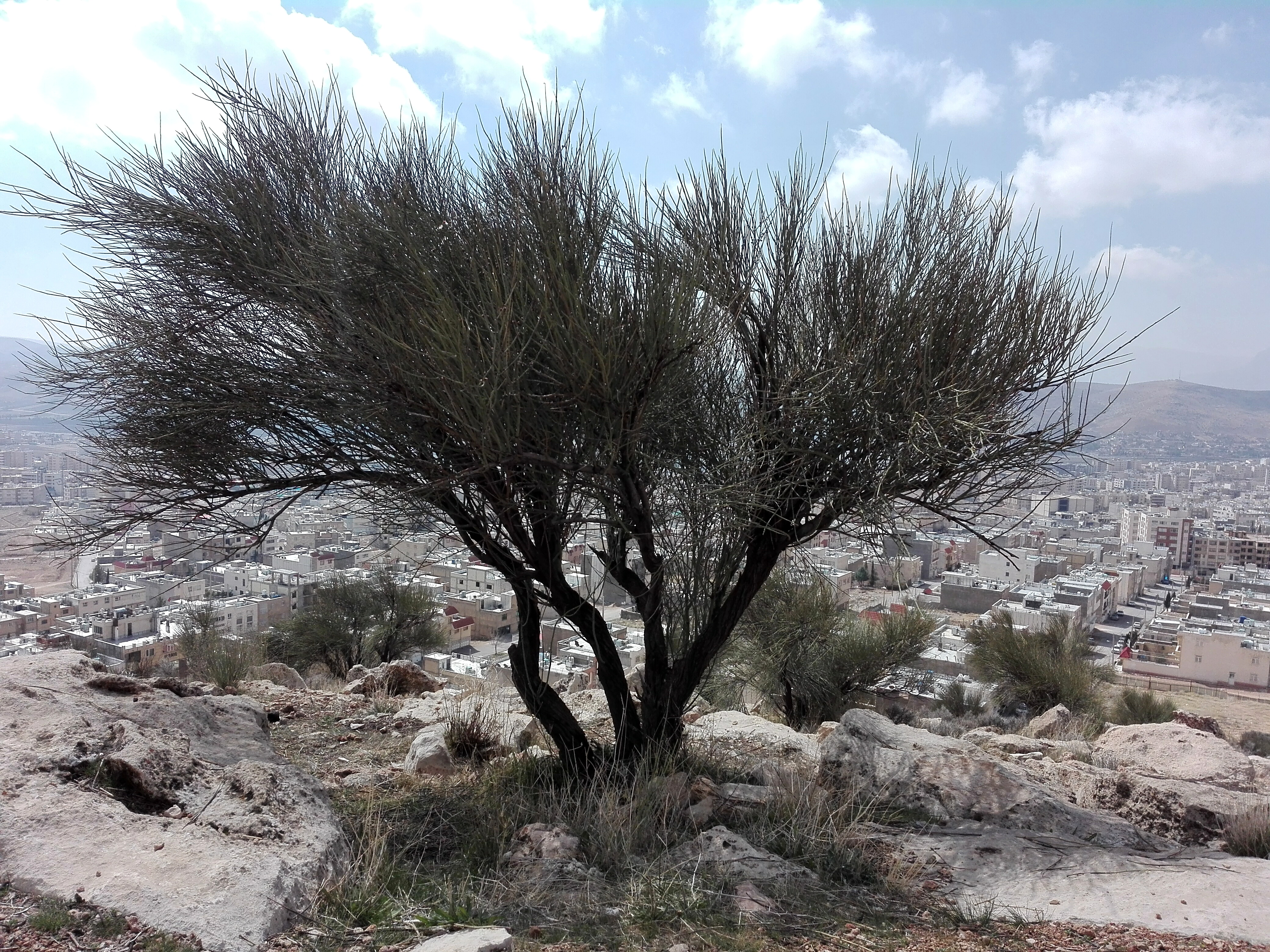
Prunus arabica

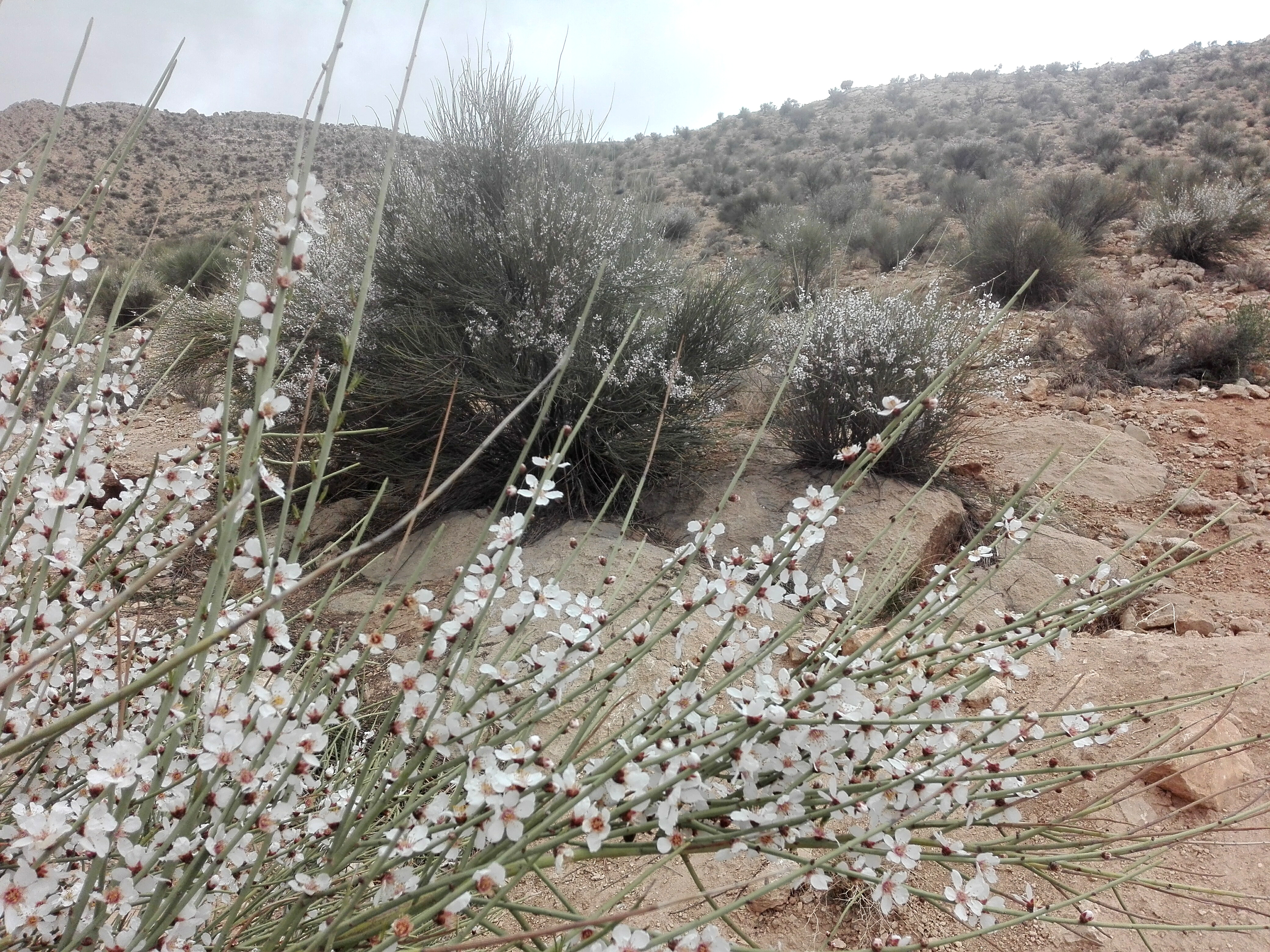
Prunus arabica blossoms near Shiraz, Iran
