= Fergana peach =

Conservation status
- Data Deficient (IUCN 3.1)

Scientific classification
- Kingdom: Plantae
- Clade: Tracheophytes
- Clade: Angiosperms
- Clade: Eudicots
- Clade: Rosids
- Order: Rosales
- Family: Rosaceae
- Genus: Prunus
- Subgenus: Prunus subg. Amygdalus
- Species: P. ferganensis

Binomial name
- Prunus ferganensis (Kost. & Rjab.) Y.Y.Yao

Synonyms
- Prunus persica subsp. ferganensis Kost. & Rjab.; Persica ferganensis (Kost. & Rjab.) Koval. & Kost. comb. inval.; Amygdalus ferganensis (Kost. & Rjab.) T.T.Yu & L.T.Lu

Species of flowering plant

The Fergana peach, Prunus ferganensis, is either a species or a landrace of peach (Prunus persica), depending on the authority believed. P. ferganensis is found growing in, and takes its name from, the Fergana Valley of Central Asia. It differs from other domesticated peaches in having smaller fruit with no red blush, a groove in the pit, and unbranched leaf veins. In spite of these morphological differences, genetically P. ferganensis is deeply embedded within the domestic peach lineage.
