= Prunus mongolica =

Scientific classification
- Kingdom: Plantae
- Clade: Tracheophytes
- Clade: Angiosperms
- Clade: Eudicots
- Clade: Rosids
- Order: Rosales
- Family: Rosaceae
- Genus: Prunus
- Species: P. mongolica

Binomial name
- Prunus mongolica Maxim.

Synonyms
- Amygdalus mongolica (Maxim.) Ricker

Species of plant

Prunus mongolica (the Mongolian almond) is a species of Prunus native to China and Mongolia, particularly the Gobi Desert. A small scrubby bush, reaching 1–2 m, it is adapted to extreme drought. Genetic studies have shown that it is more closely related to the peaches, with its closest relative being Prunus tangutica.
