= Prunus eremophila =

Conservation status
- Endangered (IUCN 3.1)

- Critically Imperiled (NatureServe)

Scientific classification
- Kingdom: Plantae
- Clade: Embryophytes
- Clade: Tracheophytes
- Clade: Angiosperms
- Clade: Eudicots
- Clade: Rosids
- Order: Rosales
- Family: Rosaceae
- Genus: Prunus
- Subgenus: Prunus subg. Prunus
- Section: Prunus sect. Emplectocladus
- Species: P. eremophila

Binomial name
- Prunus eremophila Prigge

Species of flowering plant

Prunus eremophila, also known by its common name Mojave Desert plum, is a rare species of plum native to California.

== Description ==
Prunus eremophila is a bulky shrub with tangled, thorny branches. It can reach over 2 meters (6 1/2 feet) in maximum height. The deciduous leaves have toothed, pointed, oval blades up to 2 or 3 centimeters (3/4 or 1 1/4 inches) long. They are lightly hairy in texture.

It blooms in March to April. The flowers occur singly or in pairs, each bearing small white petals. Either the stamens or pistils abort, leaving female or male flowers. The fruit is orange-rust or a yellowish, fuzzy drupe up to 1.6 cm (3/4 in) wide, with a thin, dry pulp.

== Taxonomy ==
The plant was described to science only in 2001 or 2002.

== Distribution and habitat ==
The shrub is endemic to the Mojave Desert within northeastern San Bernardino County, California, where it is known only from the Vontrigger Hills and Lanfair Valley of the eastern Mojave National Preserve.

The species occurs in desert scrub habitat. Little is known about its ecology.

== Conservation ==
The plant occurs in the Mojave National Preserve, so is protected from some human activity, but is a Critically Endangered species threatened by off-road vehicles, grazing, mining, and climate change.
