= Prunus havardii =

Conservation status
- Data Deficient (IUCN 3.1)

Scientific classification
- Kingdom: Plantae
- Clade: Embryophytes
- Clade: Tracheophytes
- Clade: Angiosperms
- Clade: Eudicots
- Clade: Rosids
- Order: Rosales
- Family: Rosaceae
- Genus: Prunus
- Subgenus: Prunus subg. Amygdalus
- Species: P. havardii

Binomial name
- Prunus havardii (W.Wight) S.C.Mason

Synonyms (Note: Frequently misspelled as Prunus harvardii)
- Amygdalus havardii W. Wight

Species of shrub

Prunus havardii, called Havard's wild almond or Havard's plum, is a rare North American species of shrub tree in the genus Prunus, part of the rose family.

The plant is about 1.5 metres (5 feet) tall. It has white flowers and stiff spiny branches.

The species is native to western Texas in the United States and to northern Chihuahua across the Río Grande in Mexico.
