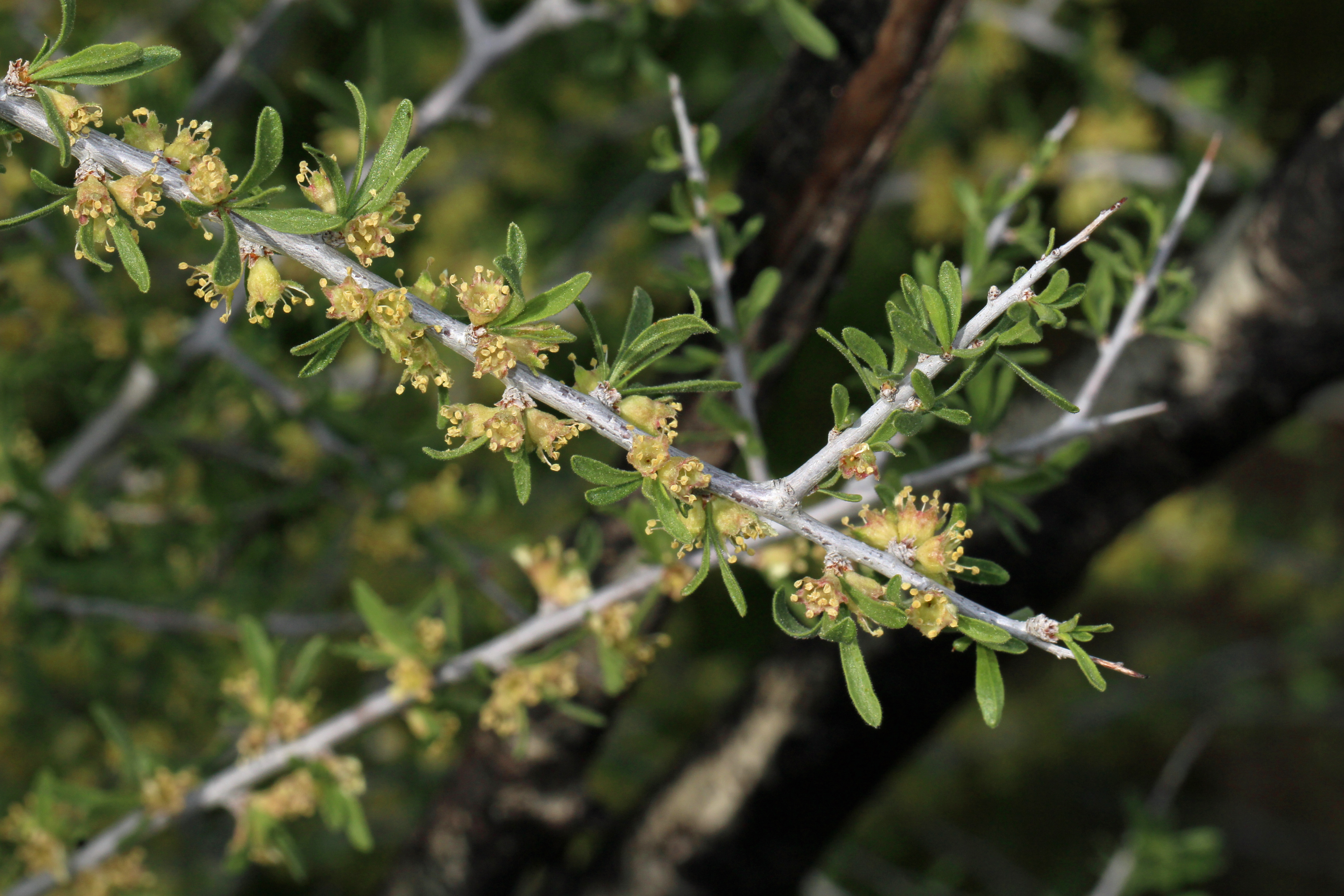

Scientific classification
- Kingdom: Plantae
- Clade: Embryophytes
- Clade: Tracheophytes
- Clade: Angiosperms
- Clade: Eudicots
- Clade: Rosids
- Order: Rosales
- Family: Rosaceae
- Genus: Prunus
- Subgenus: Prunus subg. Prunus
- Section: Prunus sect. Emplectocladus
- Species: P. fasciculata

Binomial name
- Prunus fasciculata (Torr.) A. Gray

Synonyms
- Emplectocladus fasciculata Torr.; Amygdalus fasciculata (Torr.) Greene

= Prunus fasciculata =

Species of tree

Prunus fasciculata, also known as wild almond, desert almond, or desert peach, is a spiny and woody shrub producing wild almonds that contain too much cyanide to be edible. The plant is native to western deserts of North America.

== Description ==
The perennial and deciduous plant grows up to 2 metres (6 1/2 feet) high, exceptionally to 3 metres (10 ft), with many horizontal (divaricate) branches, generally with thorns (spinescent), often in thickets. The bark is gray and without hairs (glabrous). The leaves are arranged on very short leaf stems (petioles) like bundles of needles (fascicles). They are 5–20 millimetres (1/4–3/4 inch) long, narrow (linear), with a broad, flattened tip and taper to a narrow base (spatulate, oblanceolate).

The sepals are hairless and without lobes or teeth. The flowers are small and white with 3-mm petals, either solitary or in fascicles and are without a petal stem (subsessile). The plants are dioecious. Male flowers have 10–15 stamens; females have one or more pistils. Numerous fragrant flowers appear from March to May. The drupe is about 1 centimetre (1/2 in) long, ovoid, light brown and pubescent with thin flesh.

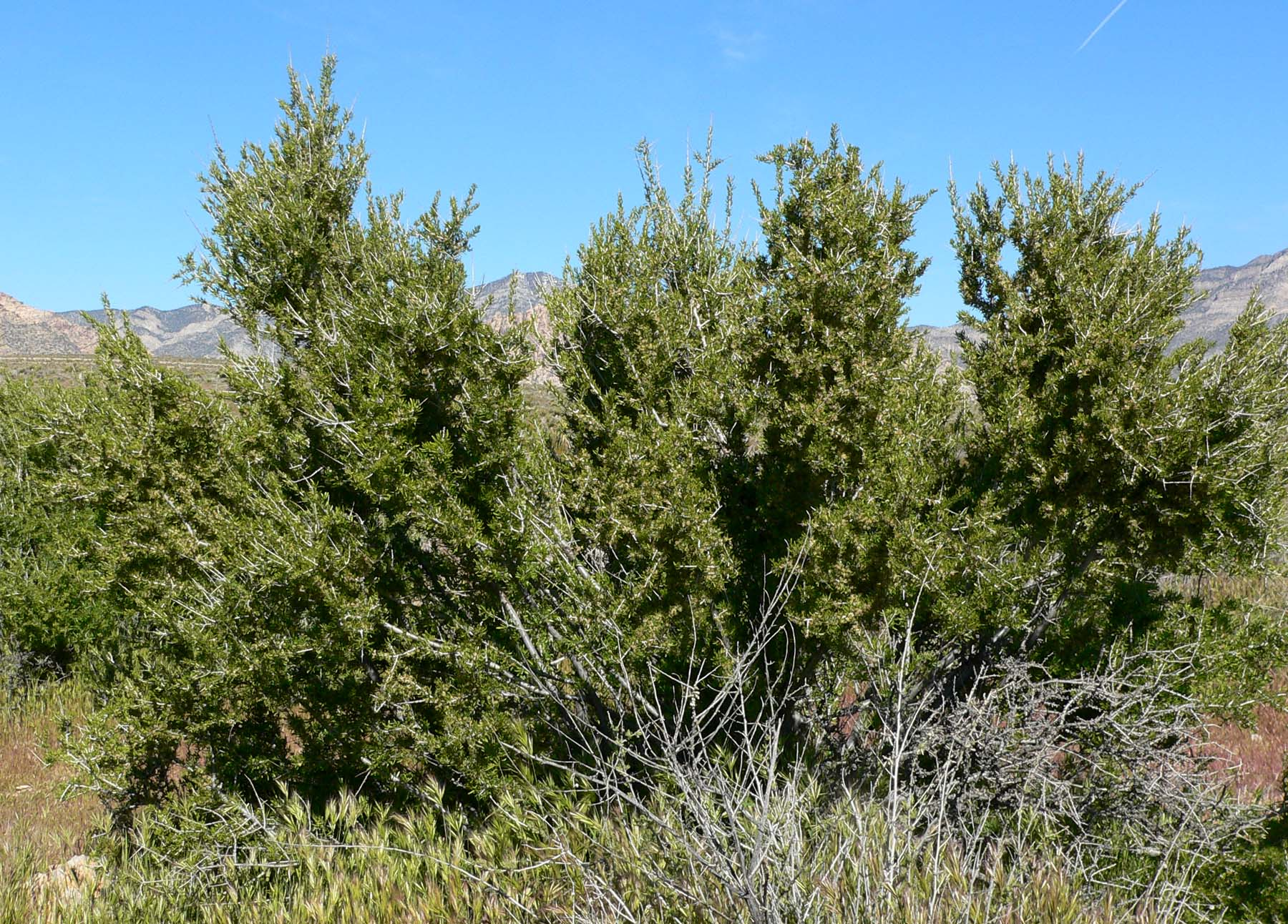
Red Rock Canyon, Nevada

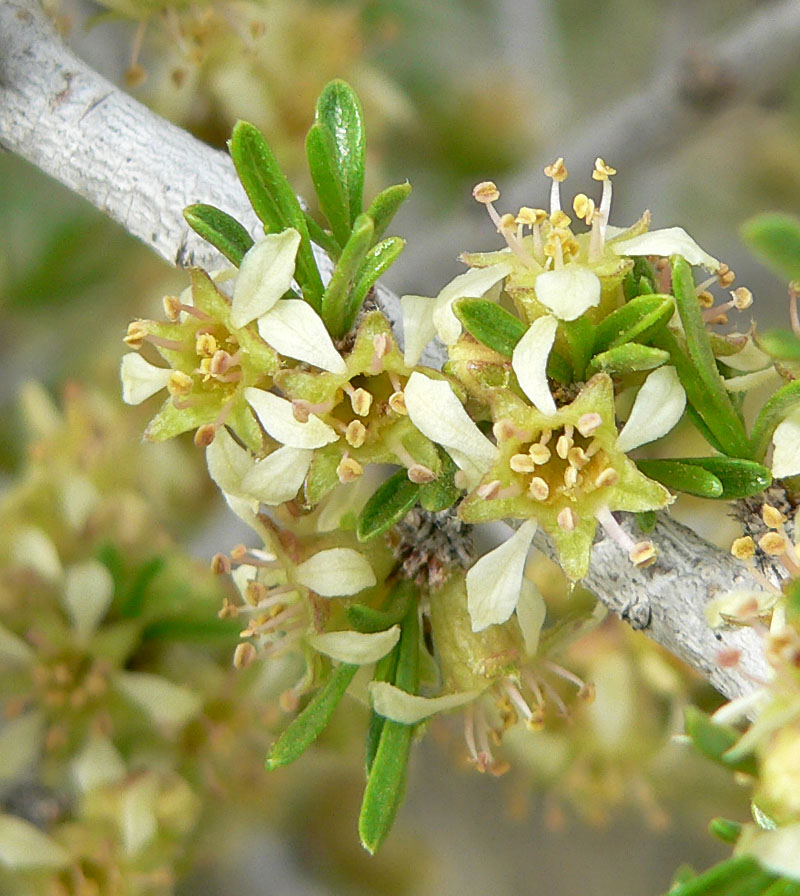
Leaves and male flowers close-up

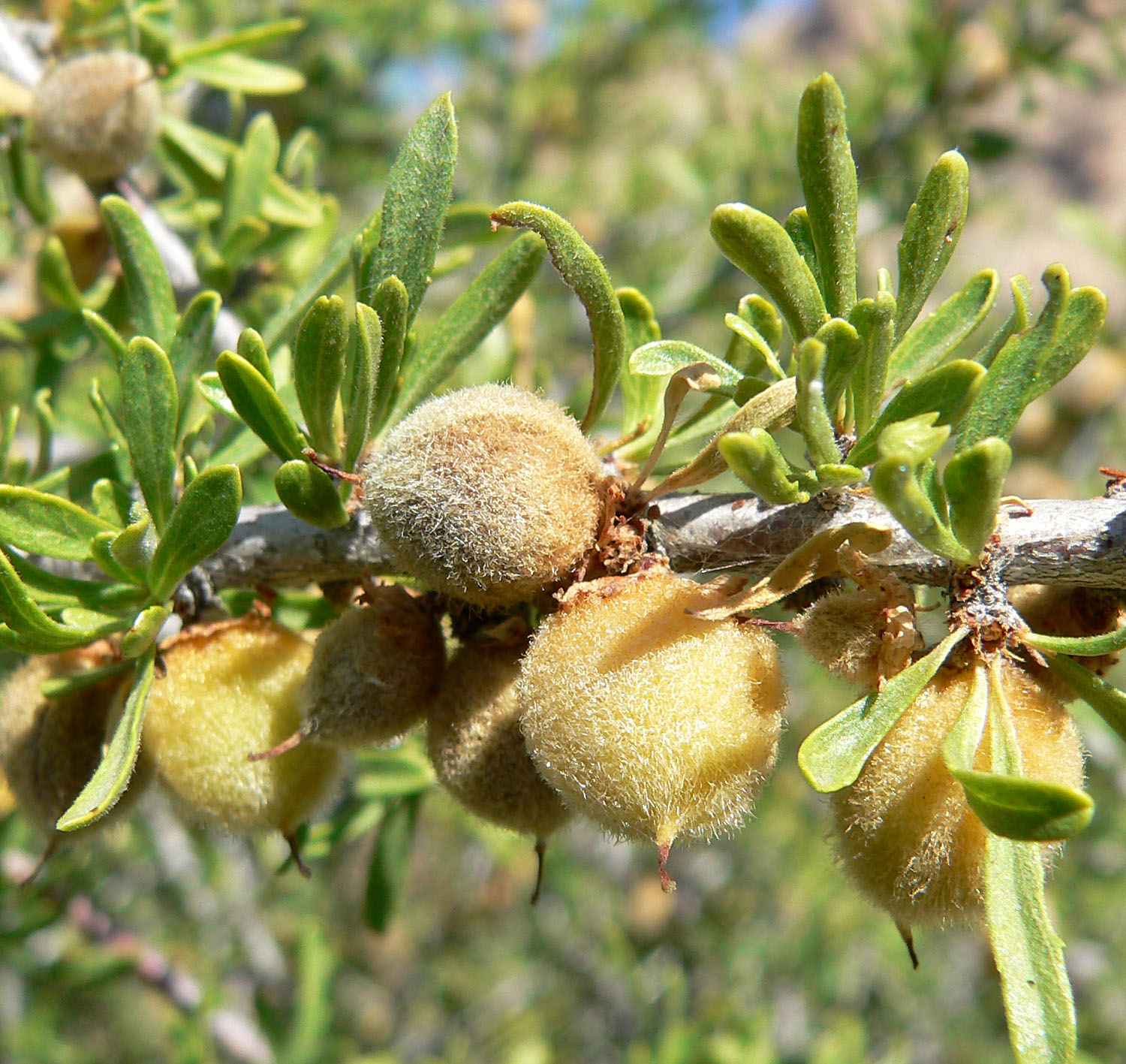
Infructescences

== Taxonomy ==
The plant was first classified as Emplectocladus fasciculata in an 1853 paper by John Torrey based on a collection of the plants of California acquired during the third expedition of John C. Fremont in 1845. The work was illustrated by Isaac Sprague. Torrey devised the genus Empectocladus to comprise a few desert shrubs. According to Silas C. Mason the genus has

... a top so densely branched, angled and interlocked as to well merit the name Emplectocladus (Greek, "woven branch"), signifying interlocked branches ...

According to George Bentham and Joseph Dalton Hooker the name fasciculata means that the leaves are in fascicles, or little bundles:

Leaves small, spatulate, as it were of precious stones, subglobose fasciculate

However, Asa Gray publishing in 1874 reclassified Empectocladus to Prunus resulting in the designation Prunus fasciculata (Torr.) A. Gray (subg. Emplectocladus), in which the desert shrubs become a subgenus. In 1996 Jepson defined a California variety with smooth leaves, punctata, in comparison to which Gray's specimens, with pubescent leaves, become the variety fasciculata. Prunus fasciculata var. punctata grows in the coastal ranges as well as in the desert.

=== Palaeobotanical evidence ===
Middens from rodent activities such as those of the pack rat are a rich source of plant macrofossils from late Pleistocene habitats. At Point of Rocks in Nevada, by 11,700 BP desert shrubs such as desert almond had replaced juniper and Joshua trees, indicating the onset of the modern desert. Somewhat earlier, 17,000–14,000 BP, desert almond flourished in a mixed desert and woodland ecology on the Colorado Plateau.

== Distribution and habitat ==
The species is native to the deserts of Arizona, California, Baja California, Nevada, and Utah. It prefers sandy or rocky soil on dry slopes and washes, usually below 7,000 feet (2,100 m) elevation.

== Uses ==
The plant is not cultivated. Some Native Americans in its limited range have traditional ways of using the outer portion of the fruit. The Kawaiisu found the tough twigs useful as drills in starting fires and as the front portion of arrow shafts. The seed contains too much cyanide to be edible, although there is some archaeological evidence that the ancient population of the Mojave Desert pounded the seeds into flour and leached it to make it edible.
