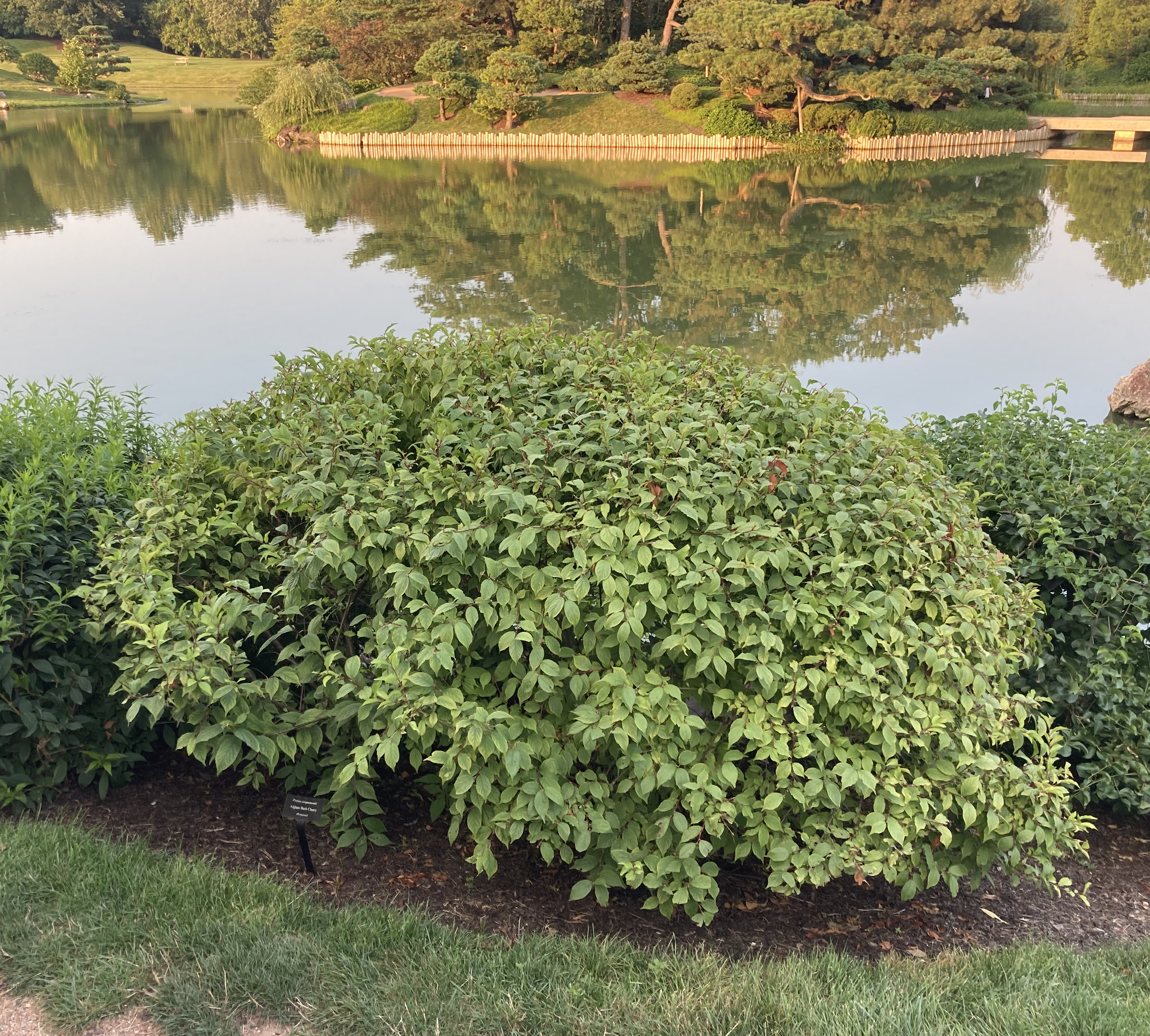

Conservation status
- Data Deficient (IUCN 3.1)

Scientific classification
- Kingdom: Plantae
- Clade: Tracheophytes
- Clade: Angiosperms
- Clade: Eudicots
- Clade: Rosids
- Order: Rosales
- Family: Rosaceae
- Genus: Prunus
- Subgenus: Prunus subg. Prunus
- Section: Prunus sect. Microcerasus
- Species: P. jacquemontii

Binomial name
- Prunus jacquemontii Hook. f.

= Prunus jacquemontii =

Species of flowering plant

Prunus jacquemontii, sometimes called Afghan cherry, Afghan bush cherry, Afghan dwarf cherry, or flowering almond, a name shared with Prunus triloba, is shrub which originates from Afghanistan, India, Pakistan, Tajikistan, and Tibet. The species name refers to French botanist Victor Jacquemont. It has slender leaves that are elliptical or obovate. The flowers are pink and grow in clusters of 2-3 blossoms with short petals.
