= Prunus microphylla =

Scientific classification
- Kingdom: Plantae
- Clade: Tracheophytes
- Clade: Angiosperms
- Clade: Eudicots
- Clade: Rosids
- Order: Rosales
- Family: Rosaceae
- Genus: Prunus
- Subgenus: Prunus subg. Prunus
- Section: Prunus sect. Emplectocladus
- Species: P. microphylla

Binomial name
- Prunus microphylla (Kunth) Hemsl.

Synonyms
- Amygdalus microphylla Kunth; Prunus apodantha Blake; Prunus microphylla (Kunth) A.Gray

Species of flowering plant

Prunus microphylla is a species of Prunus found in the semi-arid regions of Mexico, able to thrive in areas that receive only 300 to 500 mm of rain annually. Judging from its morphology, it is most closely related to Prunus minutiflora. As its specific epithet suggests, its leaves are quite small, only 1 to 1.5 cm long. It is a dense shrub reaching about 1 m, with small white flowers. It was first described by Kunth as Amygdalus microphylla from the collections made by Humboldt during his voyage to the Americas from 1799 to 1804.
