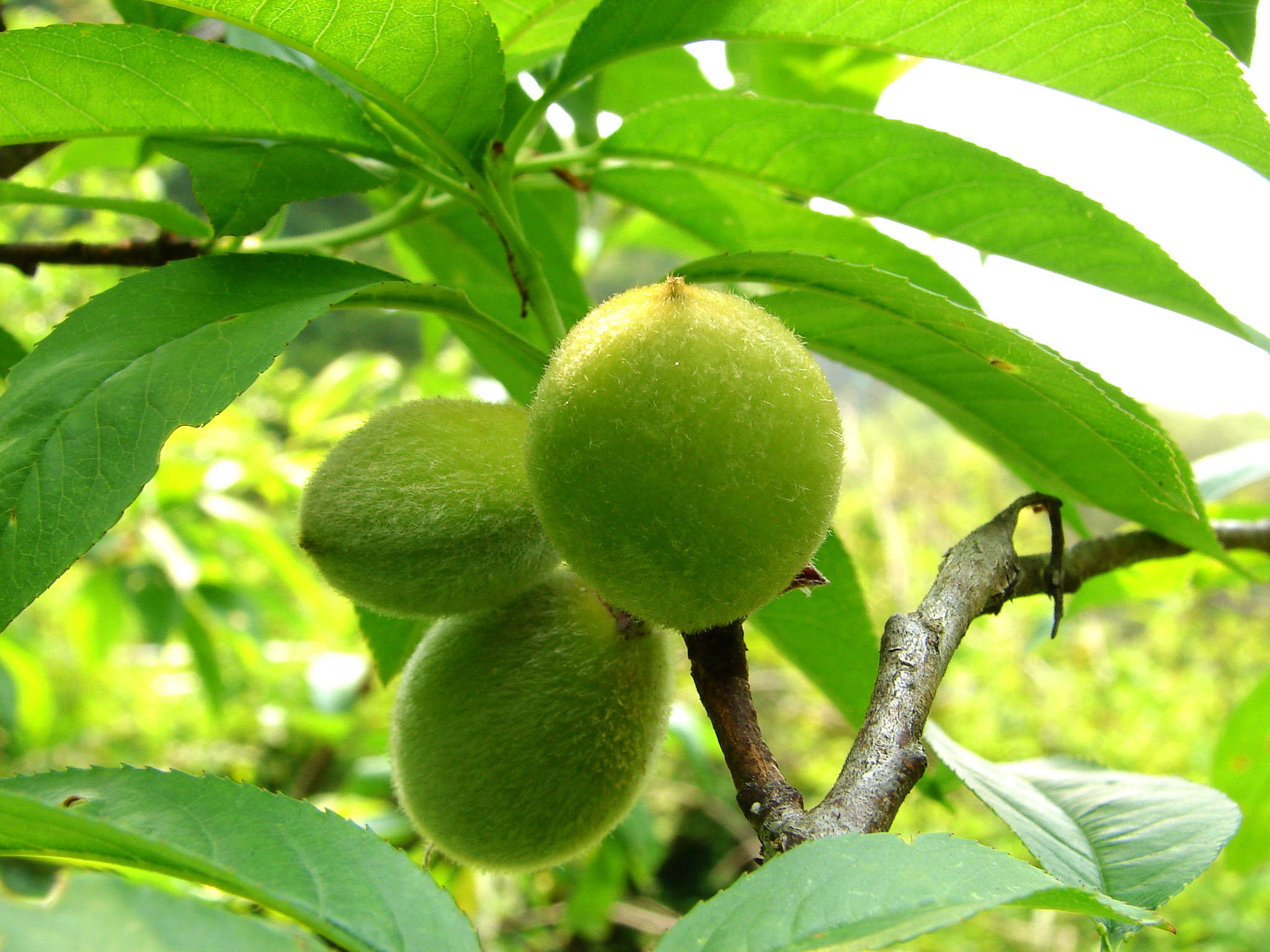

Conservation status
- Least Concern (IUCN 3.1)

Scientific classification
- Kingdom: Plantae
- Clade: Tracheophytes
- Clade: Angiosperms
- Clade: Eudicots
- Clade: Rosids
- Order: Rosales
- Family: Rosaceae
- Genus: Prunus
- Subgenus: Prunus subg. Prunus
- Species: P. davidiana

Binomial name
- Prunus davidiana (Carrière) Franch.

Synonyms
- Amygdalus davidiana (Carrière) de Vos ex L.Henry; Armeniaca davidiana (Carrière) Carrière; Persica davidiana Carrière

= Prunus davidiana =

Species of tree

Prunus davidiana is a plant species in the Rosaceae family. It is also known by the common names David's peach and Chinese wild peach. It is native to China, preferring to grow in forests and thickets, on slopes in mountain valleys, and in waste fields, from 800 to 3200 m. It is resistant to frost, and to a number of pests and diseases of cultivated peach, and is the subject of many studies for the genetic improvement of peaches.

== Description ==
Deciduous, upright tree.

- Height and Spread: Reaches a maximum height and spread of 9 m (30 ft) by 9 m (30 ft).
- Branches: Young branches whippy, upright, and smooth.
- Bark: smooth, dark purplish-red
- Leaves: Dark green, glabrous leaves are lanceolate-narrow ovate in shape, ranging in length from 5–12 cm (2–5 in). Leaf point is long and slender, tapering to a point; leaf margins finely toothed. Petioles are glandular.
- Inflorescences: Flowers in late winter-early spring or in February.
  - Flowers: 2.5 cm (1 in) wide and white to pale pink to rosy in color.
  - Pedicels: Very short.
- Fruit: Yellow, furry, edible.

== Cultivation ==
Fully hardy and prefers full sun. In China, it is largely used as an ornamental tree, and the fruit is eaten but not prized. In peach growing regions throughout the world, it is used as a source of rootstocks.

== Varieties ==
- P. davidiana var. alba has white flowers.
- P. davidiana var. rubra has deep rosy-colored flowers.

== Etymology ==
Prunus is the ancient Latin name for plum trees. Davidiana is named for L'Abbé Armand David (1826-1900), a missionary and collector of Chinese plants.
