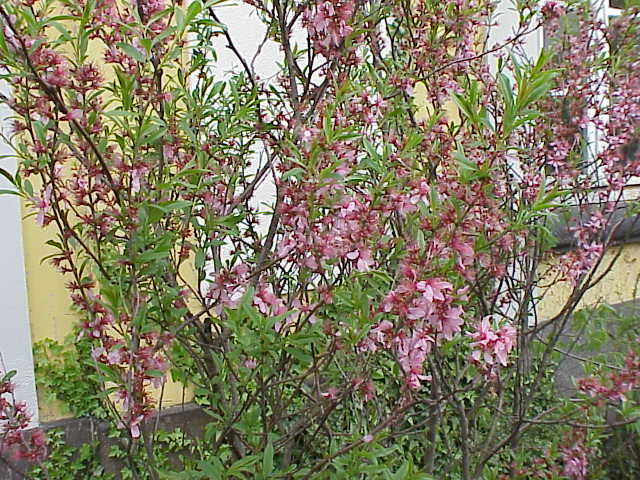

Conservation status
- Data Deficient (IUCN 3.1)

Scientific classification
- Kingdom: Plantae
- Clade: Tracheophytes
- Clade: Angiosperms
- Clade: Eudicots
- Clade: Rosids
- Order: Rosales
- Family: Rosaceae
- Genus: Prunus
- Subgenus: Prunus subg. Prunus
- Species: P. tenella

Binomial name
- Prunus tenella Batsch

Synonyms
- Amygdalus ledebouriana Schltdl.; Amygdalus georgica Desf.; Amygdalus nana L.; Prunus ledebouriana (Schltdl.) Y.Y.Yao; Prunus nana (L.) Stokes; Prunus georgica (Desf.) Eisenman

= Prunus tenella =

Species of shrub

Prunus tenella, the dwarf Russian almond, is a species of deciduous shrub in the genus Prunus, native to steppes of Eastern Europe and Western Siberia, as well as dry open sites of Caucasus, Western and Central Asia.

It yields small almond-like hairy fruits with characteristic flavor. It grows to 1.5 m (5 ft) and is a popular ornamental plant in cold temperate regions, valued for its profuse spring blossom and exceptional winter hardiness. It was formerly included in Prunus sect. Amygdalus, but molecular phylogenetic studies indicate it is closely related to bush cherries, apricots and plums, rather than almonds.

The Latin specific epithet tenella means "tender" or "delicate".

'Fire Hill' is a popular cultivar with red flowers.
