= Prunus mira =

Scientific classification
- Kingdom: Plantae
- Clade: Embryophytes
- Clade: Tracheophytes
- Clade: Spermatophytes
- Clade: Angiosperms
- Clade: Eudicots
- Clade: Rosids
- Order: Rosales
- Family: Rosaceae
- Genus: Prunus
- Species: P. mira

Binomial name
- Prunus mira Koehne

Synonyms
- Amygdalus mira K.Koch; Amygdalus mira (Koehne) T.T.Yu & L.T.Lu; Amygdalus mira (Koehne) Ricker; Persica mira (Koehne) Kov. & Kost.

Species of plant

Prunus mira, the smooth stone peach, smooth-pit peach or Tibetan peach, and locally called behmi, behimi or tirul, is a species of Prunus native to the foothills of the Himalayas and the Tibetan plateau, at elevations typically between 2,600 m (8,500 ft) and 3,000 m (9,800 ft), but ranging from 2,000 m (6,600 ft) to 4,000 m (13,000 ft).

== Description ==
Prunus mira grows to 8–12 m (26–39 ft) tall and the trunks 16 cm (6.3 in) in diameter (DBH). The leaves are lanceolate, 5–10 cm (2.0–3.9 in) long and 1.2–4 cm (0.47–1.57 in) wide. The flowers are pinkish white. The 2 by 3 cm (0.79 by 1.18 in) ovoid fruit has white flesh. As the common name suggests, the stone is smooth.

== Uses ==
The trees are cultivated in some parts of their native range, for their fruit (which is often pickled), their seeds (as a substitute for almonds), and for their seed oil, which is used for cooking and hair oil. The rootstocks are used for almonds and for dwarfing peach trees, and are resistant to powdery mildew.
