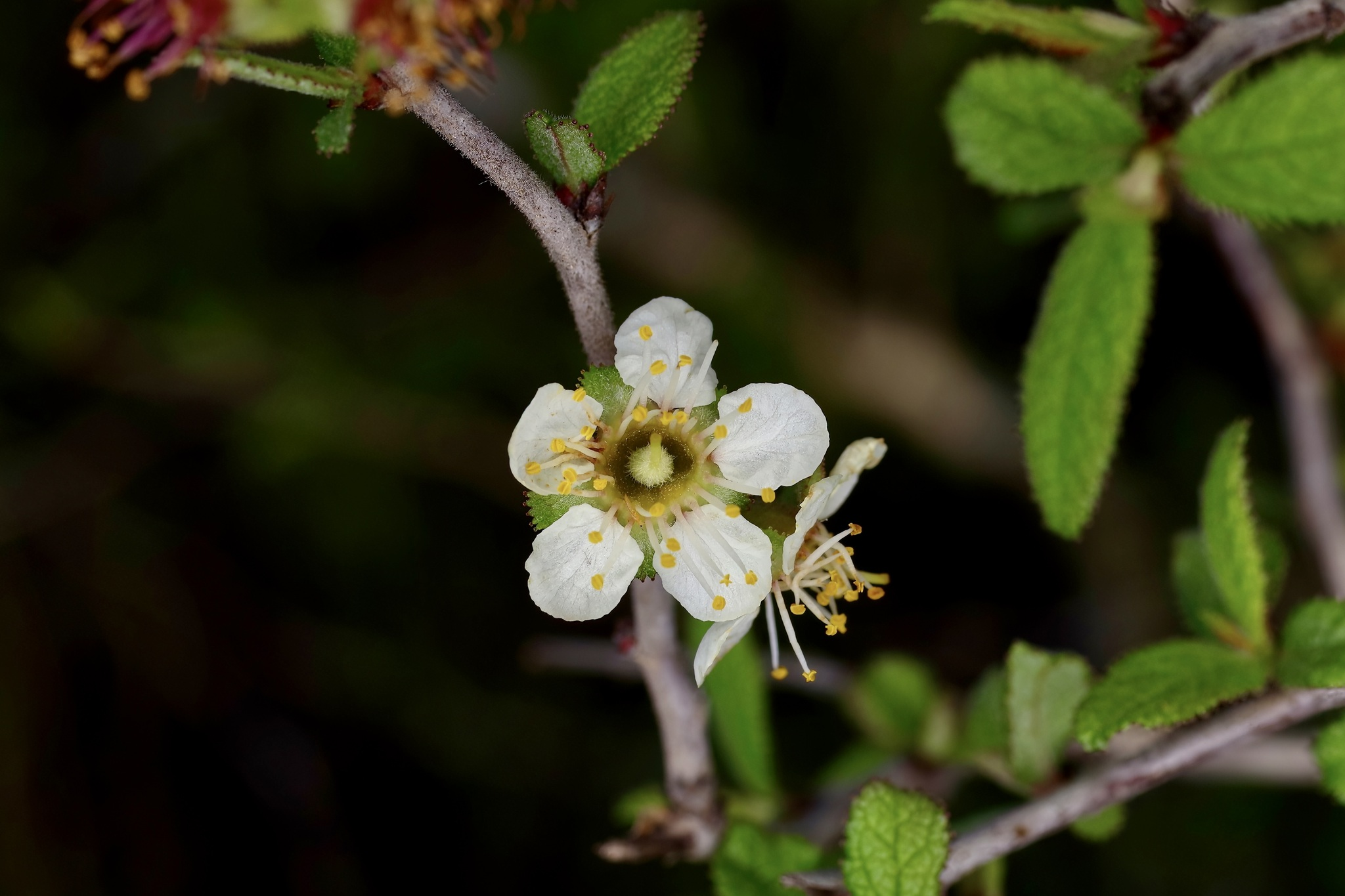

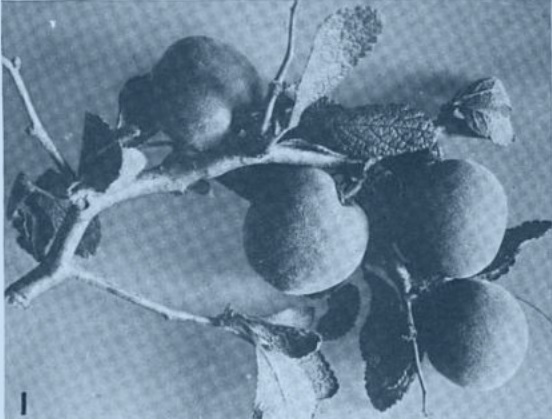
- Prunus texana fruit, branches, and leaves

Conservation status
- Near Threatened (IUCN 3.1)

Scientific classification
- Kingdom: Plantae
- Clade: Tracheophytes
- Clade: Angiosperms
- Clade: Eudicots
- Clade: Rosids
- Order: Rosales
- Family: Rosaceae
- Genus: Prunus
- Section: Prunus sect. Prunocerasus
- Species: P. texana

Binomial name
- Prunus texana D.Dietr.

Synonyms
- Amygdalus glandulosa Hook.; Amygdalus texana (D.Dietr.) W.Wight

= Prunus texana =

Species of tree

Prunus texana, called peachbush, Texas almond cherry, Texas peachbush, sand plum, peach bush, duraznillo and wild peach is native to central and western Texas. Although it looks like peach, it actually belongs to Prunus sect. Prunocerasus together with other North American plum species.

== Description ==
P. texana is a bushy shrub about 1 metre (3 feet 3 inches) tall and 0.5–1.5 m (1 1/2–5 ft) wide. The branches have short hairs. The flowers are white or pink. Blossoms appear in February and March and are 1–1.5 centimetres (3/8–5/8 inch). The fruits are egg-shaped and yellow or greenish yellow. The leaves are slender and elliptical with small teeth. The species readily hybridizes with native and cultivated plums.

Cultivars include 'Bolen', 'Gephart', 'Johnson', and 'Stuart'.
