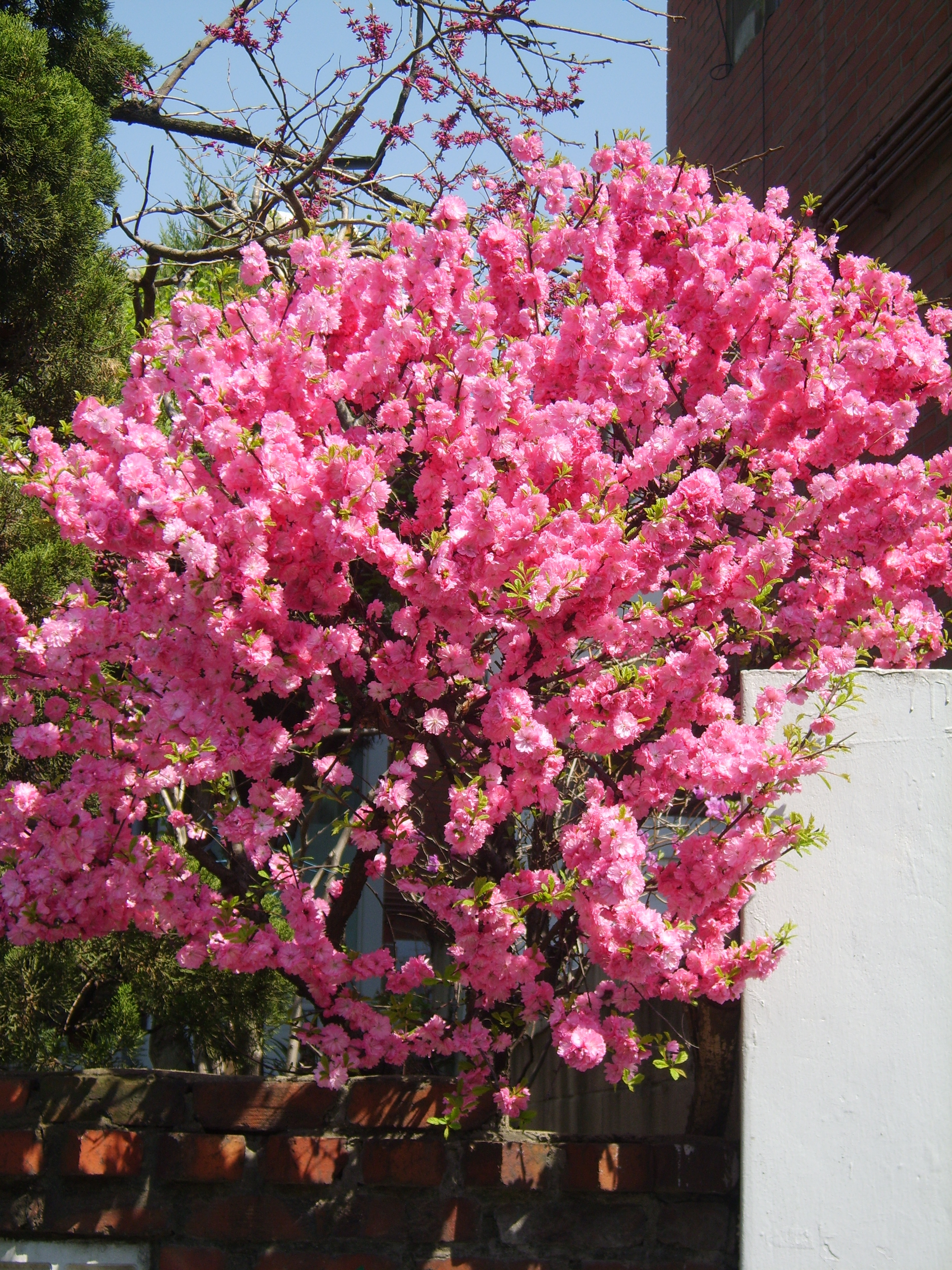

Scientific classification
- Kingdom: Plantae
- Clade: Tracheophytes
- Clade: Angiosperms
- Clade: Eudicots
- Clade: Rosids
- Order: Rosales
- Family: Rosaceae
- Genus: Prunus
- Subgenus: Prunus subg. Prunus
- Section: Prunus sect. Louiseania
- Species: P. triloba

Binomial name
- Prunus triloba Lindl.

Synonyms
- List: Amygdalopsis lindleyi Carrière; Amygdalus pedunculata Bunge; Amygdalus petzoldii (K.Koch) Ricker; Amygdalus triloba (Lindl.) Ricker; Amygdalus triloba var. plena (Dippel) S.Q.Nie; Amygdalus triloba var. truncata (Kom.) S.Q.Nie; Cerasus triloba (Lindl.) A.I.Baranov & Liou; Louiseania triloba (Lindl.) Pachom.; Persica triloba (Lindl.) Drobow; Prunopsis lindleyi (Carrière) André; Prunus petzoldii K.Koch; Prunus triloba f. petzoldii (K.Koch) Q.L.Wang

= Prunus triloba =

Species of tree

Prunus triloba, sometimes called flowering plum or flowering almond, a name shared with Prunus jacquemontii, is a shrubby cherry, sometimes becoming a small tree. The flowers are pale pink or white, and the fruit are red and "pubescent", i.e. with soft hair. It originates from China but is popular around the world as an ornamental.

It is most often found in cultivation in the double flowered form P. triloba 'Multiplex', which has double pink flowers. This cultivar is often sold as "Rose Tree of China", "China Rose Tree", or other variants.

The stones of P. triloba are often used to make beaded bracelets in China.
