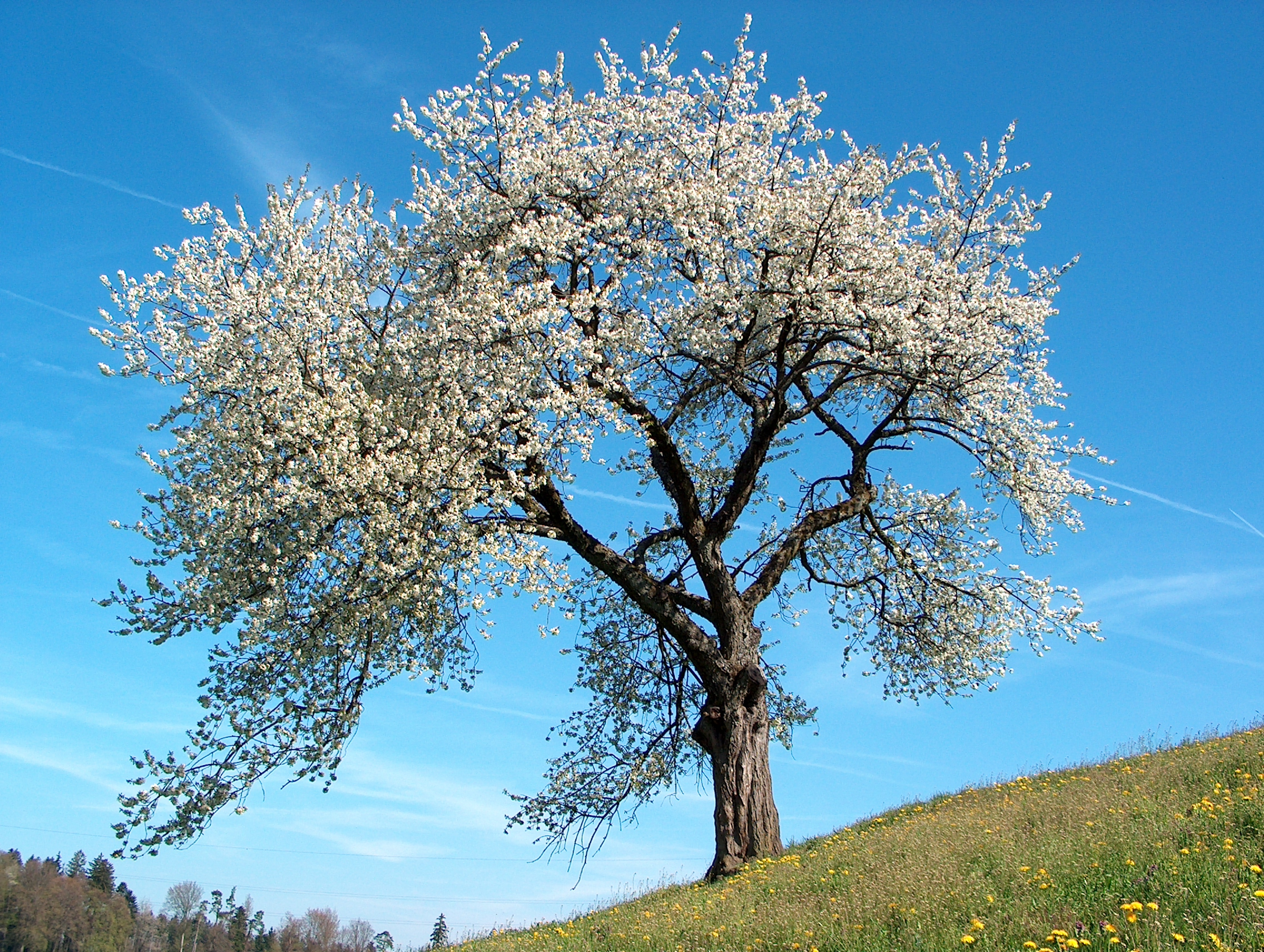
- Prunus cerasus (sour cherry) in bloom

Scientific classification
- Kingdom: Plantae
- Clade: Tracheophytes
- Clade: Angiosperms
- Clade: Eudicots
- Clade: Rosids
- Order: Rosales
- Family: Rosaceae
- Subfamily: Amygdaloideae
- Tribe: Amygdaleae
- Genus: Prunus; L.

Type species
- P. domestica L.

Synonyms
- Amygdalopersica Daniel; Amygdalophora M.Roem.; Amygdalopsis M.Roem.; Amygdalus L.; Armeniaca Scop.; Cerapadus Buia; Ceraseidos Siebold & Zucc.; Cerasus Mill.; Emplectocladus Torr.; Lauro-cerasus Duhamel; Laurocerasus M.Roem.; Louiseania Carrière; Maddenia Hook.f. & Thomson; Padellus Vassilcz.; Padus Mill.; Persica Mill.; Pygeum Gaertn.

= Prunus =

Prunus Temporal range: Eocene - recent Possible Albian record

Genus of trees and shrubs

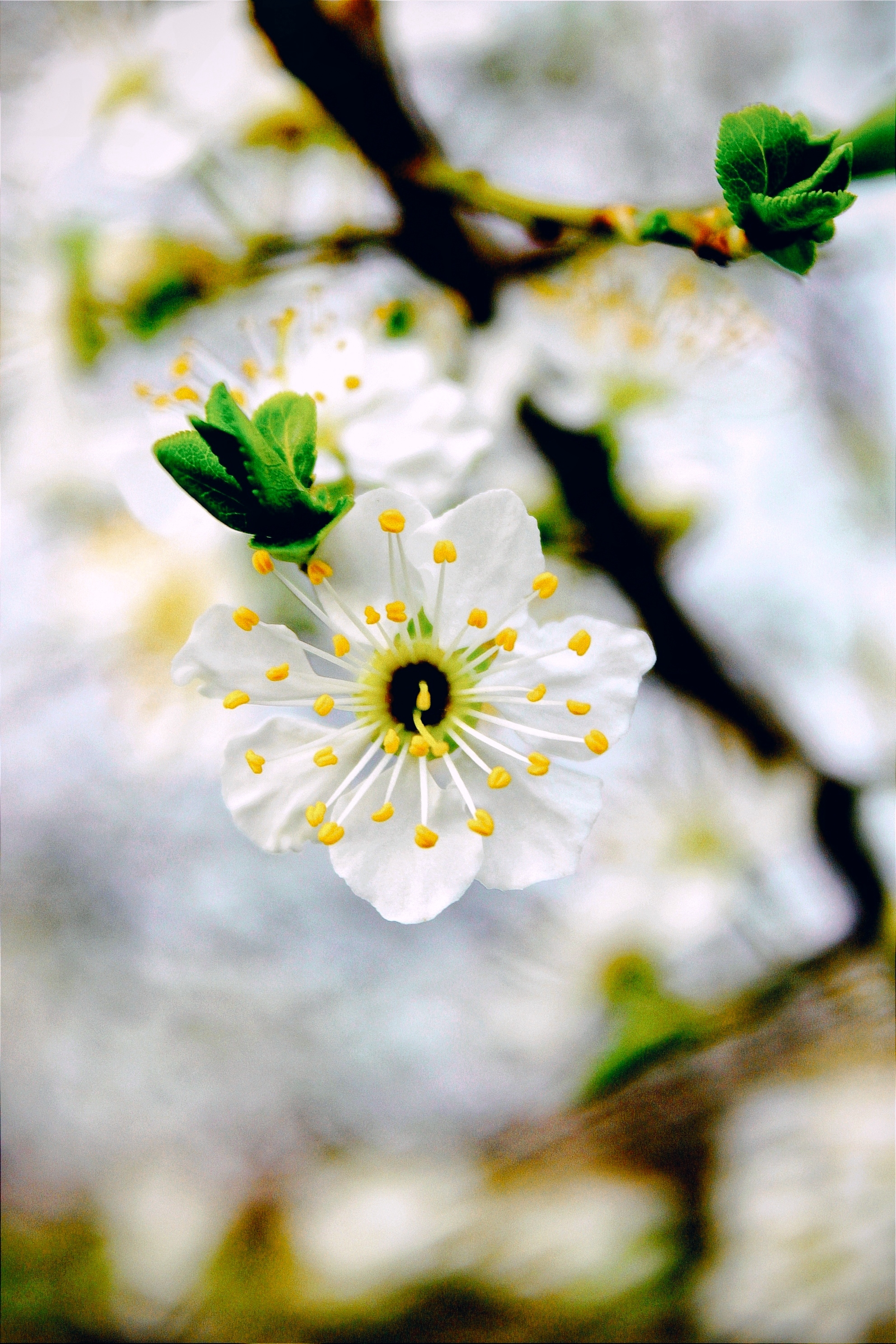
Prunus sp.

Prunus is a genus of flowering trees and shrubs from the rose family (Rosaceae) that produce stone fruits, or drupes. As of November 2026, the genus has about 359 accepted species including almonds, apricots, cherries, peaches (and nectarines), and plums. It has a cosmopolitan distribution, being native to the temperate regions of North America, the neotropics of South America, and temperate and tropical regions of Eurasia and Africa.

Many Prunus species are widely cultivated for their sweet, fleshy fruit, as well as for decorative purposes due to the colorful seasonal blossom of their flowers. Many species are cyanogenic, making certain parts of the plant toxic. The fleshy outer portion of the fruit can be eaten fresh, while the pit is edible in some species but poisonous in many others. Most Prunus fruit are also made into processed foods and beverages such as canned and dried fruit, juices (e.g. cherry and prune juice), jam, gelatine desserts, and roasted seeds.

== Description ==
Members of the genus are either deciduous or evergreen. A few species have spiny stems. The leaves are simple, alternate, usually lanceolate, unlobed, and often with nectaries on the leaf stalk along with stipules. The flowers are usually white to pink, sometimes red, with five petals and five sepals. Numerous stamens are present. Flowers are borne singly, or in umbels of two to six or sometimes more on racemes. The fruit is a fleshy drupe (a "prune") with a single relatively large, hard-coated seed (a "stone").

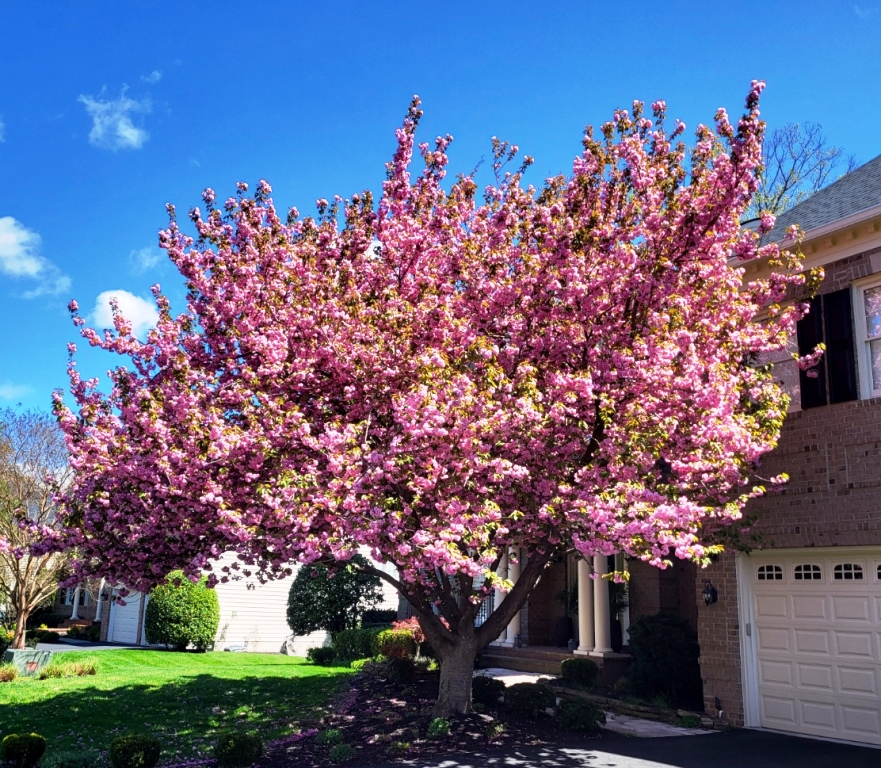
Prunus 'Kanzan' in bloom

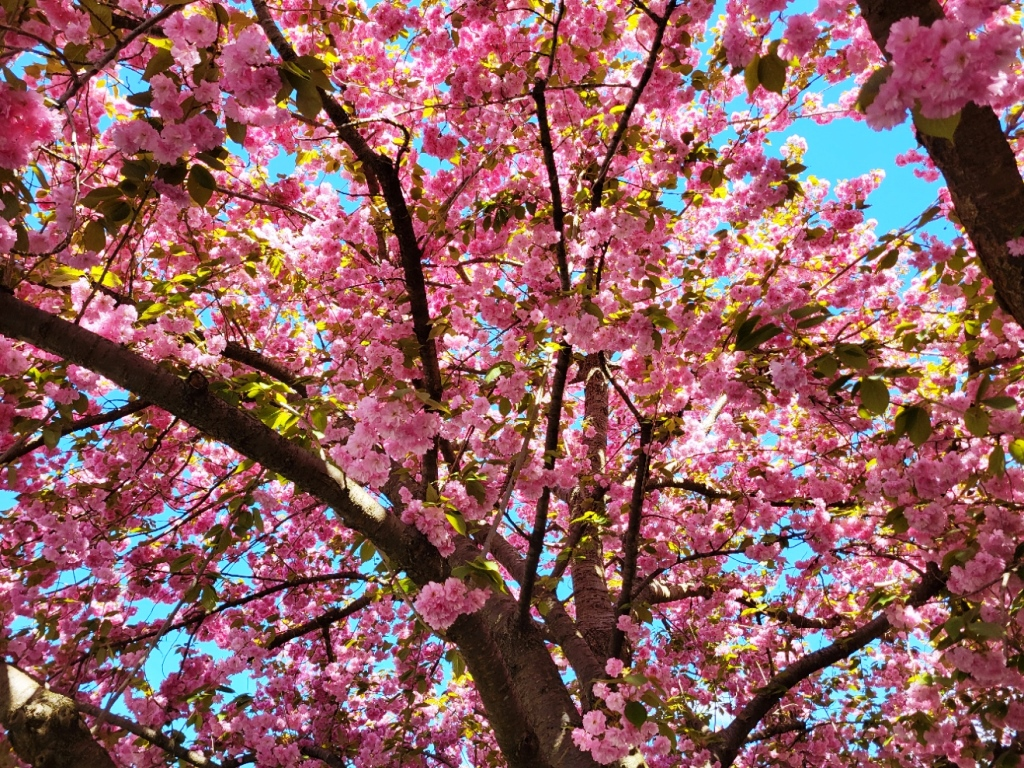
Inner canopy of Kanzan cherry in bloom

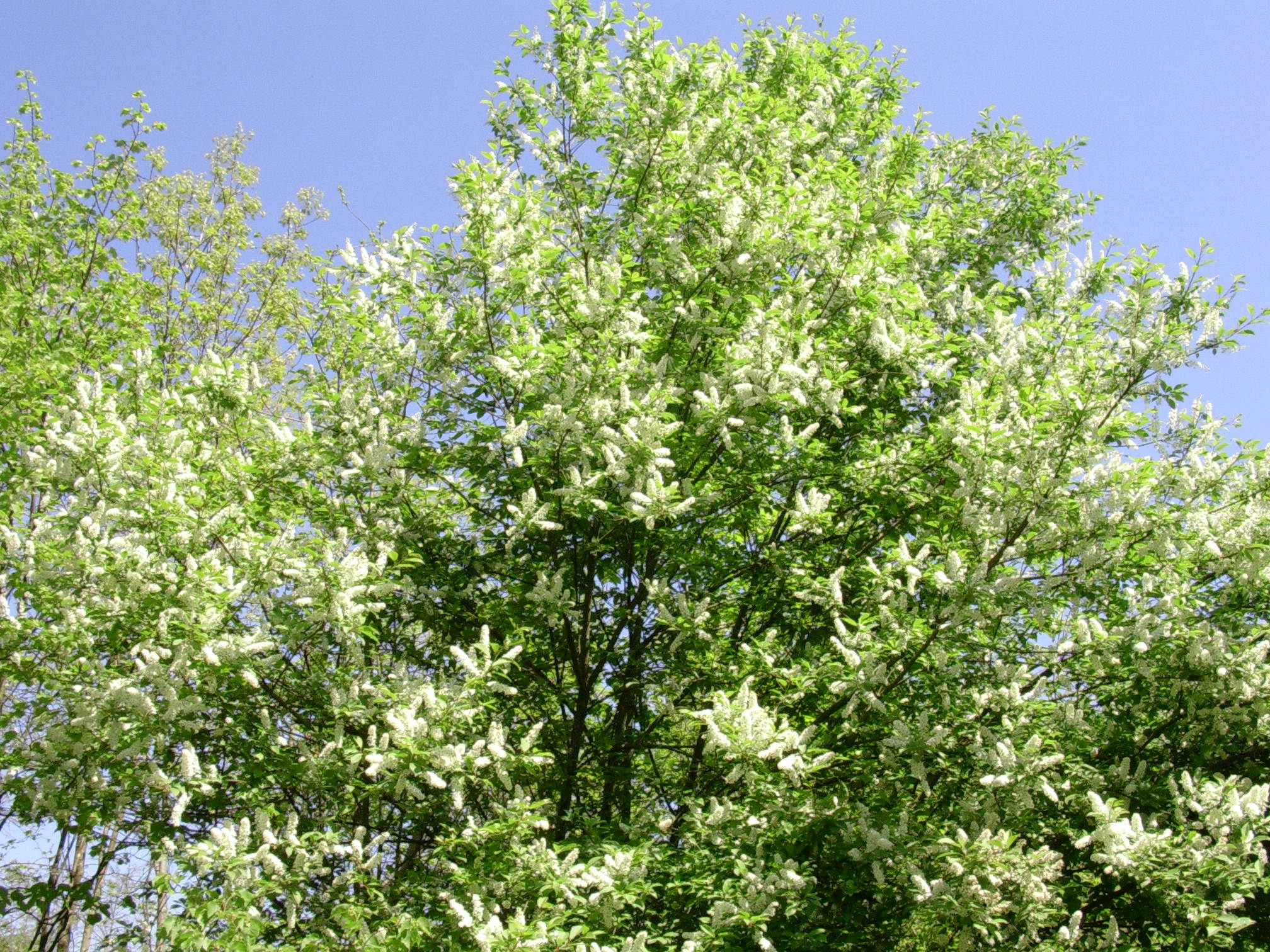
Black cherry (P. serotina) in bloom

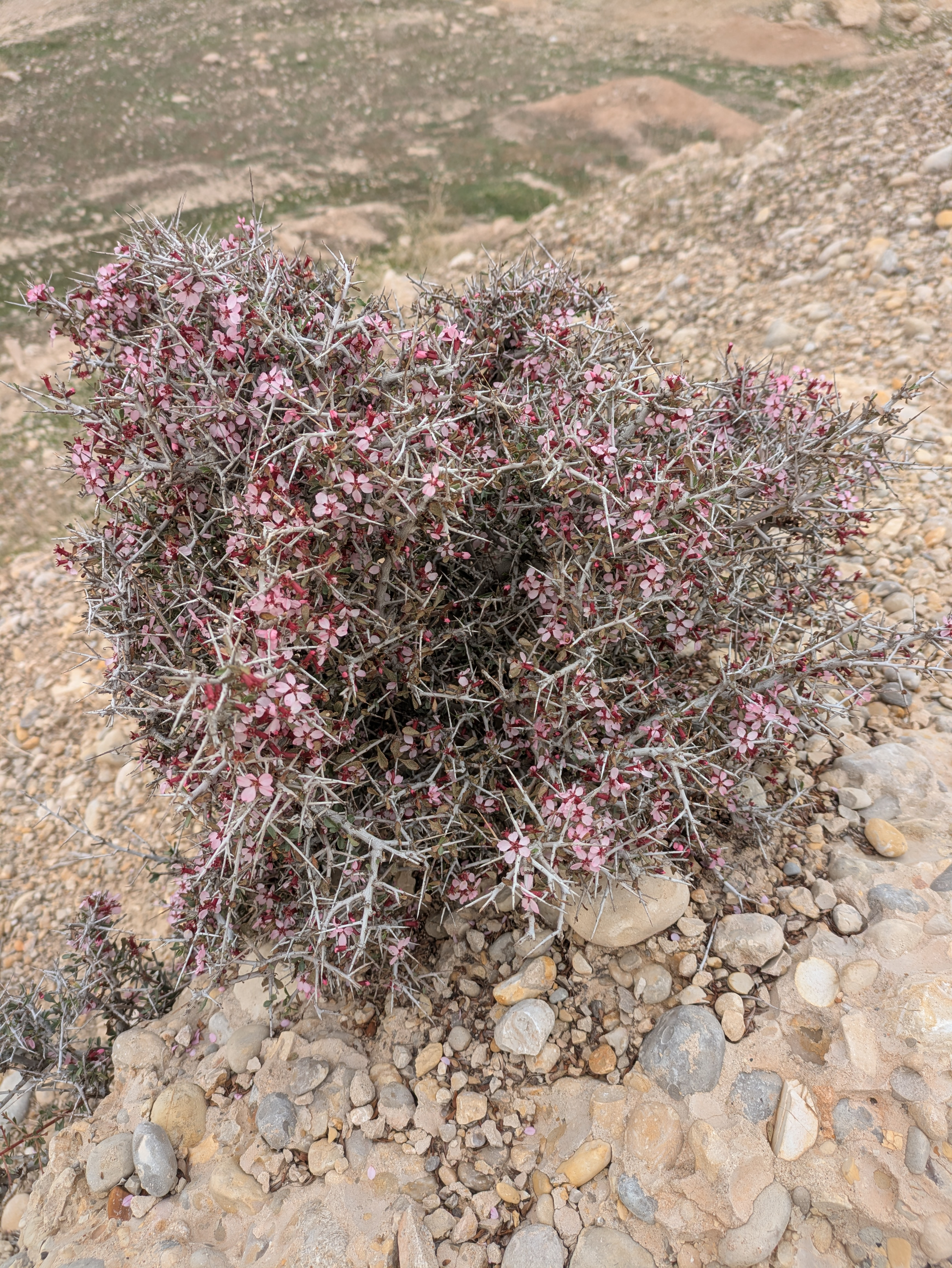
Prunus eburnea in Behbahan

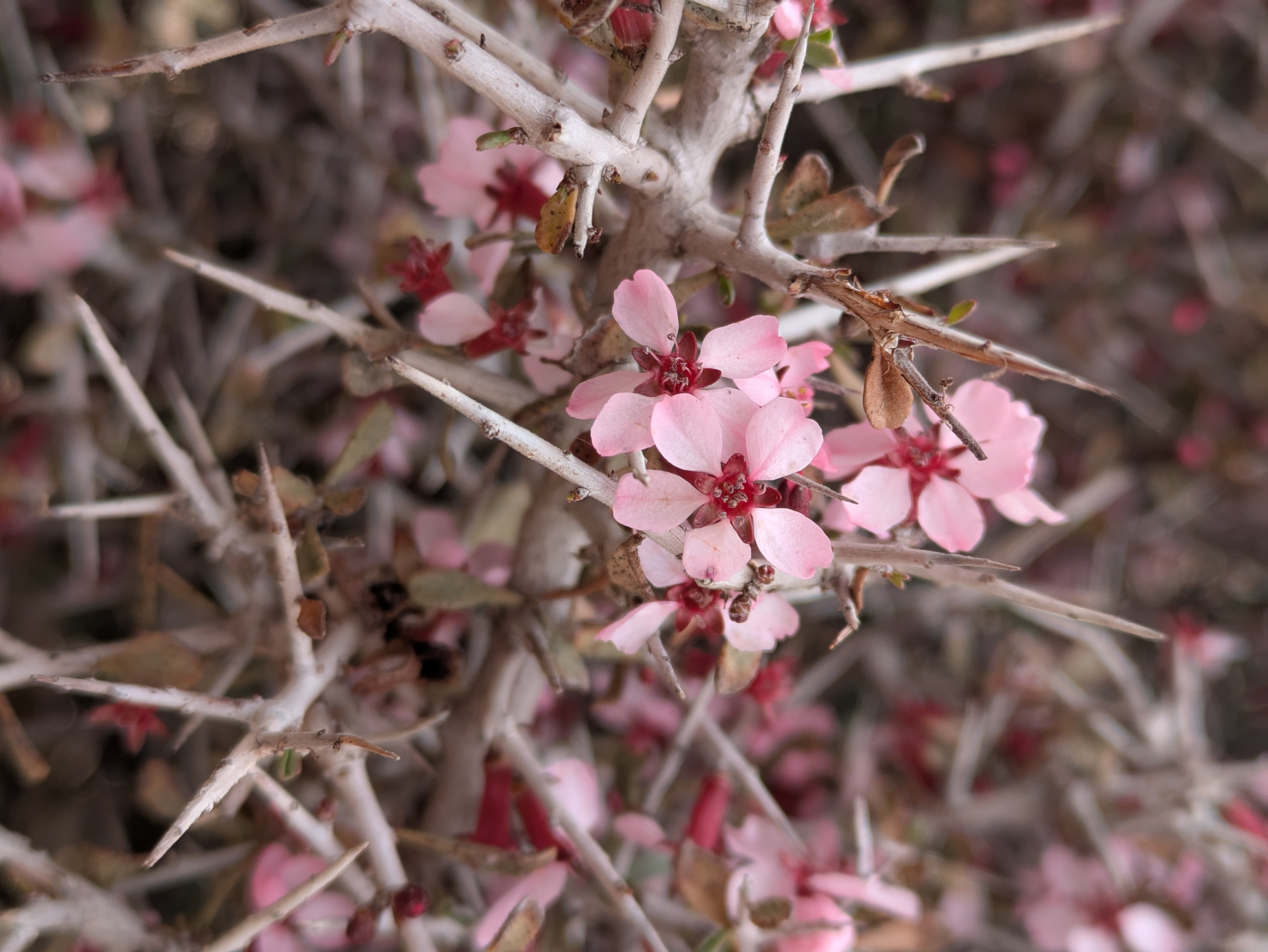
Prunus eburnea in Behbahan

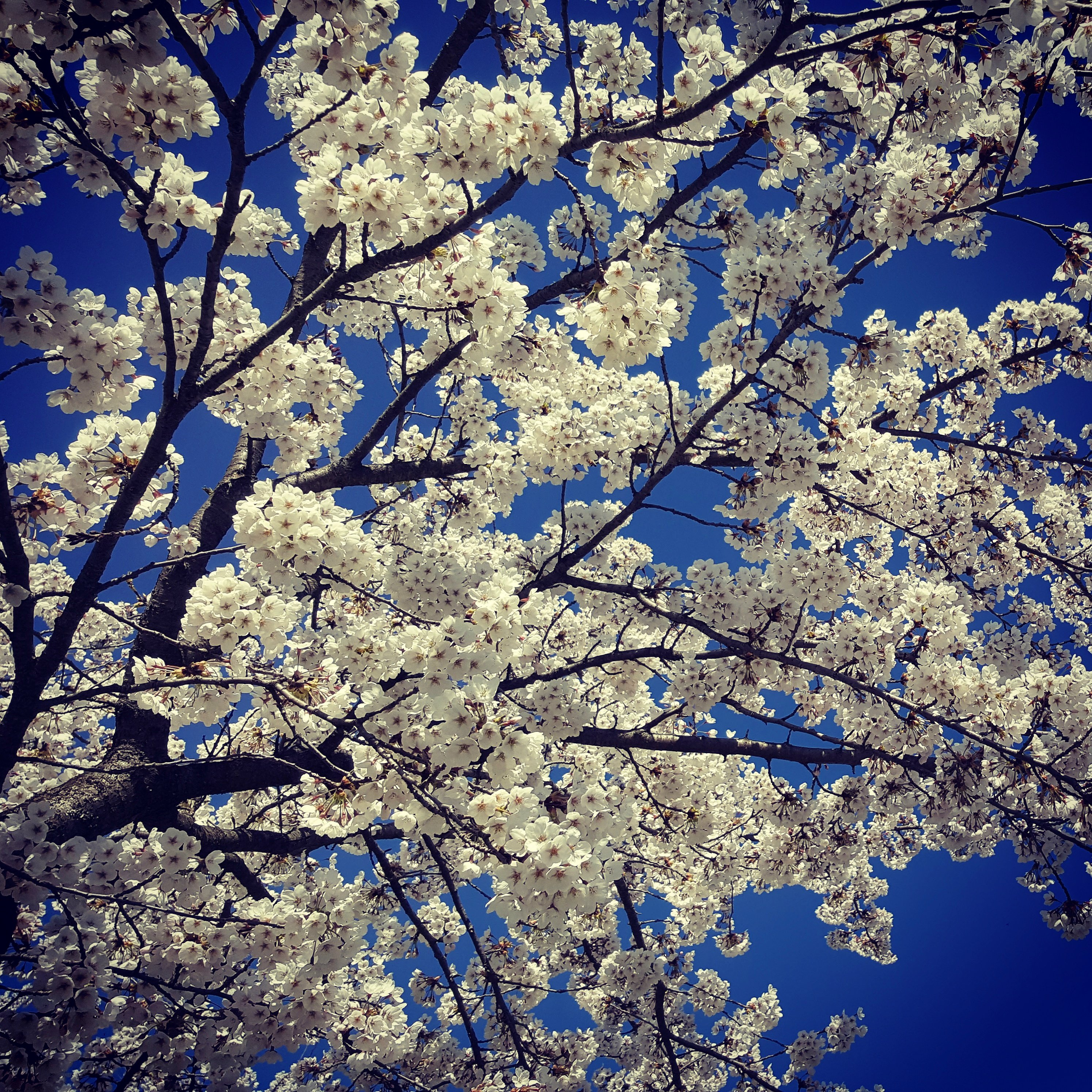
Japanese cherry (P. serrulata)

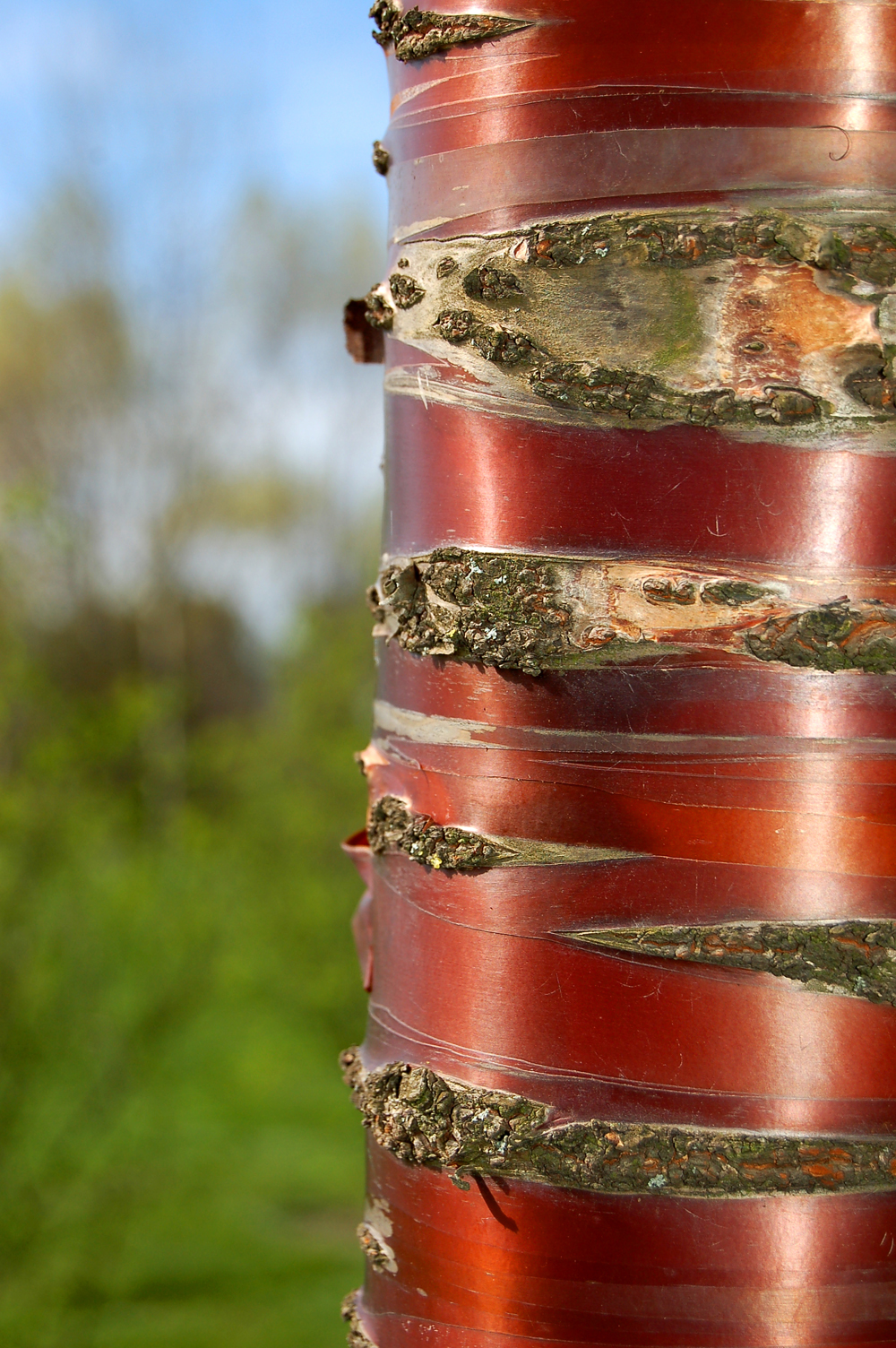
Tibetan cherry (P. serrula)

== Taxonomy ==
The modern taxon was traditionally classified as a subfamily of the rose family (Rosaceae), the Amygdaloideae (incorrectly "Prunoideae"), but was sometimes placed in its own family, the Prunaceae (or Amygdalaceae). More recently, Prunus is thought to have evolved from within a much larger clade now called subfamily Amygdaloideae (incorrectly "Spiraeoideae").

=== Classification ===
==== Evolutionary history ====
The oldest fossils confirmed to belong to Prunus date to the Eocene, and are found across the Northern Hemisphere. Older potential Late Cretaceous records are unconfirmed.

The earliest known fossil Prunus specimens are wood, drupe, seed, and a leaf from the middle Eocene of the Princeton Chert of British Columbia, Canada. Using the known age as calibration data, a partial phylogeny of some of the Rosaceae from a number of nucleotide sequences was reconstructed. Prunus and its sister clade Maloideae (apple subfamily) has been suggested to have diverged 44.3 million years ago which is within the Lutetian, or older middle Eocene. (Note: A date of 76 mya is given for Rosaceae, which is within the late Cretaceous.) Stockey and Wehr state that "The Eocene was a time of rapid evolution and diversification in Angiosperm families such as the Rosaceae". The oldest fossil species is Prunus cathybrownae from the Klondike Mountain Formation.

The Princeton finds are among a large number of angiosperm fossils from the Okanagan Highlands dating to the late early and middle Eocene. Crataegus is found at three locations: the McAbee Fossil Beds, British Columbia; the Klondike Mountain Formation around Republic, Washington, and the Allenby Formation around Princeton, British Columbia, while Prunus is found at those locations plus the Coldwater Beds of Quilchena, British Columbia and Chu Chua Formation around Chu Chua, British Columbia. A review of research on the Eocene Okanagan Highlands reported that the Rosaceae were more diverse at higher altitudes. The Okanagan highlands formations date to as early as 52 million years ago (mya), but the (approximate) 44.3 mya date might still apply. The authors state that "the McAbee flora records a diverse early middle Eocene angiosperm-dominated forest."

==== Linnean classification ====
In 1737, Carl Linnaeus used four genera to include the species of modern Prunus—Amygdalus, Cerasus, Prunus, and Padus—but simplified it to Amygdalus and Prunus in 1758. Since then, the various genera of Linnaeus and others have become subgenera and sections, as all the species clearly are more closely related. Liberty Hyde Bailey said: "The numerous forms grade into each other so imperceptibly and inextricably that the genus cannot be readily broken up into species."

==== Traditional classification ====
Historical treatments break the genus into several different genera, but this segregation is not currently widely recognised other than at the subgeneric rank. The ITIS recognises just the single genus Prunus, with an open list of species, (Note: Do a search in the ITIS database on the scientific name Prunus for its current list.) all of which are given at List of Prunus species. (Note: Other species appear, as well, which for whatever reasons are not yet in ITIS.)

One treatment of the subgenera derives from the work of Alfred Rehder in 1940. Rehder hypothesized five subgenera: Amygdalus, Prunus, Cerasus, Padus, and Laurocerasus. To them C. Ingram added Lithocerasus. The six subgenera are described as follows:

- Subgenus Amygdalus, almonds and peaches: axillary buds in threes (vegetative bud central, two flower buds to sides); flowers in early spring, sessile or nearly so, not on leafed shoots; fruit with a groove along one side; stone deeply grooved; type species: Prunus amygdalus (almond)
- Subgenus Prunus, plums and apricots: axillary buds solitary; flowers in early spring stalked, not on leafed shoots; fruit with a groove along one side, stone rough; type species: Prunus domestica (plum)
- Subgenus Cerasus, true cherries: axillary buds single; flowers in early spring in corymbs, long-stalked, not on leafed shoots; fruit not grooved, stone smooth; type species: Prunus cerasus (sour cherry)
- Subgenus Lithocerasus, bush cherries: axillary buds in threes; flowers in early spring in corymbs, long-stalked, not on leafed shoots; fruit not grooved, stone smooth; type species: Prunus pumila (sand cherry)
- Subgenus Padus, bird cherries: axillary buds single; flowers in late spring in racemes on leafy shoots, short-stalked; fruit not grooved, stone smooth; type species: Prunus padus (European bird cherry), now known to be polyphyletic
- Subgenus Laurocerasus, cherry laurels: evergreen (all the other subgenera are deciduous); axillary buds single; flowers in early spring in racemes, not on leafed shoots, short-stalked; fruit not grooved, stone smooth; type species: Prunus laurocerasus (European cherry-laurel)

==== Phylogenetic classification ====
An extensive phylogenetic study based on different chloroplast and nuclear sequences divides Prunus into three subgenera:

- Subg. Padus: In addition to species of Padus (bird cherries), this subgenus also includes species of Maddenia (false bird cherries), Laurocerasus (cherry laurels) and Pygeum.
- Subg. Cerasus: This subgenus includes true cherries such as sweet cherry, sour cherry, mahaleb cherry and Japanese flowering cherry.
- Subg. Prunus: This subgenus includes the following sections:
  - Sect. Prunus: Old World plums
  - Sect. Prunocerasus: New World plums
  - Sect. Armeniaca: apricots
  - Sect. Microcerasus: bush cherries
  - Sect. Amygdalus: almonds
  - Sect. Persica: peaches
  - Sect. Emplectocladus: desert almonds

=== Species ===
The genus has about 340 accepted species (as of March 2024). The lists below are incomplete, but include most of the more commonly cultivated species.

==== Afro-Eurasian species ====
- P. africana – African cherry
- P. amygdalus – almond
- P. apetala – clove cherry
- P. armeniaca – apricot
- P. avium – sweet cherry or wild cherry
- P. brigantina – Briançon apricot
- P. buergeriana – dog cherry
- P. campanulata – Taiwan cherry
- P. canescens – gray-leaf cherry
- P. cerasifera – cherry plum
- P. cerasoides – wild Himalayan cherry
- P. cerasus – sour cherry
- P. ceylanica – Ceylon cherry
- P. cocomilia – Italian plum
- P. cornuta – Himalayan bird cherry
- P. davidiana – David's peach
- P. darvasica – Darvaz plum
- P. domestica – common plum
- P. fruticosa – European dwarf cherry
- P. glandulosa – Chinese bush cherry
- P. grayana – Japanese bird cherry
- P. incana – willow-leaf cherry
- P. incisa – Fuji cherry
- P. jacquemontii – Afghan bush cherry
- P. japonica – Japanese bush cherry
- P. laurocerasus – cherry laurel
- P. lusitanica – Portugal laurel
- P. maackii – Manchurian cherry
- P. mahaleb – Mahaleb cherry
- P. mandshurica – Manchurian apricot
- P. maximowiczii – Korean cherry
- P. mume – Chinese plum
- P. nipponica – Japanese alpine cherry
- P. padus – bird cherry
- P. persica – peach
- P. pseudocerasus – Chinese sour cherry
- P. prostrata – mountain cherry
- P. salicina – Japanese plum
- P. sargentii – north Japanese hill cherry
- P. scoparia – mountain almond
- P. serrula – Tibetan cherry
- P. serrulata – Japanese cherry
- P. sibirica – Siberian apricot
- P. simonii – apricot plum
- P. speciosa – Oshima cherry
- P. spinosa – blackthorn, sloe
- P. ssiori – Hokkaido bird cherry
- P. subhirtella – winter-flowering cherry
- P. tenella – dwarf Russian almond
- P. tomentosa – Nanking cherry
- P. triloba – flowering plum
- P. turneriana – almondbark
- P. ursina – Bear's plum
- P. × yedoensis – Yoshino cherry
- P. zippeliana – big-leaf cherry (Chinese: 大叶桂樱)

==== Species found in the Americas ====
- P. alabamensis – Alabama cherry
- P. alleghaniensis – Allegheny plum
- P. americana – American plum
- P. andersonii – desert peach
- P. angustifolia – Chickasaw plum
- P. brasiliensis – Brazilian cherry
- P. buxifolia – chuwacá
- P. caroliniana – Carolina laurelcherry
- P. cortapico
- P. emarginata – bitter cherry
- P. eremophila – Mojave Desert plum
- P. fasciculata – wild almond
- P. fremontii – desert apricot
- P. geniculata – scrub plum
- P. gentryi – Gentry cherry
- P. gracilis – Oklahoma plum
- P. havardii – Havard's plum
- P. hortulana – Hortulan plum
- P. huantensis
- P. ilicifolia – hollyleaf cherry
- P. integrifolia
- P. maritima – beach plum
- P. mexicana – Mexican plum
- P. minutiflora – Texas almond
- P. murrayana – Murray's plum
- P. myrtifolia – West Indies cherry
- P. nigra – Canada plum
- P. occidentalis – western cherry laurel
- P. pensylvanica – pin cherry
- P. pleuradenia – Antilles cherry
- P. pumila – sand cherry
- P. rigida
- P. rivularis – creek plum
- P. serotina – black cherry
- P. subcordata – Klamath plum
- P. subcorymbosa
- P. texana – peachbush
- P. umbellata – flatwoods plum
- P. virginiana – chokecherry

=== Etymology ===
The Online Etymology Dictionary presents the customary derivations of plum and prune from Latin prūnum, the plum fruit. The tree is prūnus; and Pliny uses prūnus silvestris to mean the blackthorn. The word is not native Latin, but is a loan from Greek προῦνον (prounon), which is a variant of προῦμνον (proumnon), origin unknown. The tree is προύμνη (proumnē). Most dictionaries follow Hoffman, Etymologisches Wörterbuch des Griechischen, in making some form of the word a loan from a pre-Greek language of Asia Minor, related to Phrygian.

The first use of Prunus as a genus name was by Carl Linnaeus in Hortus Cliffortianus of 1737, which went on to become Species Plantarum.

== Distribution and habitat ==
The genus has a cosmopolitan distribution, being native to the temperate regions of North America, the neotropics of South America, and temperate and tropical regions of Eurasia and Africa.

== Ecology ==
Prunus species are food plants for the larvae of many Lepidoptera species (butterflies and moths).

=== Pests and diseases ===
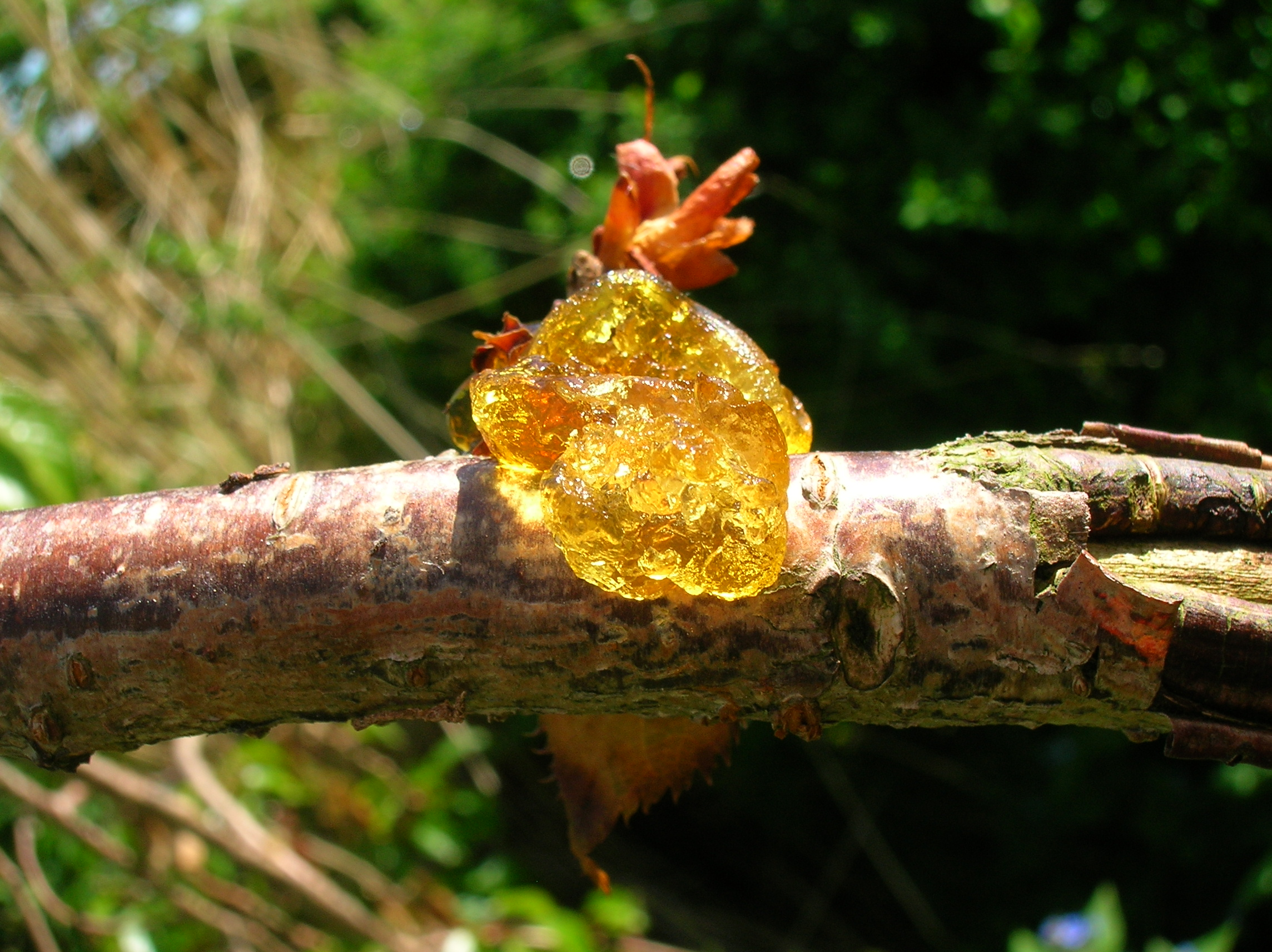
Cherries are prone to gummosis.

Various Prunus species are winter hosts of the Damson-hop aphid, Phorodon humuli, which is destructive to hops Humulus lupulus just at the time of their maturity, so plum trees should not be grown in the vicinity of hop fields.

Corking is the drying or withering of fruit tissue. In stone fruit, it is often caused by a lack of boron and/or calcium.

Gummosis is a nonspecific condition of stone fruits (peach, nectarine, plum, and cherry) in which gum is exuded and deposited on the bark of trees. Gum is produced in response to any type of wound – insect, mechanical injury, or disease.

Apiosporina morbosa is a major fungal disease in the Northern Americas, with many urban centres running black knot fungus management programs. This disease is best managed by physical removal of knot-bearing branches to prevent spore spread and immediate disposal of infected tissue. Chemical treatment is not largely effective, as trees can easily be re-infected by neighbouring knots.

Laetiporus gilbertsoni (commonly sulfur shelf and chicken of the woods), is a serious cubic brown rot parasite which attacks certain species of decorative red-leaf plum trees in the genus Prunus on the Pacific coast of North America.

== Cultivation ==
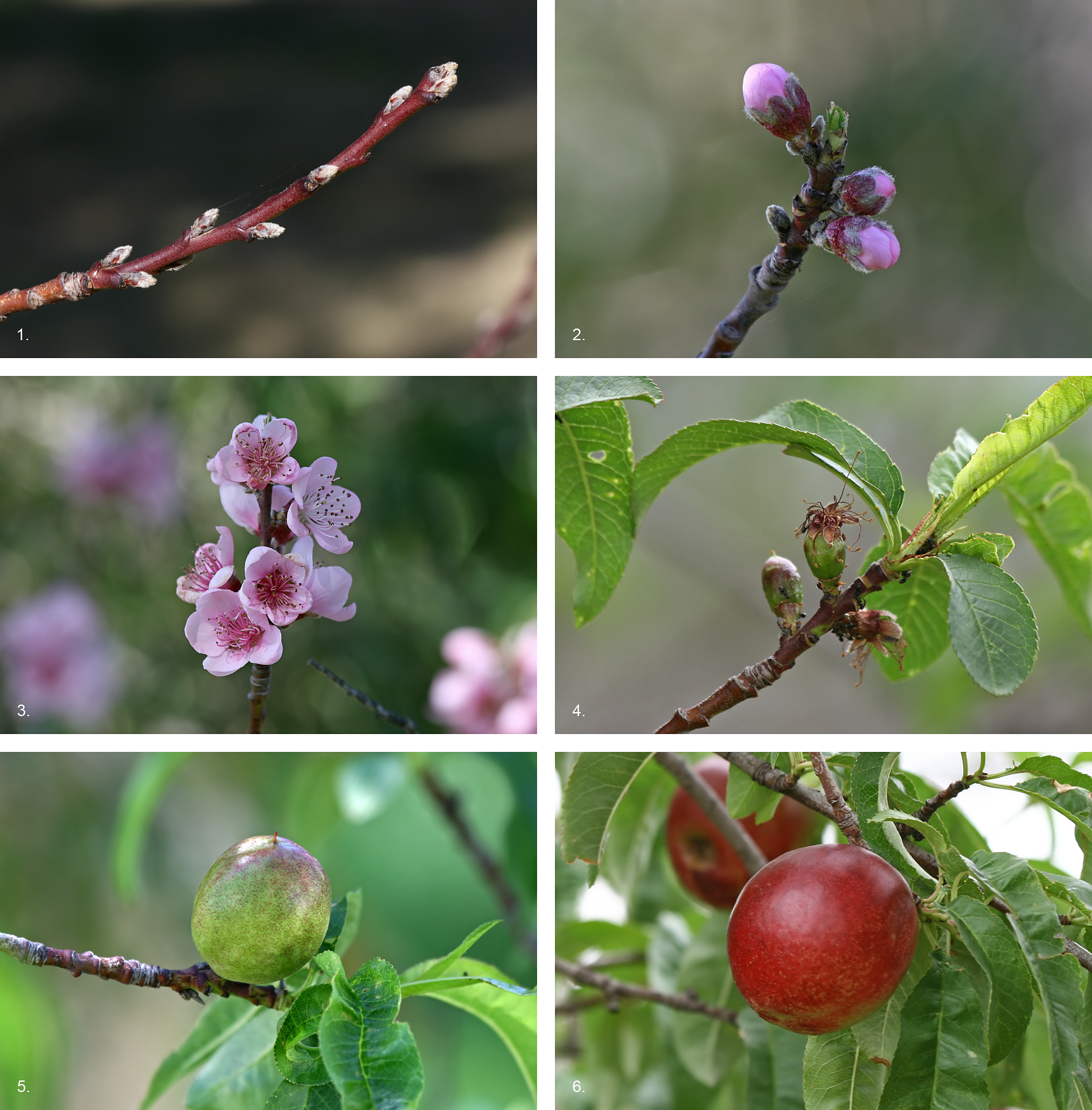
The development sequence of a nectarine (P. persica) over a 7.5-month period, from bud formation in early winter to fruit ripening in midsummer

The genus Prunus includes the almond, the nectarine and peach, several species of apricots, cherries, and plums, all of which have cultivars developed for commercial fruit and nut production. The almond is not a true nut; the edible part is the seed. Other species are occasionally cultivated or used for their seed and fruit.

A number of species, hybrids, and cultivars are grown as ornamental plants, usually for their profusion of flowers, sometimes for ornamental foliage and shape, and occasionally for their bark.

Because of their considerable value as both food and ornamental plants, many Prunus species have been introduced to parts of the world to which they are not native, some becoming naturalised.

The Tree of 40 Fruit has 40 varieties grafted on to one rootstock.

Species such as blackthorn (P. spinosa) are grown for hedging, game cover, and other utilitarian purposes.

The wood of some species (notably black cherry) is prized as a furniture and cabinetry timber, especially in North America.

Many species produce an aromatic gum from wounds in the trunk; this is sometimes used medicinally. Other minor uses include dye production.

Pygeum, a herbal remedy containing extracts from the bark of P. africana, is used as to alleviate some of the discomfort caused by inflammation in patients with benign prostatic hyperplasia.

Prunus species are included in the Tasmanian Fire Service's list of low flammability plants, indicating that it is suitable for growing within a building protection zone.

=== Ornamental Prunus ===
Ornamentals include the group that may be collectively called "flowering cherries" (including sakura, the Japanese flowering cherries).

== Toxicity ==
Many species are cyanogenic; that is, they contain compounds called cyanogenic glucosides, notably amygdalin, which, on hydrolysis, yield hydrogen cyanide. Although the fruits of some may be edible by humans and livestock (in addition to the ubiquitous fructivory of birds), seeds, leaves and other parts may be toxic, some highly so. The plants contain no more than trace amounts of hydrogen cyanide, but on decomposition after crushing and exposure to air or on digestion, poisonous amounts may be generated. The trace amounts may give a characteristic taste ("bitter almond") with increasing bitterness in larger quantities, less tolerable to people than to birds, which habitually feed on specific fruits.

== Uses ==
The fleshy mesocarp surrounding the endocarp is edible while the endocarp itself forms a hard shell called the pyrena ("stone" or "pit"). This encloses the seed (or "kernel"), which is edible in some species (such as almonds) but poisonous in many others (such as apricot kernels). Besides being eaten fresh, most Prunus fruit are also commonly used to make processed foods and beverages such as canned and dried fruit, fruit juices (e.g. cherry and prune juice), jam, gelatine desserts, and roasted seeds.
