= Dwarf cherry =

Dwarf cherry as a name has been used for different species of small cherry trees:

- Dwarf cultivars of Prunus cerasus, e.g.:
  - North Star cherry
- Prunus fruticosa
- Prunus × eminens
- Prunus pumila
- Species of Prunus sect. Microcerarus

An unrelated Australian tree with cherry-like fruit:

- Exocarpus strictus
