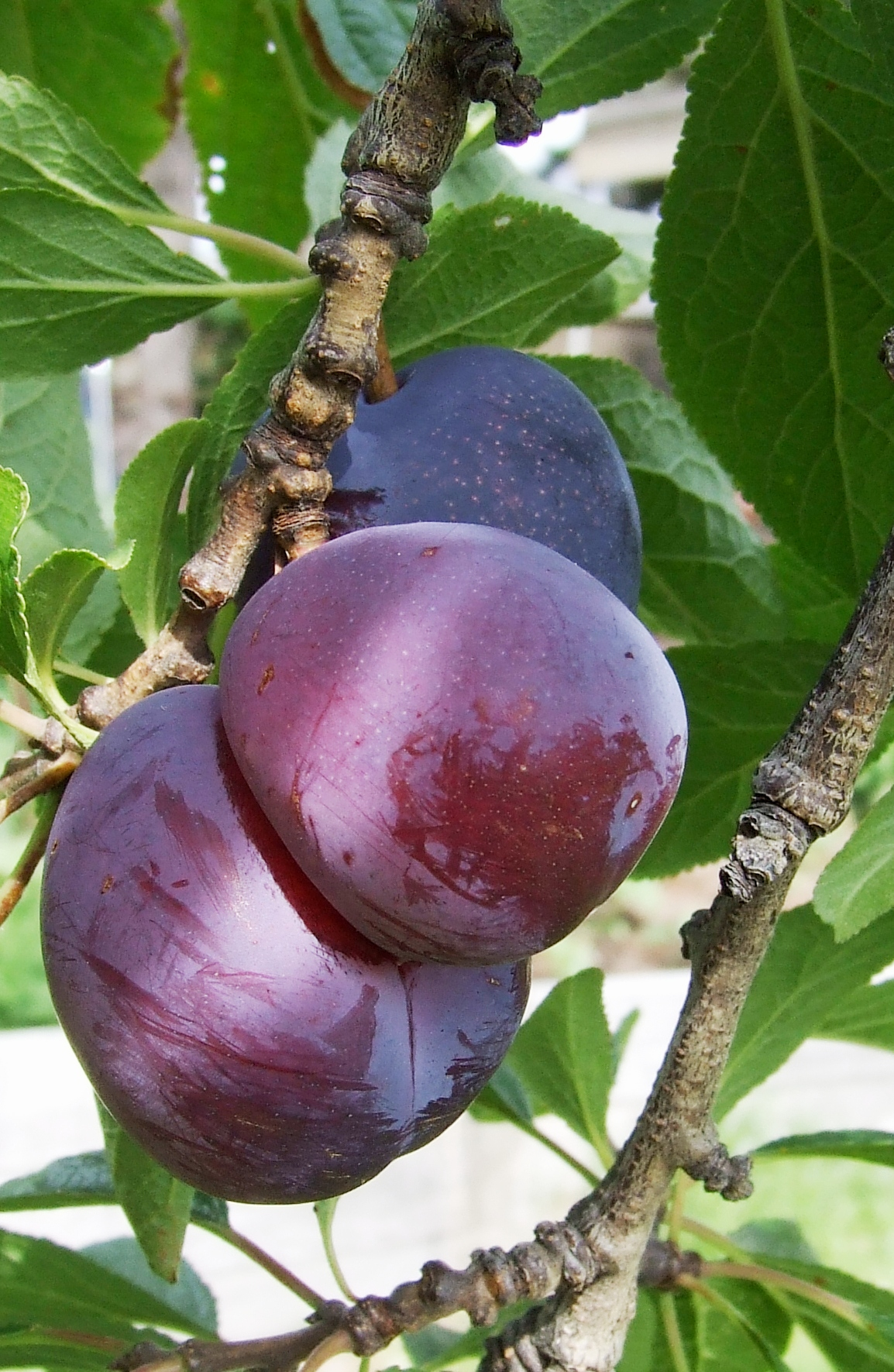
- Prunus salicina

Scientific classification
- Kingdom: Plantae
- Clade: Tracheophytes
- Clade: Angiosperms
- Clade: Eudicots
- Clade: Rosids
- Order: Rosales
- Family: Rosaceae
- Genus: Prunus
- Subgenus: Prunus subg. Prunus
- Section: Prunus sect. Prunus

Type species
- Prunus domestica L.

Species
- See text.

= Prunus sect. Prunus =

Section of plants

Prunus sect. Prunus is a section of Prunus subg. Prunus. It contains species of Eurasian plum.

== Species ==
Species in this section includes:

- Prunus bokhariensis
- Prunus cerasifera – cherry plum
- Prunus cocomilia – Italian plum, cuckoo's apple
- Prunus consociiflora – Hubei plum
- Prunus darvasica – Darwaz plum
- Prunus divaricata – wild cherry plum
- Prunus domestica – European plum
- Prunus ramburii – sloe of Sierra Nevada (Spanish: endrino de Sierra Nevada)
- Prunus salicina – Chinese plum, Japanese plum
- Prunus simonii – apricot plum
- Prunus sogdiana – Sogdian plum
- Prunus spinosa – sloe
- Prunus tadzhikistanica – Tajik plum
- Prunus ursina – bear's plum
- Prunus ussuriensis – Manchurian plum
- Prunus vachuschtii – alucha

Hybrid species (some of them are hybrids with species of other sections):

- Prunus × blireiana – double-flowering plum (P. cerasifera × P. mume)
- Prunus × cistena – purple-leaf sand cherry (P. cerasifera × P. pumila）
- Prunus × ferganica – Fergana plum (P. divaricata × P. ulmifolia)
- Prunus × foveata – pitted-stone plum
- Prunus × fruticans (P. spinosa × P. insititia)
- Prunus × macedonica – Macedonian plum (P. cerasifera × P. cocomilia)
- Prunus × rossica – Russian plum (P. cerasifera × P. salicina)
- Prunus × simmleri (P. cerasifera × P. spinosa)

The taxonomic position of P. brigantina is disputed. It is grouped with species of Prunus sect. Prunus according to chloroplast DNA sequences, but more closely related to species of Prunus sect. Armeniaca according to nuclear DNA sequences.
