= Ectoedemia mahalebella =

Scientific classification
- Kingdom: Animalia
- Phylum: Arthropoda
- Clade: Pancrustacea
- Class: Insecta
- Order: Lepidoptera
- Family: Nepticulidae
- Genus: Ectoedemia
- Species: E. mahalebella

Binomial name
- Ectoedemia mahalebella (Klimesch, 1936)

Synonyms
- Nepticula mahalebella Klimesch, 1936

Species of moth

Ectoedemia mahalebella is a moth of the family Nepticulidae. It is found from the Czech Republic and Slovakia to the Pyrenees, Italy and Greece.

The wingspan is 4.3–5.3 mm. Adults are on wing from May to June. There is one generation per year.

The larvae feed on Prunus avium, Prunus cerasifera, Prunus cerasus, Prunus cocomilia, Prunus domestica, Prunus fruticosa, Prunus mahaleb, Prunus spinosa and Prunus tenella. They mine the leaves of their host plant.
