= Bush cherry =

Bush cherries may refer to:

- Species of Prunus sect. Microcerasus
- Dwarf cultivars of Prunus cerasus, e.g.:
  - North Star cherry
- Dwarf cultivars of Prunus × eminens
