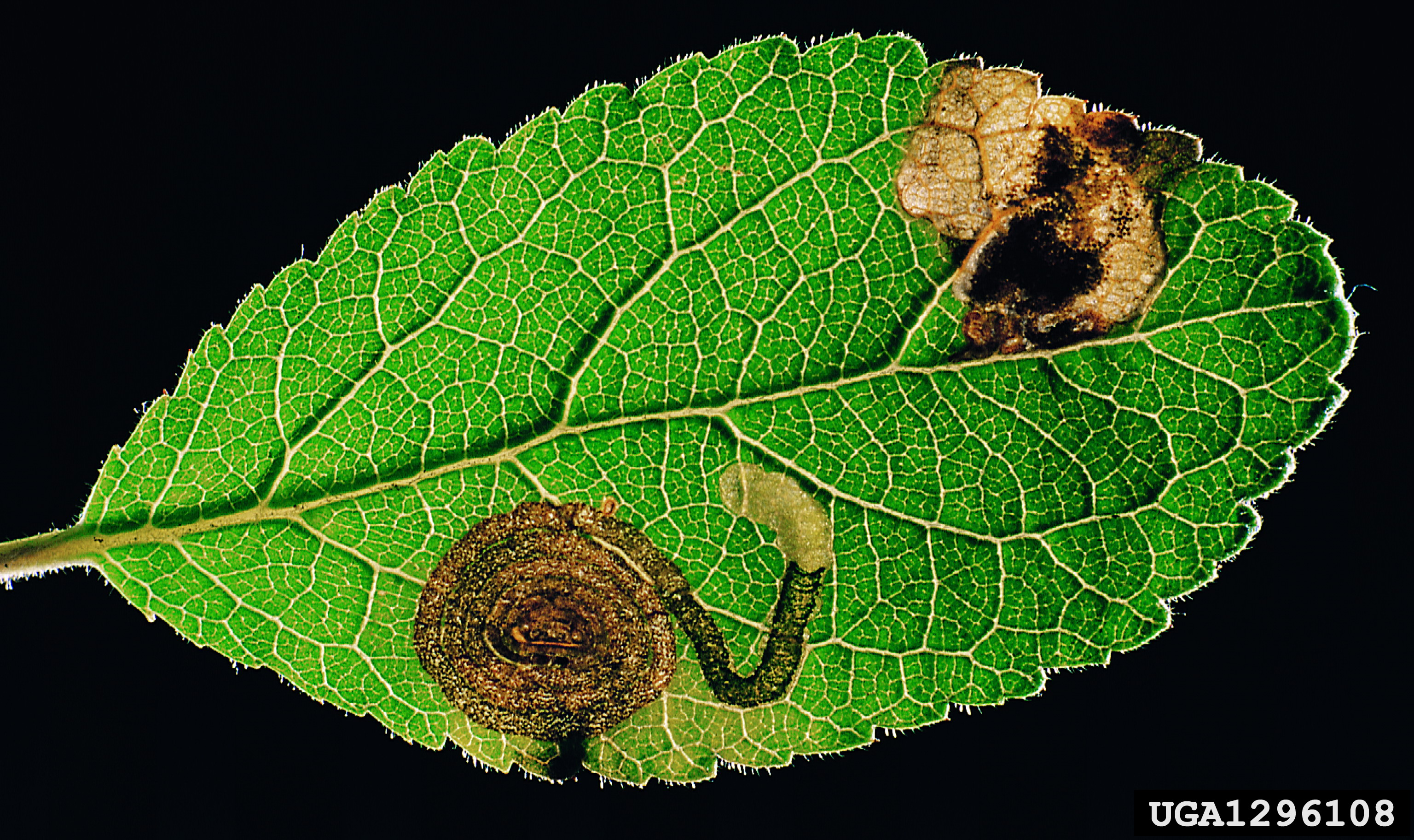

Scientific classification
- Kingdom: Animalia
- Phylum: Arthropoda
- Clade: Pancrustacea
- Class: Insecta
- Order: Lepidoptera
- Family: Nepticulidae
- Genus: Stigmella
- Species: S. prunetorum

Binomial name
- Stigmella prunetorum (Stainton, 1855)

Synonyms
- Nepticula prunetorum Stainton, 1855; Nepticula dimidiatella Herrich-Schaffer, 1855; Nepticula ligustrella Rossler, 1866; Nepticula perpusillella Herrich-Schaffer, 1855; Nepticula prunetella Doubleday, 1859 (unjustified emendation)

= Stigmella prunetorum =

Species of moth

Stigmella prunetorum is a moth of the family Nepticulidae. It is found in all of Europe (except Ireland, the Iberian Peninsula and the Mediterranean islands).

The wingspan is 4.3-4.7 mm. Adults are on wing in May.

The larvae feed on Prunus armeniaca, Prunus avium, Prunus brigantina, Prunus cerasifera, Prunus cerasus, Prunus cocomilia, Prunus domestica, Prunus insititia, Prunus spinosa and Prunus triloba. They mine the leaves of their host plant.
