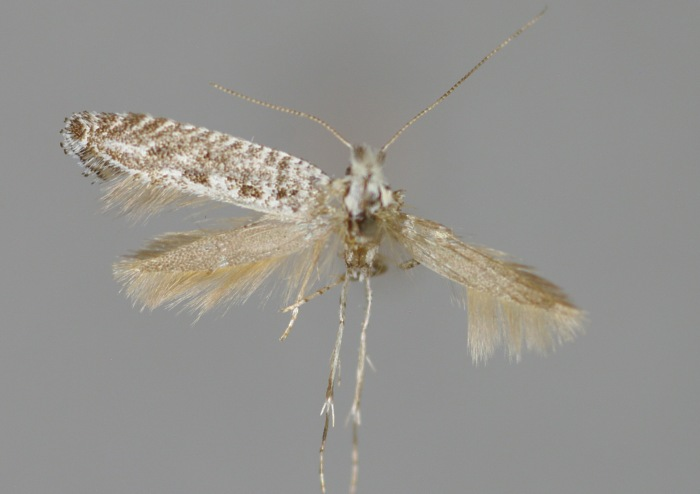

Scientific classification
- Kingdom: Animalia
- Phylum: Arthropoda
- Clade: Pancrustacea
- Class: Insecta
- Order: Lepidoptera
- Family: Gracillariidae
- Genus: Parornix
- Species: P. anguliferella

Binomial name
- Parornix anguliferella (Zeller, 1847)

Synonyms
- Ornix anguliferella Zeller, 1847

= Parornix anguliferella =

Species of moth

Parornix anguliferella is a moth of the family Gracillariidae. It is found from Germany to Sardinia, Sicily and Greece and from the Netherlands to southern Russia.

The larvae feed on Amelanchier ovalis, Cydonia oblonga, Prunus avium, Prunus glandulosa, Prunus mahaleb, Prunus persica, Prunus spinosa, Pyrus amygdaliformis, Pyrus communis and Sorbus species. They mine the leaves of their host plant.
