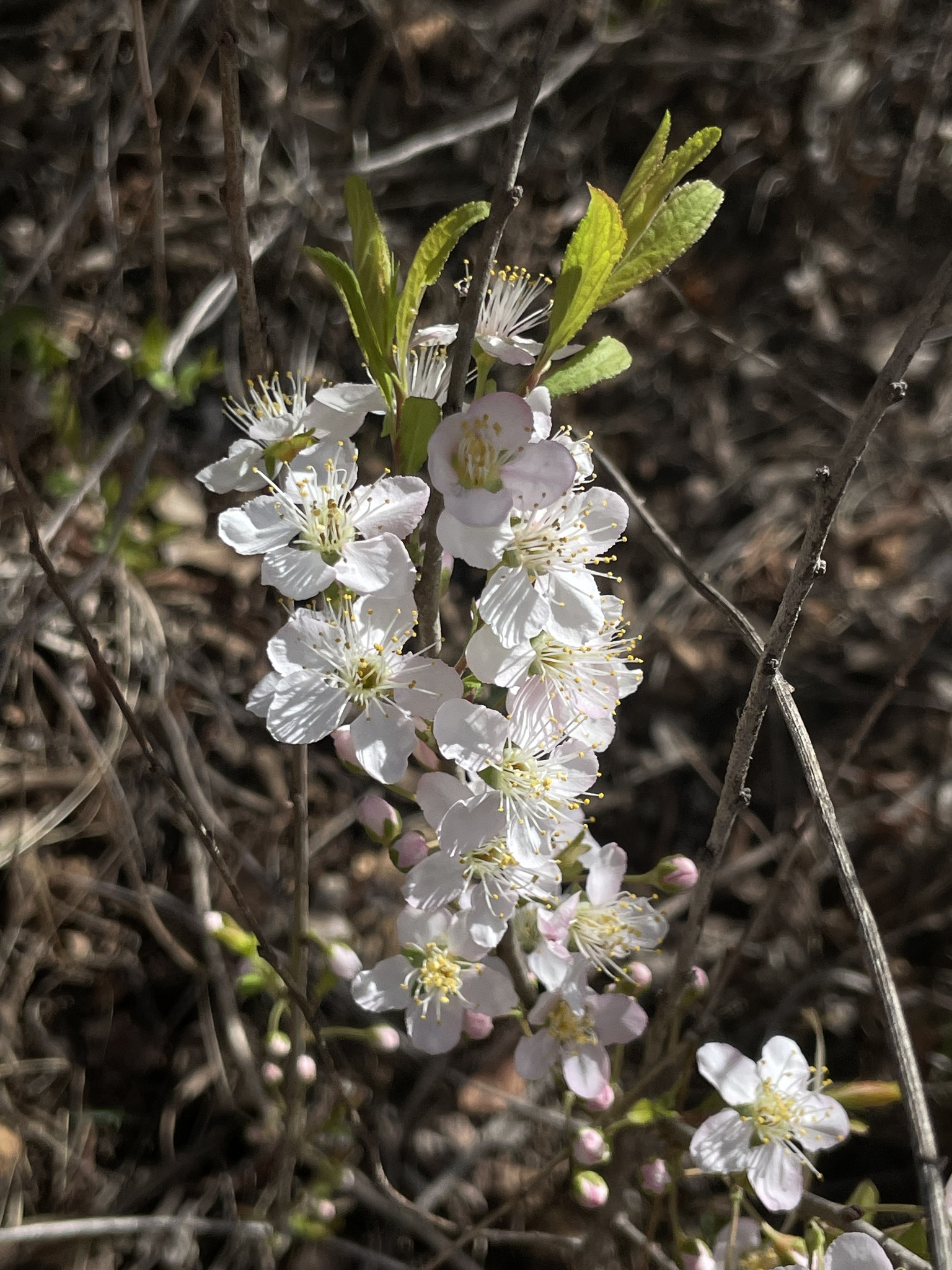

Scientific classification
- Kingdom: Plantae
- Clade: Tracheophytes
- Clade: Angiosperms
- Clade: Eudicots
- Clade: Rosids
- Order: Rosales
- Family: Rosaceae
- Genus: Prunus
- Subgenus: Prunus subg. Prunus
- Section: Prunus sect. Microcerasus
- Species: P. humilis

Binomial name
- Prunus humilis Bunge

Synonyms
- List: Cerasus bungei (Walp.) Walp.; Cerasus humilis (Bunge) S.Ya.Sokolov; Cerasus humilis (Bunge) A.I.Baranov & Liou; Microcerasus glandulosa var. humilis (Bunge) Eremin & Yushev; Prunus bungei Walp.; Prunus glandulosa var. salicifolia (Kom.) Koehne; Prunus japonica var. salicifolia Kom.

= Prunus humilis =

Species of plant

Prunus humilis (Chinese: 欧李) is a species of bush cherry native to northern China. It is cultivated for its edible fruit. Chloroplast DNA sequencing has shown that its closest relative is Prunus dictyoneura, at least as far as chloroplasts are concerned.
