= Prunus darvasica =

Scientific classification
- Kingdom: Plantae
- Clade: Tracheophytes
- Clade: Angiosperms
- Clade: Eudicots
- Clade: Rosids
- Order: Rosales
- Family: Rosaceae
- Genus: Prunus
- Subgenus: Prunus subg. Prunus
- Section: Prunus sect. Prunus
- Species: P. darvasica

Binomial name
- Prunus darvasica Temb.

Species of tree

Prunus darvasica, the Darvaz plum, is rare plant endemic to Tajikistan. It is found in the Tajik portion of the Pamir Mountains, the Darvoz Range. There, the plants grow as shrubs 1.5-2.5 m tall. The fruit are small (2 cm) but otherwise typical plums, nearly black, with a blue waxy coat. The pit is brown. The fruit is edible and can be made into jam or compote.

It is suspected that P. darvasica is of hybrid origin, as it is a tetraploid with 48 (or 32, depending on the source) chromosomes, possibly the result of P. domestica × (P. prostrata × P. cerasifera).
