= Prunus griffithii =

Scientific classification
- Kingdom: Plantae
- Clade: Tracheophytes
- Clade: Angiosperms
- Clade: Eudicots
- Clade: Rosids
- Order: Rosales
- Family: Rosaceae
- Genus: Prunus
- Subgenus: Prunus subg. Prunus
- Section: Prunus sect. Microcerasus
- Species: P. griffithii

Binomial name
- Prunus griffithii (Boiss.) C.K.Schneid.

Synonyms
- Cerasus griffithii Boiss.; Microcerasus prostrata f. griffithii (Boiss. & Hausskn.) Eremin & Yushev

Species of tree

Prunus griffithii is a species of bush cherry native to Afghanistan and northern Pakistan.
