= Prunus brachypetala =

Scientific classification
- Kingdom: Plantae
- Clade: Tracheophytes
- Clade: Angiosperms
- Clade: Eudicots
- Clade: Rosids
- Order: Rosales
- Family: Rosaceae
- Genus: Prunus
- Subgenus: Prunus subg. Prunus
- Section: Prunus sect. Microcerasus
- Species: P. brachypetala

Binomial name
- Prunus brachypetala (Boiss.) Walp.

Synonyms
- Cerasus brachypetala Boiss.; Cerasus boissieri Pojark.; Cerasus bornmuelleri (C.K.Schneider) Woron.; Cerasus brachypetala var. bornmuelleri (C.K.Schneider) Browicz; Cerasus incisa Boiss.; Microcerasus prostrata f. brachypetala (Boiss.) G.V.Eremin & A.A.Yushev; Prunus bornmuelleri (C.K.Schneid.) Hand.-Mazz.; Prunus brachypetala var. bornmuelleri C.K.Schneider

Species of plant in the rose family

Prunus brachypetala is a species of bush cherry native to Turkey, Iraq and Iran. (Note: The clade to which P. brachypetala belongs according to the two studies is now a section of Prunus subg. Prunus.) Its fruit are edible and consumed locally.
