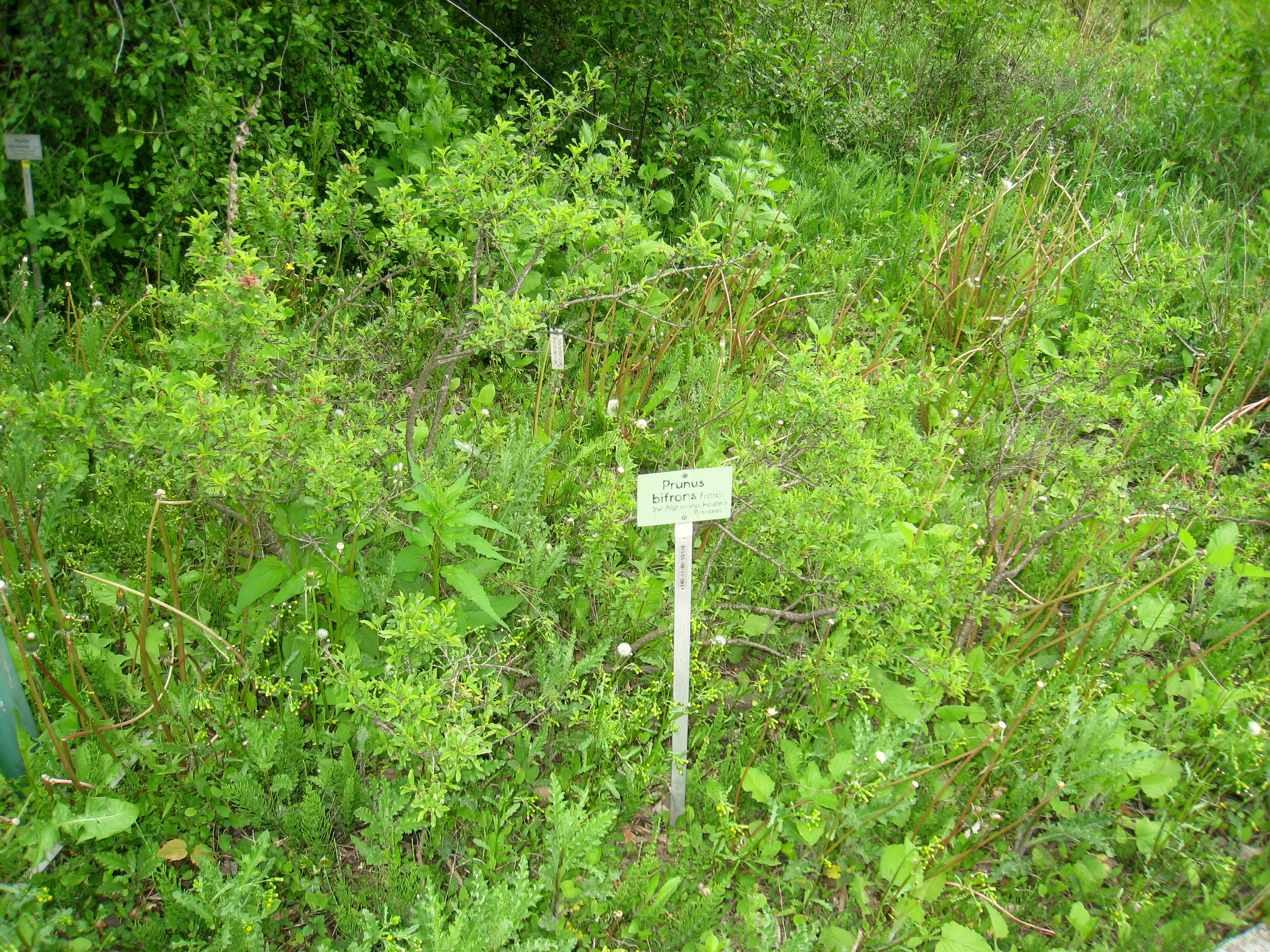

Scientific classification
- Kingdom: Plantae
- Clade: Tracheophytes
- Clade: Angiosperms
- Clade: Eudicots
- Clade: Rosids
- Order: Rosales
- Family: Rosaceae
- Genus: Prunus
- Subgenus: Prunus subg. Prunus
- Section: Prunus sect. Microcerasus
- Species: P. bifrons

Binomial name
- Prunus bifrons Fritsch

Synonyms
- Cerasus erythrocarpa Nevski; Prunus erythrocarpa (Nevski) Gilli; Prunus afghana Cardot

= Prunus bifrons =

Species of tree

Prunus bifrons is a species of Prunus native to temperate and tropical Asia.

== References and external links ==
- GBIF entry
- Sitzungsber. Kaiserl. Akad. Wiss., Wien, Math.-Naturwiss. Cl., Abt. 1, 101:637. 1892
- Rehder, A. 1949. Bibliography of cultivated trees and shrubs.
- "Prunus bifrons". Plants for a Future.
