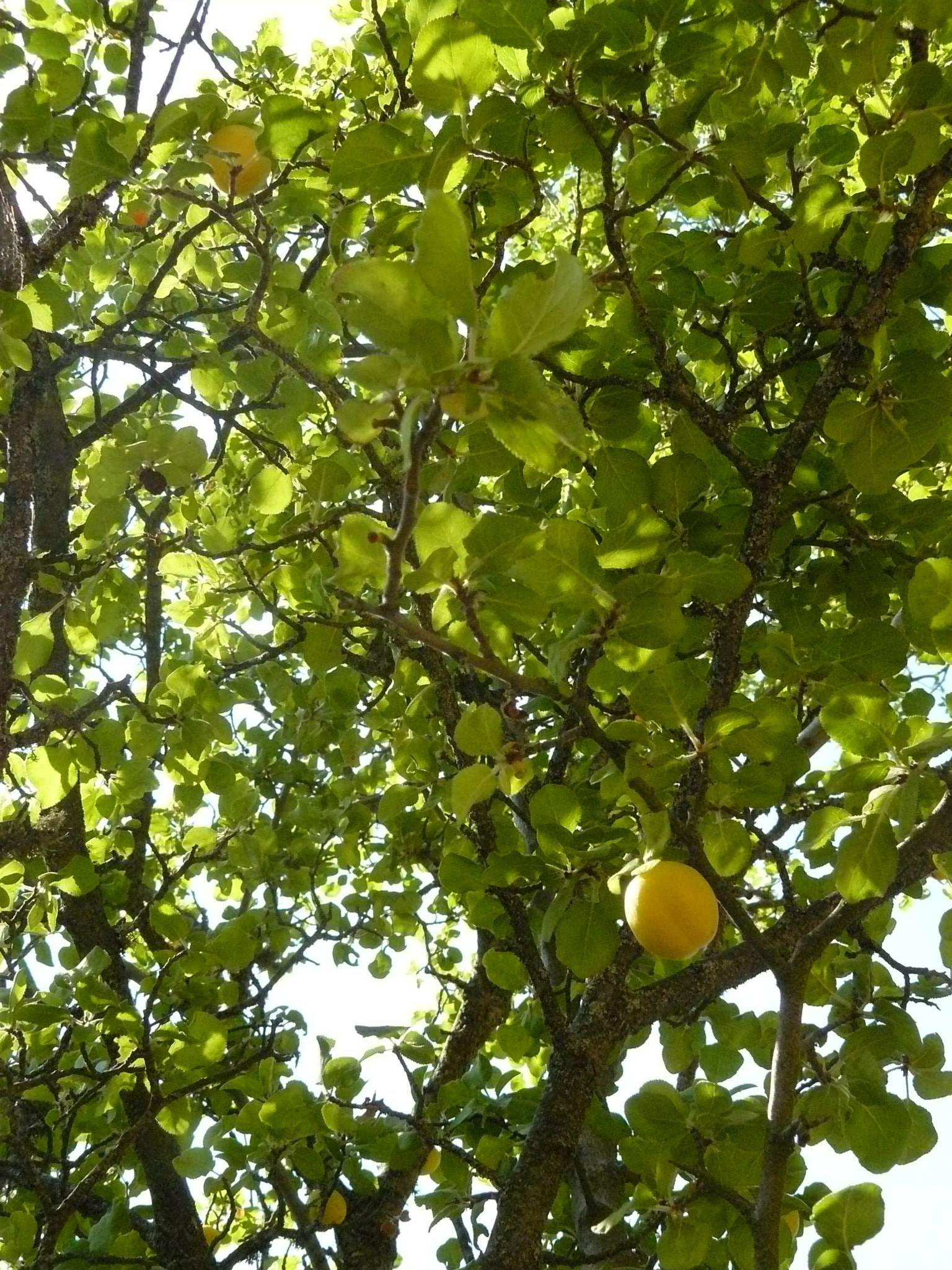
- Prunus ursina in Horsh Ehden reserve, Lebanon

Scientific classification
- Kingdom: Plantae
- Clade: Tracheophytes
- Clade: Angiosperms
- Clade: Eudicots
- Clade: Rosids
- Order: Rosales
- Family: Rosaceae
- Genus: Prunus
- Species: P. ursina

Binomial name
- Prunus ursina Kotschy

Synonyms
- Prunus divaricata subsp. ursina; Prunus cocomilia Ten.

= Prunus ursina =

Bear's plum

Species of plant

Prunus ursina (bear's plum, Arabic: خوخ الدب ) is a species of prunus native to the woods of Western Asia from Turkey to Syria, Israel and Lebanon. Some sources include this species in Prunus cocomilia.

== Description ==
Prunus ursina is a deciduous shrub to a small tree, reaching 4 to 8 metres (13 to 26 ft) in height. It is highly branched and the branches sometimes bear spines. The twigs are velvety and the leaves are ovate to oblong.

Prunus ursina produces white hermaphrodite flowers in pairs during the spring. Its 2-to-3 cm unpalatable fruit is globose and turns yellow to dark orange when ripe.

== Etymology ==
Prunus, from the Latin "prūnus" which is a loan from Greek (προῦνον, prounon) means plum tree. Ursina derives from "ursus", a bear, referring to one of a bear's favorite foods.

== Cultivation ==
Prunus ursina fruits better in full sun but is still successful in partial shade. The tree will form suckers if its shallow roots are damaged. Among the pests that affect the genus Prunus is honey fungus. The seed requires two–three (2–3) months cold stratification in order to germinate.

== Toxicity ==
The fruit may be toxic if consumed excessively. Prunus plants contain amygdalin and prunasin, which break down in water to produce hydrogen cyanide. This is a colorless, extremely poisonous chemical that gives almonds their characteristic flavour. These substances are found mainly in the leaves and seed and can be detected by the bitter taste. It is usually present in too small a quantity to do any harm, but any very bitter seed or fruit should not be eaten.

== Uses ==
The fruit can be used to obtain a dark grey to green dye and a green dye can be obtained from the leaves.

Consumption of small quantities of hydrogen cyanide stimulates respiration and improves digestion. Excessive consumption of the toxin can cause respiratory failure and death.
