= Prunus dictyoneura =

Scientific classification
- Kingdom: Plantae
- Clade: Tracheophytes
- Clade: Angiosperms
- Clade: Eudicots
- Clade: Rosids
- Order: Rosales
- Family: Rosaceae
- Genus: Prunus
- Subgenus: Prunus subg. Prunus
- Section: Prunus sect. Microcerasus
- Species: P. dictyoneura

Binomial name
- Prunus dictyoneura Diels

Synonyms
- Cerasus dictyoneura (Diels) Holub; Cerasus dictyoneura (Diels) T.T.Yu; Microcerasus glandulosa f. dictyoneura (Diels) G.V.Eremin & A.A.Yushev; Prunus humilis var. villosula Bunge

Species of tree

Prunus dictyoneura (Chinese: 毛叶欧李) is a species of bush cherry found in Gansu, Hebei, Henan, Jiangsu, Ningxia, Shaanxi and Shanxi provinces of China. A shrub 0.3 to 1.0 (occasionally 2.0) m tall, it prefers to grow in thickets in grasslands on hillsides from 400 to 1600 (occasionally 2,300) m above sea level. Chloroplast DNA sequencing has shown that its closest relative is Prunus humilis, at least as far as chloroplasts are concerned.

== Description ==
Prunus dictyoneura are shrubs at most 2 m tall. The bark of branchlets is brownish gray, and young branchlets are pubescent. Winter buds are ovoid and densely downy. The stipules are linear, 3 to 4 mm long, with margins gland-tipped and serrate. Petioles are 2 to 3 mm long and densely pubescent. P. dictyoneura leaf blades are obovate-elliptic, and 1.0 to 2.5 cm wide by 2 to 4 cm long. They have cuneate bases, serrate or biserrate margins, and rounded to acute apices, with 5 to 8 secondary veins on either side of the midvein, with conspicuous reticulate veins. The abaxial surface of the leaves are pale green and densely brown hirsute, and the adaxial surface of the leaves is dark green and glabrous or pubescent, and usually crisp.

Inflorescences are one-flowered to three-flowered, and held in a fascicle. Pedicels are 4 to 8 cm and densely pubescent. The hypanthia are campanulate, 3 by 3 mm and externally pubescent. The sepals are ovate, 3 mm long, with acute apices. Petals are white to pink, and obovate. There are 30 to 35 stamens per flower. The styles are almost as long as the stamens. The fruit, a drupe, is red when ripe, and globose. Flowers open before the leaves, in April through May, and fruits set in July through September, depending on local temperatures.

== Uses ==
It is occasionally cultivated for medicinal purposes.
