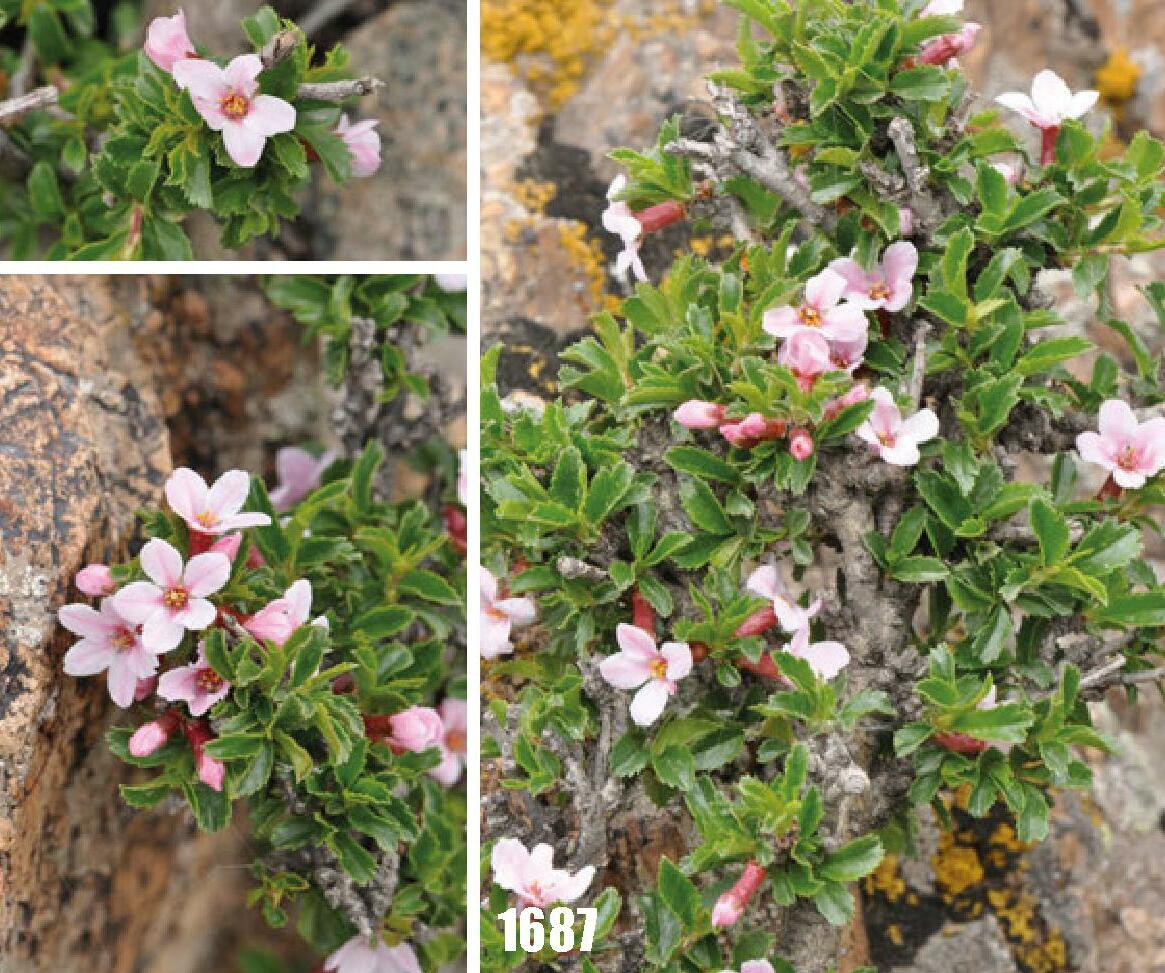

Scientific classification
- Kingdom: Plantae
- Clade: Tracheophytes
- Clade: Angiosperms
- Clade: Eudicots
- Clade: Rosids
- Order: Rosales
- Family: Rosaceae
- Genus: Prunus
- Subgenus: Prunus subg. Prunus
- Section: Prunus sect. Microcerasus
- Species: P. tianshanica

Binomial name
- Prunus tianshanica (Pojark.) S.Shi

Synonyms
- Cerasus tianshanica Pojark.; Microcerasus prostrata var. tianschanica (Pojark.) Eremin & Yushev (Note: Note the misspelling of the specific epithet as tianschanica. This spelling is used in other binomials referring to the Tian-shan range. Another frequently seen misspelling is tienshanica.); Microcerasus prostrata M.Roem. var. tianshanica (Pojark.) Eremin & Yushev; Cerasus prostrata (Labill.) Ser. var. concolor Boiss.; Prunus prostrata Labill. var. concolor (Boiss.) Lipsky

= Prunus tianshanica =

Species of tree

Prunus tianshanica, the Tianshan cherry, is a species of cherry native to the Tianshan Mountains of Central Asia, preferring to grow at 800-1000 m.

== Description ==
Prunus tianshanica is a shrub reaching 1.0–1.6 metres (3–5 ft). The bark is grey, turning browner with age. The flowers are pink, and the dark red fruits, although small, are high in sugar and pleasant to the taste. It hybridizes naturally with Prunus cerasifera, and the offspring produce fruit. A phylogenetic reconstruction using twelve chloroplast loci and three nuclear genes of 84 species of Prunus shows that Cerasus is indisputably a synonym (and subgenus) of Prunus and that Cerasus tianshanica is properly Prunus tianshanica.
