= Prunus alaica =

Scientific classification
- Kingdom: Plantae
- Clade: Tracheophytes
- Clade: Angiosperms
- Clade: Eudicots
- Clade: Rosids
- Order: Rosales
- Family: Rosaceae
- Genus: Prunus
- Subgenus: Prunus subg. Prunus
- Section: Prunus sect. Microcerasus
- Species: P. alaica

Binomial name
- Prunus alaica (Pojark.) Gilli

Synonyms
- Cerasus alaica Pojark.; Microcerasus prostrata f. alaica (Pojark.) Eremin & Yushev

Species of tree

Prunus alaica is a species of bush cherry native to Central Asia.
