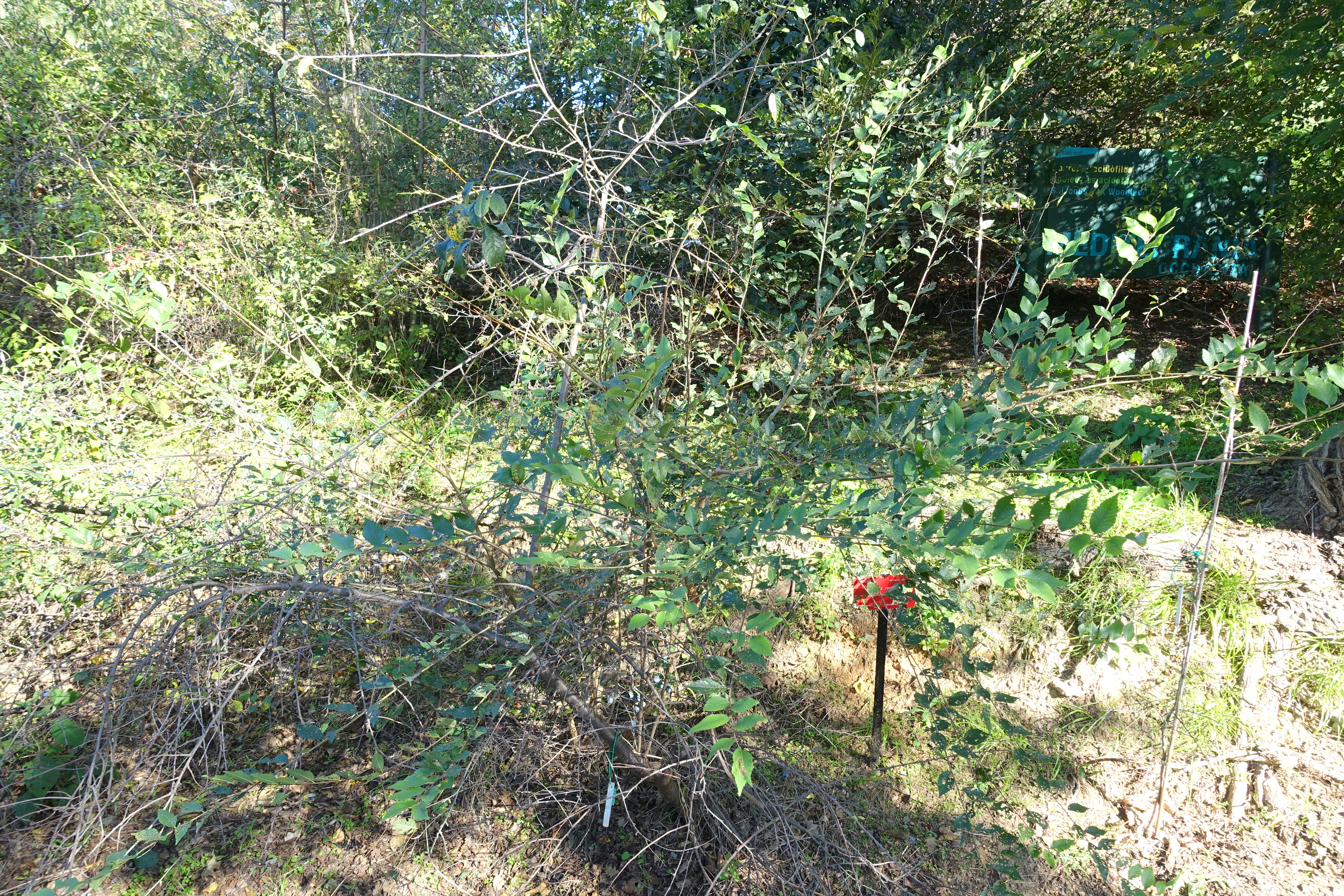

Conservation status
- Vulnerable (IUCN 3.1)

Scientific classification
- Kingdom: Plantae
- Clade: Tracheophytes
- Clade: Angiosperms
- Clade: Eudicots
- Clade: Rosids
- Order: Rosales
- Family: Rosaceae
- Genus: Prunus
- Subgenus: Prunus subg. Prunus
- Section: Prunus sect. Prunus
- Species: P. ramburii

Binomial name
- Prunus ramburii Boiss.

Synonyms
- Prunus amygdalina Webb

= Prunus ramburii =

Species of plant in the rose family

Prunus ramburii (Spanish: endrino de Sierra Nevada, "sloe of Sierra Nevada") is a species of plant in the family Rosaceae. It is endemic to Spain. It is threatened by habitat loss.
