= Prunus pojarkovii =

Scientific classification
- Kingdom: Plantae
- Clade: Tracheophytes
- Clade: Angiosperms
- Clade: Eudicots
- Clade: Rosids
- Order: Rosales
- Family: Rosaceae
- Genus: Prunus
- Subgenus: Prunus subg. Prunus
- Section: Prunus sect. Microcerasus
- Species: P. pojarkovii

Binomial name
- Prunus pojarkovii A.E.Murray

Synonyms
- Cerasus turcomanica Pojark.; Prunus turcomanica (Pojark.) Gilli

Species of tree

Prunus pojarkovii is a species of bush cherry native to southern Turkmenistan and Golestan of Iran.
