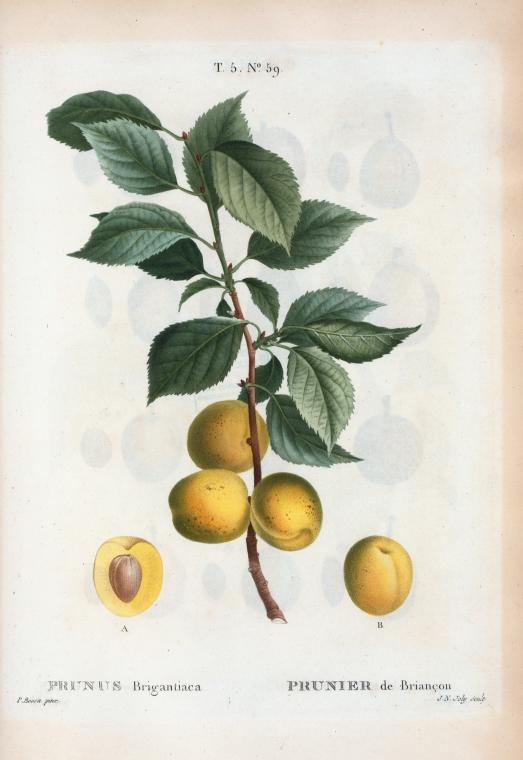

Conservation status
- Data Deficient (IUCN 3.1)

Scientific classification
- Kingdom: Plantae
- Clade: Tracheophytes
- Clade: Angiosperms
- Clade: Eudicots
- Clade: Rosids
- Order: Rosales
- Family: Rosaceae
- Genus: Prunus
- Subgenus: Prunus subg. Prunus
- Species: P. brigantina

Binomial name
- Prunus brigantina Vill.

Synonyms
- Armeniaca brigantiaca (Vill.) Pers.; Prunus brigantiaca Vill.

= Prunus brigantina =

Species of tree

Prunus brigantina, called Briançon apricot (French: Abricotier de Briançon), Briançon plum (French: Prunier de Briançon), marmot plum (French: Marmottier), and Alpine apricot, is a wild tree species native to France and Italy. Its fruit is edible and similar to the commercial apricot P. armeniaca, but it is smooth unlike apricots. An edible oil produced from the seed, 'huile des marmottes', is used in France.

It is disputed whether P. brigantina is an apricot or a plum. It is grouped with plum species according to chloroplast DNA sequences, but more closely related to apricot species according to nuclear DNA sequences.
