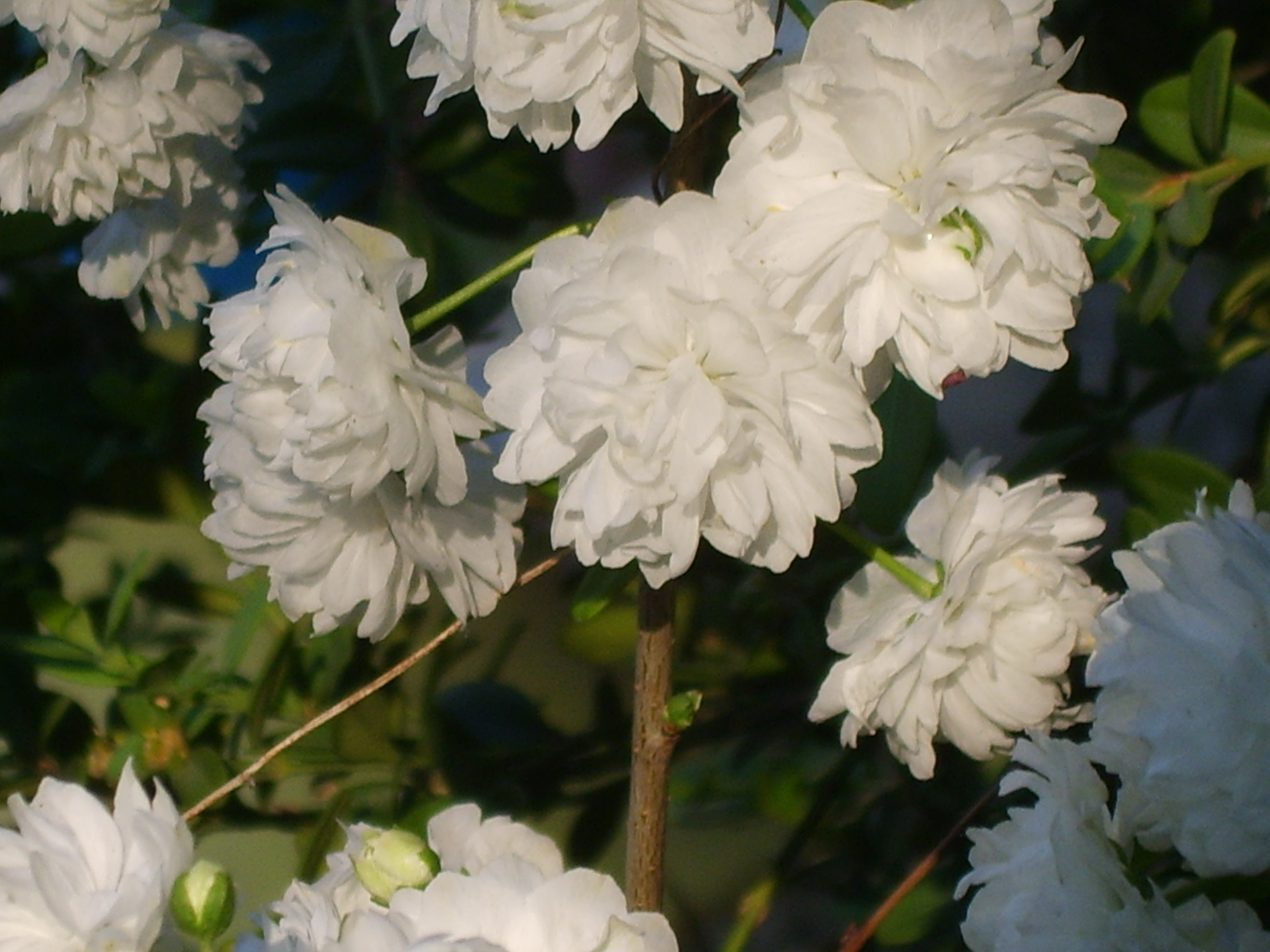
- Prunus glandulosa alboplena

Scientific classification
- Kingdom: Plantae
- Clade: Tracheophytes
- Clade: Angiosperms
- Clade: Eudicots
- Clade: Rosids
- Order: Rosales
- Family: Rosaceae
- Genus: Prunus
- Subgenus: Prunus subg. Prunus
- Section: Prunus sect. Microcerasus
- Species: P. glandulosa

Binomial name
- Prunus glandulosa Thunb.

Synonyms
- Microcerasus glandulosa (Thunb.) M.Roem.; Prunus japonica Bean; Prunus pumilio Batsch; Prunus sinensis Pers.

= Prunus glandulosa =

Species of shrub

Prunus glandulosa, called Chinese bush cherry, Chinese plum, and dwarf flowering almond, is a species of shrub tree native to China and long present in Japan. It is commonly used as an ornamental tree and for cut flowers.

It has white or pink flowers - single or double varies with cultivar - that bloom in Spring. Fruits are dark red. Its height is about 1.5 meters (4.9 ft) and prefers rocky slopes with plenty of sun. Leaves are alternating, pointy, and light green. It is drought tolerant. It is susceptible to mice as well as these diseases: fire blight, leaf spot, die back, leaf curl, powdery mildew, root rot, and honey fungus.

Cultivars include: 'Alba' - (single white flowers), 'Alba Plena' (also 'Alboplena') - (double white flowers), 'Lawrence' - (single white-pink flowers), 'Rosea Plena' (also 'Sinensis') - (double pink flowers).
