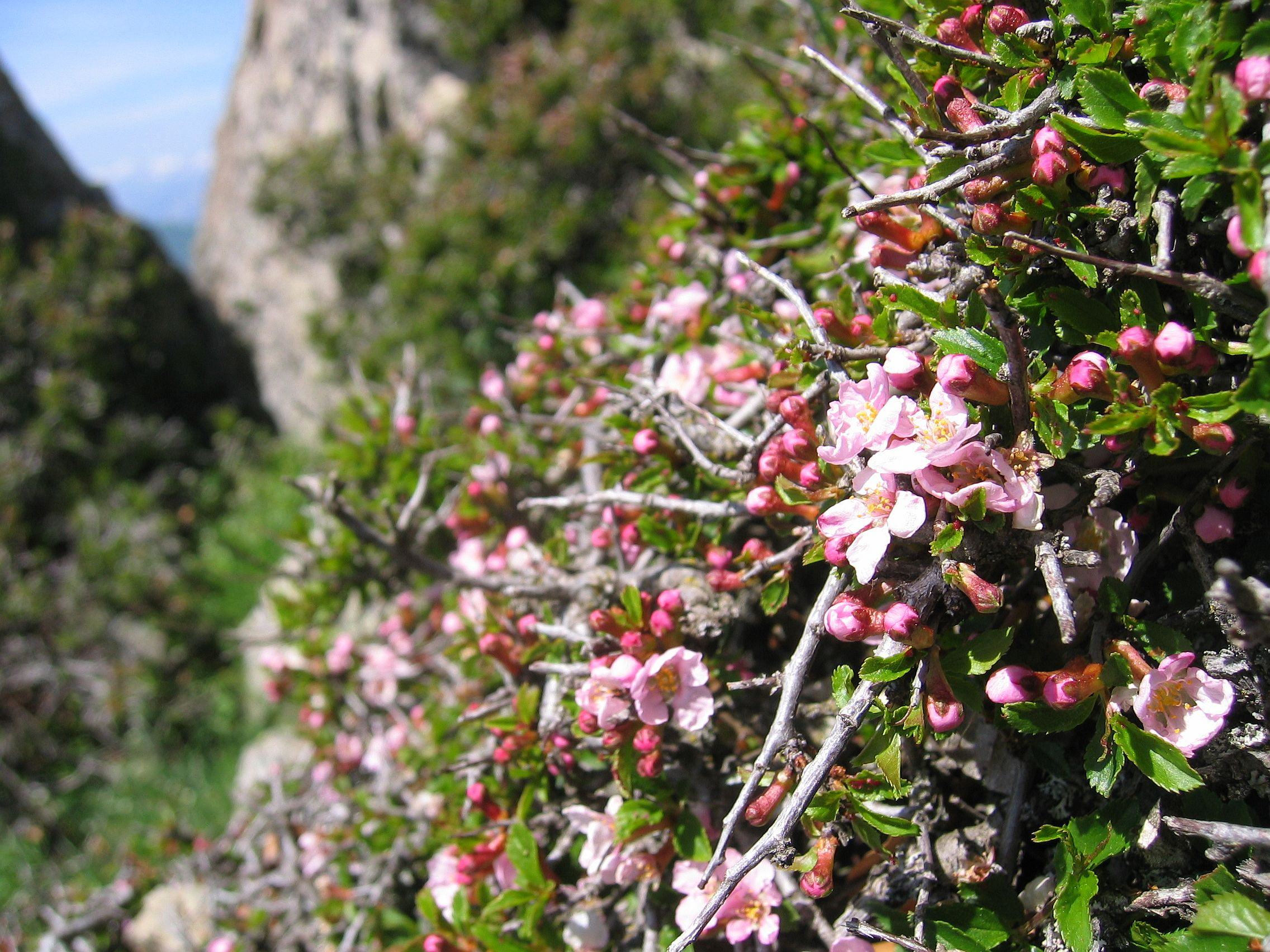
- Prunus prostrata

Scientific classification
- Kingdom: Plantae
- Clade: Tracheophytes
- Clade: Angiosperms
- Clade: Eudicots
- Clade: Rosids
- Order: Rosales
- Family: Rosaceae
- Genus: Prunus
- Subgenus: Prunus subg. Prunus
- Section: Prunus sect. Microcerasus (Webb & Berthel.) C.K.Schneid.

Type species
- Prunus prostrata Labill.

Species
- See text

= Prunus sect. Microcerasus =

Group of trees

Prunus sect. Microcerasus is a section of Prunus. It used to be included in Prunus subg. Cerasus, but phylogenetic research indicates it belongs to Prunus subg. Prunus. It differs from Prunus subg. Cerasus by having three winter buds per axil.

== Species ==
Species in this section are often called bush cherries or dwarf cherries. They include:

- Prunus alaica
- Prunus albicaulis
- Prunus bifrons
- Prunus brachypetala
- Prunus chorossanica
- Prunus dictyoneura
- Prunus erythrocarpa
- Prunus erzincanica
- Prunus glandulosa
- Prunus griffithii
- Prunus hippophaeoides
- Prunus humilis
- Prunus incana
- Prunus jacquemontii
- Prunus japonica
- Prunus microcarpa
- Prunus pogonostyla
- Prunus pojarkovii
- Prunus prostrata
- Prunus pseudoprostrata
- Prunus pumila
  - Prunus pumila var. besseyi
  - Prunus pumila var. depressa
- Prunus susquehanae
- Prunus tianshanica
- Prunus tomentosa
- Prunus verrucosa
- Prunus yazdiana

Hybrids:

- Prunus × cistena
