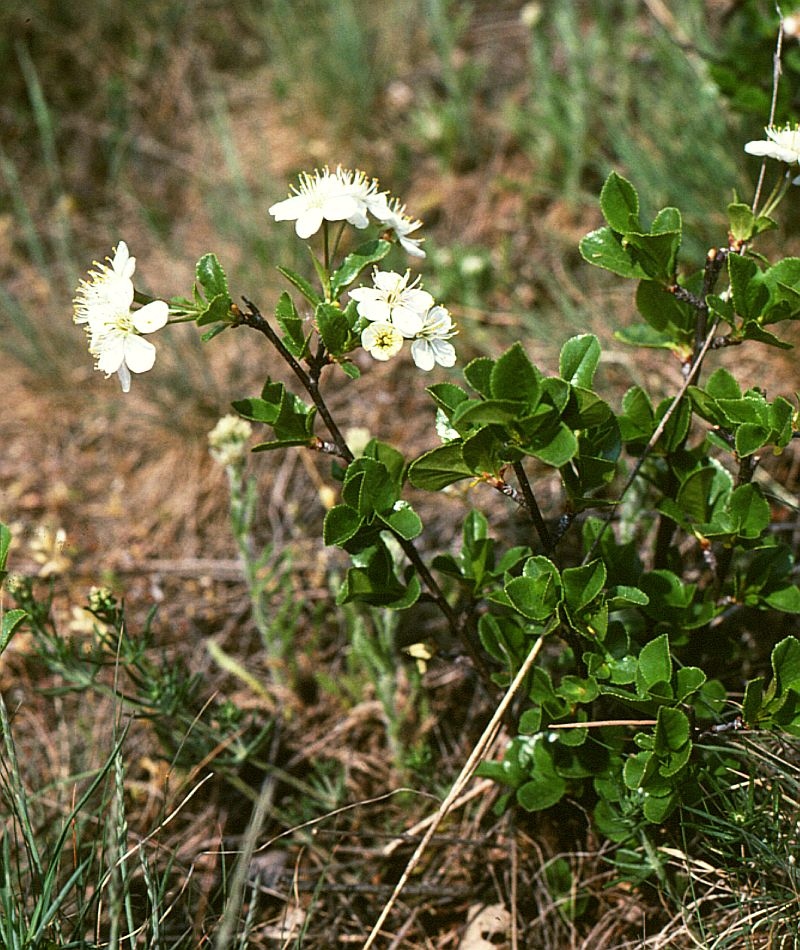
- Flowers

Conservation status
- Least Concern (IUCN 3.1)

Scientific classification
- Kingdom: Plantae
- Clade: Tracheophytes
- Clade: Angiosperms
- Clade: Eudicots
- Clade: Rosids
- Order: Rosales
- Family: Rosaceae
- Genus: Prunus
- Subgenus: Prunus subg. Cerasus
- Species: P. fruticosa

Binomial name
- Prunus fruticosa Pall.

Synonyms
- Cerasus fruticosa (Pall.) Woronow; Prunus intermedia Poiret

= Prunus fruticosa =

Species of plant

Prunus fruticosa, the European dwarf cherry, dwarf cherry, Mongolian cherry or steppe cherry is a deciduous, xerophytic, winter-hardy, cherry-bearing shrub. It is also called ground cherry and European ground cherry, but is not to be confused with plants in the distinct "Groundcherry" genus of Physalis.

Prunus fruticosa is native to central and southeastern Europe, Ukraine, European Russia, the northern Caucasus, Kazakhstan, and the Altai.

== Description ==
As a shrub Prunus fruticosa grows 1–2 metres (3–7 ft) high and as wide, in almost any soil, but best in loamy soil, spreading via suckers. Roots are abundant. The plant requires full sun, it is a steppe rather than a forest plant, although it does form thickets at the edges of open forest.

The bark is dark brown with yellow lenticels. The leaves are oblanceolate to obovate, about 12 mm by 6 mm, with acuminate apex, glabrous above, thick, serrated with crenate margin, dark green, yellow in autumn, with a short petiole.

The flowers are white hermaphroditic blossoms in leafy bracts located 2-4 each on short peduncles in sessile umbels. They are pollinated by bees. In the Northern Hemisphere, the plant flowers in May. The fruit is light to dark red, globose to pyriform, about 8–25 mm in diameter, ripening in August. The taste is sour-sweet, or tart.

== Uses ==
As a sour tasting cherry, the fruit is used in cooking, and for jams and jellies. It has medicinal uses as an astringent. The flowers are its basis of bee-keeping honey plant.

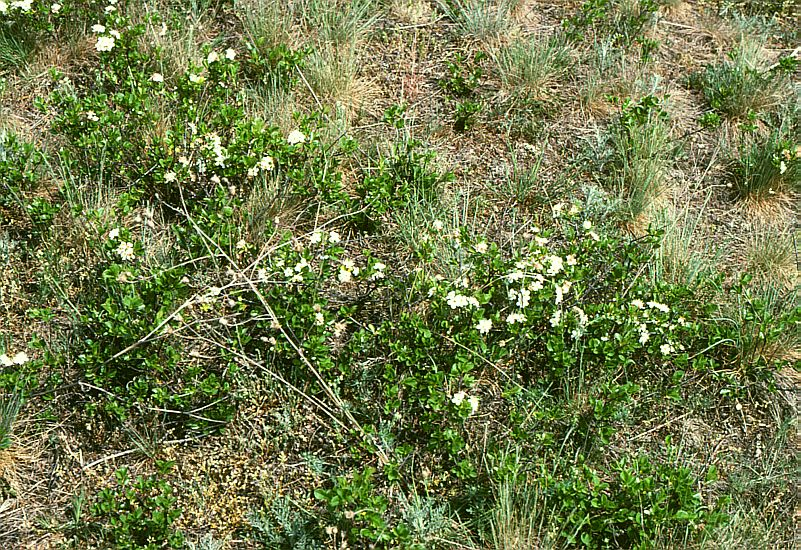
Prunus fruticosa planted for soil stabilization in an open habitat

=== Cultivation ===
Prunus fruticosa is planted in hedgerows as an ornamental plant privacy screen and windbreak, and as a host plant for bees and other beneficial insects and birds. The shrub's network of penetrating roots are useful for soil stabilization in designed landscapes and habitat restoration projects.

The hardiness of Prunus fruticosa is a desirable quality in grafting and production of horticultural cultivars. It is grafted to Prunus avium 'tree' rootstock, forming rounded top trees.

== Classification ==
Linnaeus

Linnaeus included this species in his Species Plantarum, referencing the Pinax of Gaspard Bauhin, to whom he gives credit as "Bauh. pin. 450." The name assigned by Linnaeus is Prunus cerasus pumila, where pumila means "dwarf" (a rare word in Latin) and must come from Bauhin. He regards the shub as a variety of Prunus cerasus, the sour cherry.

Pallas

It was first authoritatively defined by Peter Simon Pallas, the German naturalist invited by Catherine the Great to work in St. Petersburg. His unfinished Flora Rossica, a description of all the plants in the Russian Empire, dedicates one page to Prunus fruticosa, a shrub found in campis Isetensibus, "in the plains of the Iset;" that is, the Siberian steppe. He states the Linnaean synonym, giving the same reference to Bauhin, but makes the variety into a species, Pr. fruticosa. The last paragraph of Page 19 states his reasons for the classification, which have nothing to do with the name, but are in true Linnaean cryptic form, in this case a pun.

The two Latin words of the pun are fructus or frux, from fruor, "enjoy" – a fruit is a result enjoyed – and frutex, "shrub", adjective fruticosus, "bushy", from a totally different root. Prunus is a grammatical feminine, so Prunus fruticosa agrees in gender. However, Pallas says Haec mihi tantum fructibus suis innotuit, qui distinctam itidem speciem indicare videntur, "It came to my attention at last because of its fruit, which repeatedly seemed to indicate a distinct species." The fruit seemed fere Pruni forma, "nearly in the form of Prunus", especially because praedita oblongo nucleo, "furnished with an oblong seed." So, Pallas moved it from Cerasus to Prunus.

Woronow

In 1925 Yury Nikolaevich Voronov, known botanically as (Ju.N, G., G.N. or GJN) Woronow, made an unsuccessful effort to retain Cerasus as a genus name and move fruticosa to it, creating another synonym, Cerasus fruticosa.

== Hybridisation and genetic erosion ==
Prunus fruticosa, a tetraploid with 2n=32 chromosomes, is thought to be one of the parent species of Prunus cerasus (the sour cherry) by way of ancient crosses between it and Prunus avium (the wild/sweet cherry) in the areas where the two species overlap. Both species can interbreed with each other, as well as with Prunus cerasus. Prunus cerasus is now a species in its own right having developed beyond a hybrid and stabilized.

A recent study of native Prunus fruticosa stands in northern Poland finds that it is disappearing there by "genetic erosion" or "disappearance of typical morphological characters". It hybridizes naturally with Prunus cerasus to form Prunus × eminens, and with Prunus avium to form Prunus × stacei.

These forest plants are brought into closer contact with Prunus fruticosa by the modern disappearance of "contemporaneous sites of the steppe relics" once common in northern Poland, due to forest management since the 18th century, and the planting of stands of Prunus cerasus, which are more prolific in pollen.
