= North Star cherry =

Edible fruit cultivar

- Genus: Prunus
- Species: Prunus × eminens
- Cultivar: 'North Star'
- Breeder: University of Minnesota,

The North Star cherry is a sour cherry tree. A dwarf cultivar, it typically grows 8 to 10 feet tall. Both the skin and flesh are a deep red. The North Star is excellent for baking, and makes superb wine.

Developed by the University of Minnesota, (the "North Star State"), it is self-pollinizing (meaning only one tree is necessary). Cold-resistant, it is a heavy producer of mahogany-red, medium-sized fruit. In recent years, it has become a popular cherry variety for yards and gardens, as well as home cooking.
