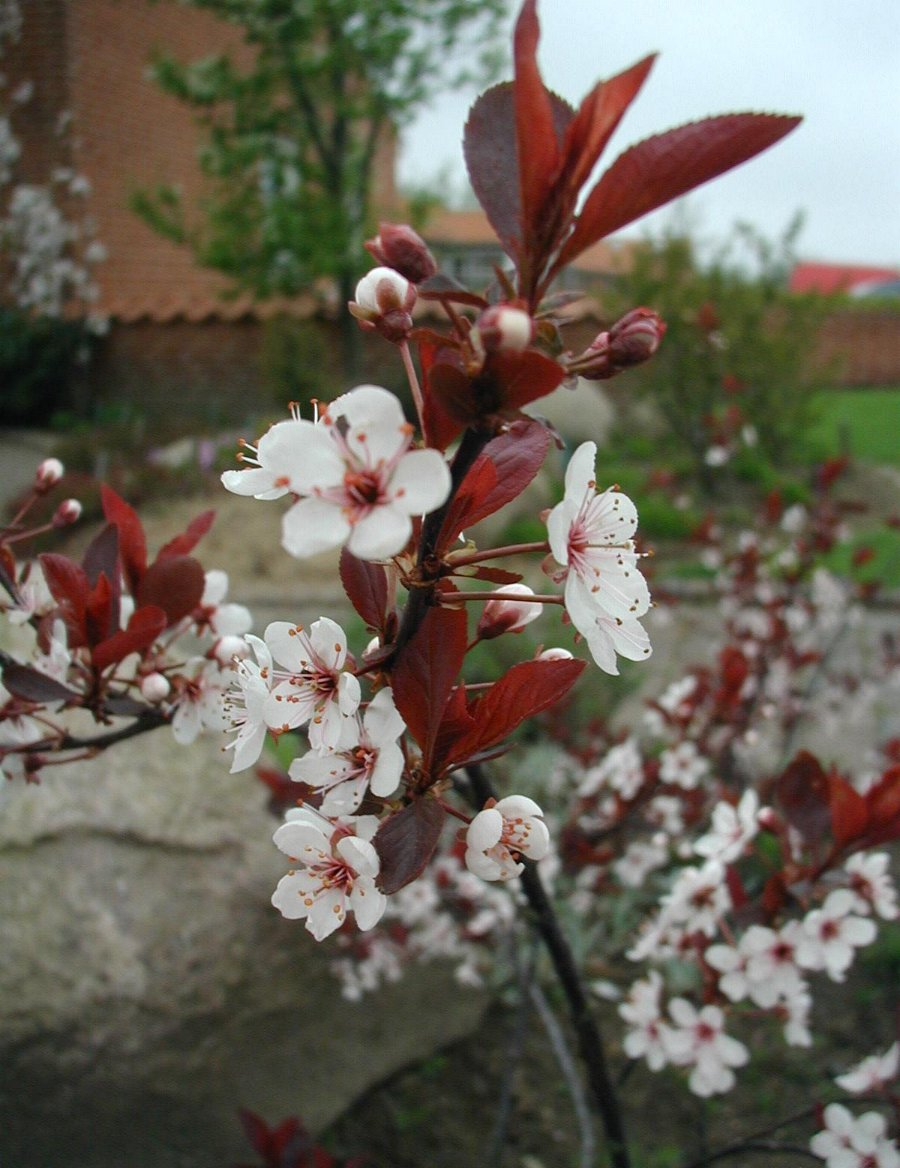

Scientific classification
- Kingdom: Plantae
- Clade: Tracheophytes
- Clade: Angiosperms
- Clade: Eudicots
- Clade: Rosids
- Order: Rosales
- Family: Rosaceae
- Genus: Prunus
- Subgenus: Prunus subg. Prunus
- Species: P. × cistena

Binomial name
- Prunus × cistena (N.E.Hansen) Koehne

= Prunus × cistena =

Species of flowering plant

Prunus × cistena, the purple leaf sand cherry or dwarf red-leaf plum, is a hybrid species of Prunus, the result of a cross between Prunus cerasifera (cherry plum or myrobalan plum) and Prunus pumila (sand cherry). A leggy bush or shrubby tree, it typically reaches a height of 1.5–2.5 meters (5–8 ft) and has a useful life of 10–20 years. The fruits are edible, if strong-tasting. Some people make jams or preserves from them. It is not advisable to eat the pits.

Frost-tolerant, purple leaf sand cherries can be grown up to USDA Hardiness Zone 2a. Commercial specimens are typically grafted to a rootstock from any of a number of other species, which will influence their growth form and final height. There are also a limited selection of cultivars available.

Prunus × cistena was developed by Niels Ebbesen Hansen in 1910. In 1993 it won the Royal Horticultural Society's Award of Garden Merit.

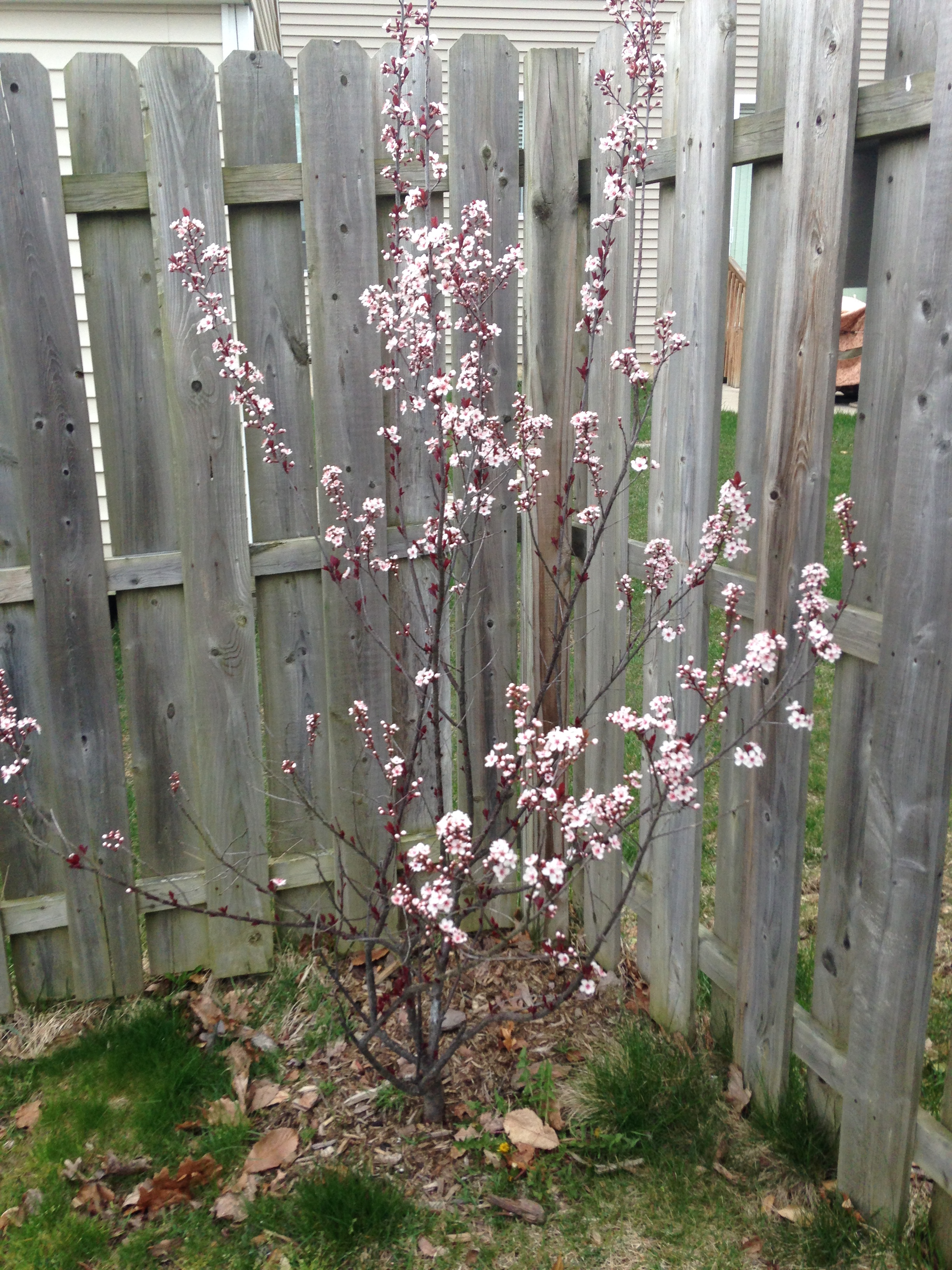
In bloom in a garden setting
