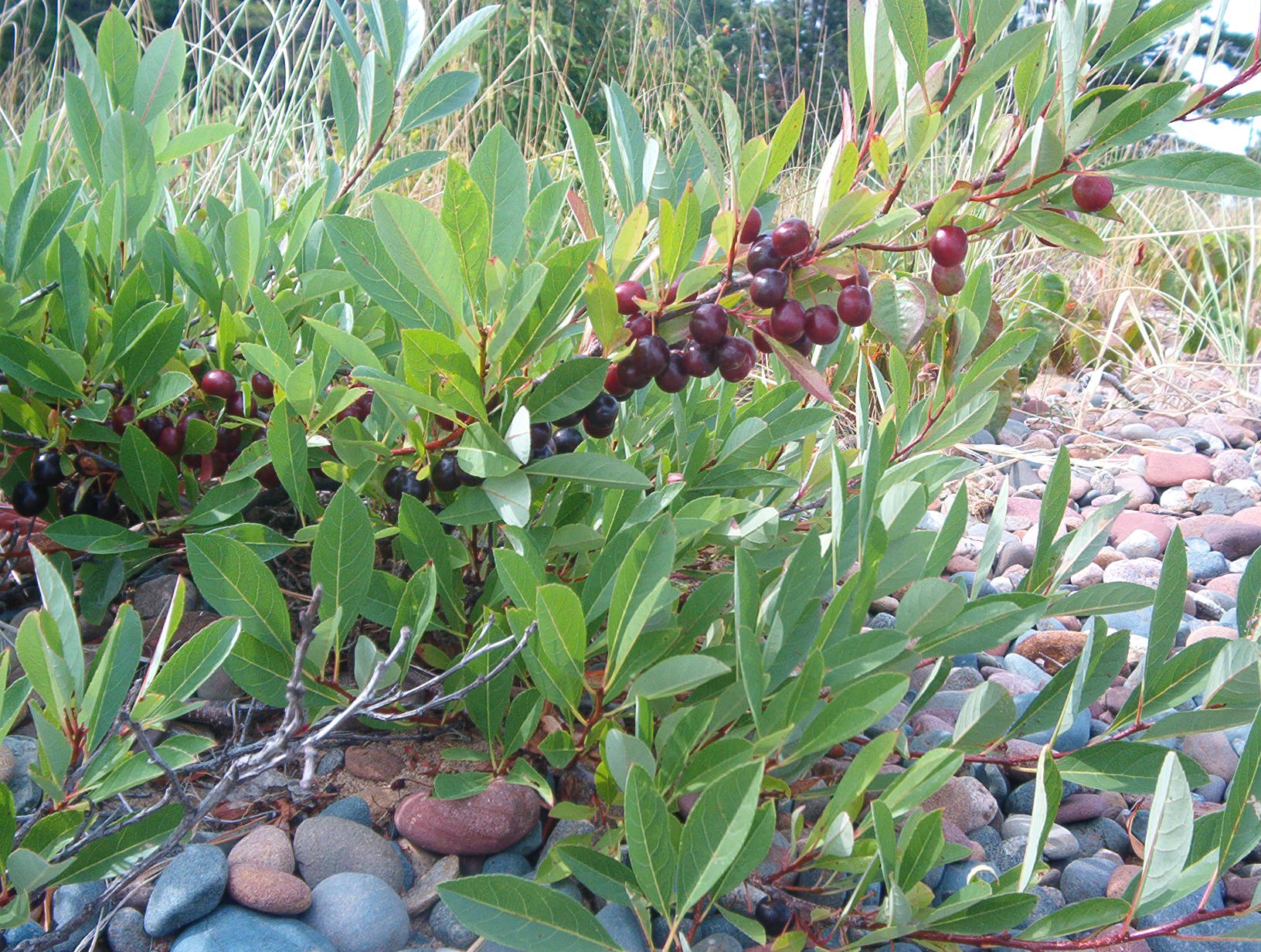
- Fruit in late July.

Conservation status
- Least Concern (IUCN 3.1)

Scientific classification
- Kingdom: Plantae
- Clade: Tracheophytes
- Clade: Angiosperms
- Clade: Eudicots
- Clade: Rosids
- Order: Rosales
- Family: Rosaceae
- Genus: Prunus
- Subgenus: Prunus subg. Prunus
- Section: Prunus sect. Microcerasus
- Species: P. pumila

Binomial name
- Prunus pumila L.

Synonyms
- List: Prunus besseyi L.H.Bailey; Prunus cerasa Crantz; Prunus cuneata Raf.; Prunus floribunda K. Koch; Prunus depressa hort Pursh; Prunus prunella Daniels; Prunus rosebudii Reagan; Prunus susquehanae hort. ex Willd.; Cerasus pumila (L.) Michx.; Microcerasus pumila (L.) Eremin & Yushev; Cerasus besseyi (L.H.Bailey) Smyth; Cerasus depressa (Pursh) Ser.

= Prunus pumila =

North American species of cherry in the rose family

Prunus pumila, commonly called sand cherry, is a North American species of cherry, part of the rose family.

== Description ==
Prunus pumila is a deciduous shrub that grows to 0.6–1.8 metres (2–6 feet) tall depending on the variety. It forms dense clonal colonies by sprouts from the root system. The leaves are leathery, 4–7 centimetres (1 5/8–2 3/4 inches) long, with a serrated margin.

The flowers are 15–25 millimetres (9/16–1 in) in diameter with five white petals and 25–30 stamens. They are produced in small clusters of two to four. The fruit is a small cherry 13–15 mm (1/2–9/16 in) in diameter, ripening to dark purple in early summer.

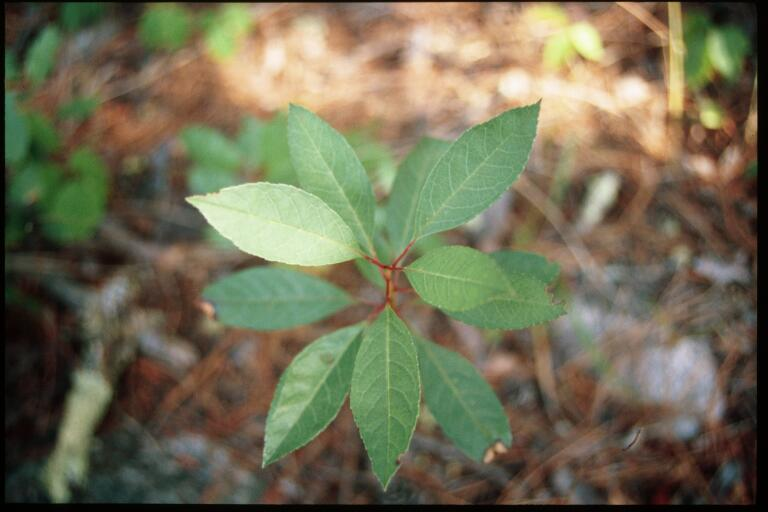
Close-up of leaves

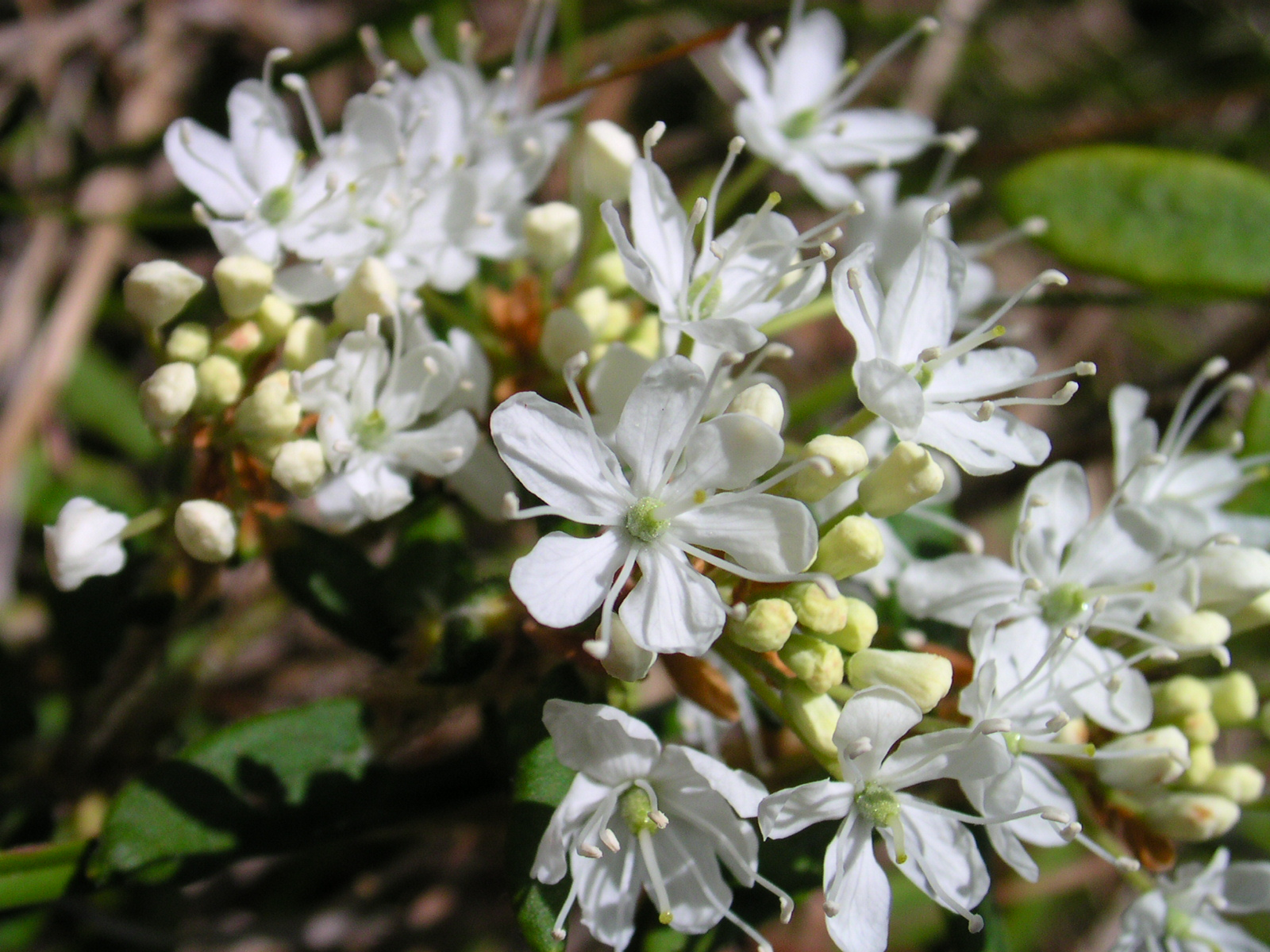
Mature flowers

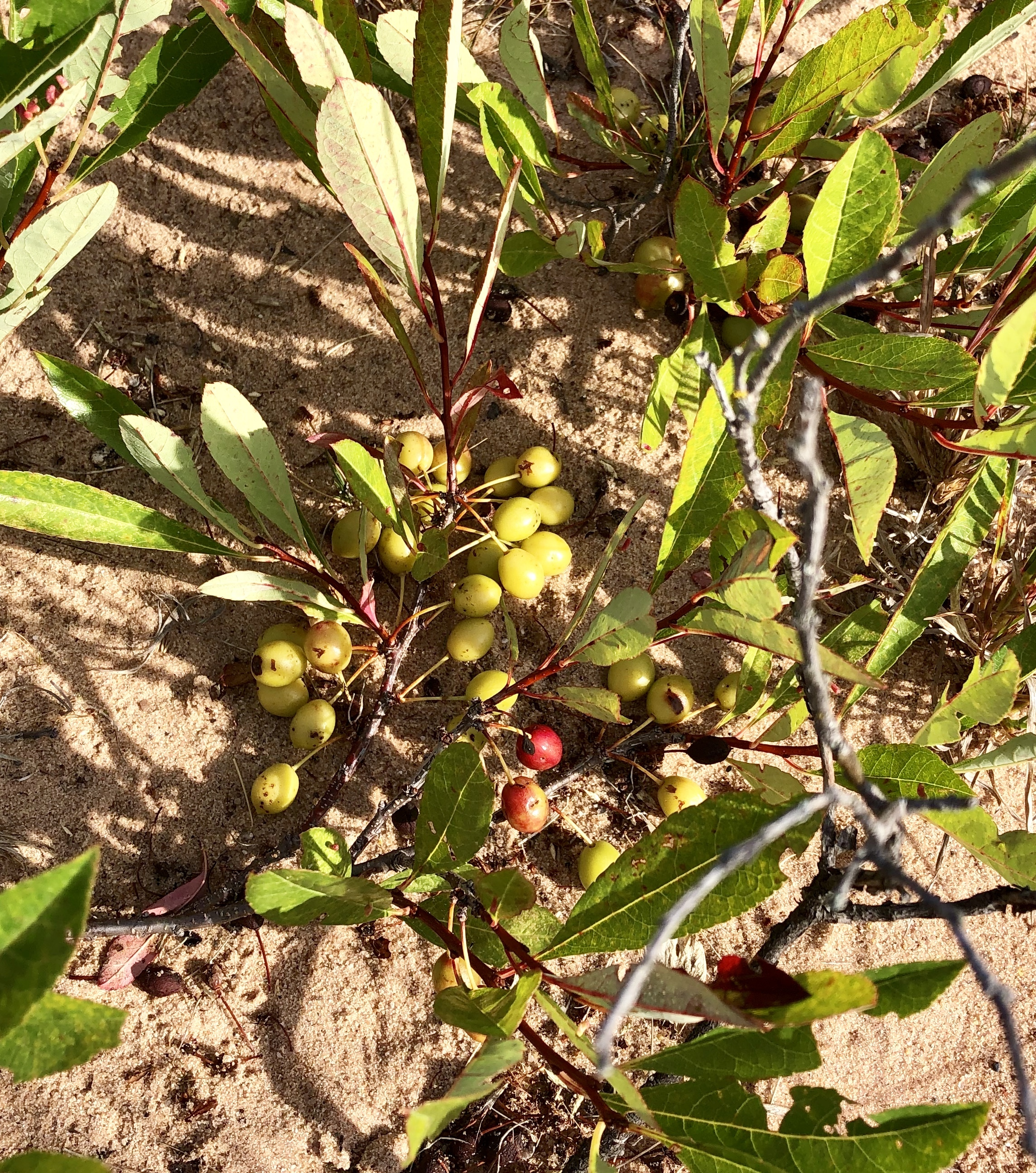
Cherries (mostly unripe) growing on branches

== Taxonomy ==
Varieties of the species include:

- Prunus pumila var. besseyi (Bailey) Gleason, western sand cherry (also called Rocky Mountain cherry) – Saskatchewan, Manitoba, western Ontario, south to Colorado and Kansas
- Prunus pumila var. depressa (Pursh) Gleason, eastern sand cherry – Ontario, Québec, New Brunswick south to Pennsylvania
- Prunus pumila var. pumila, Great Lakes sand cherry – shores of Great Lakes
- Prunus pumila var. susquehanae (hort. ex Willd.) Jaeger, Susquehana sand cherry – from Manitoba east to Maine, south to Tennessee
- Prunus × cistena (purple leaf sand cherry) is a hybrid of Prunus cerasifera (cherry plum) and P. pumila. It was developed by Niels Ebbesen Hansen of South Dakota State University in 1910. They grow to be about 2.1 m (7 ft) tall and can live for up to 20 years.
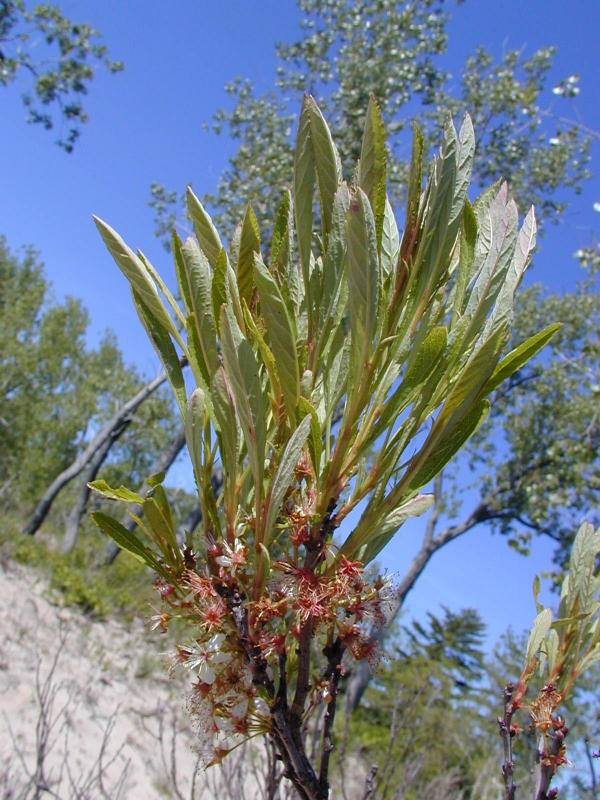
P. pumila var. pumila just after flowering, in June

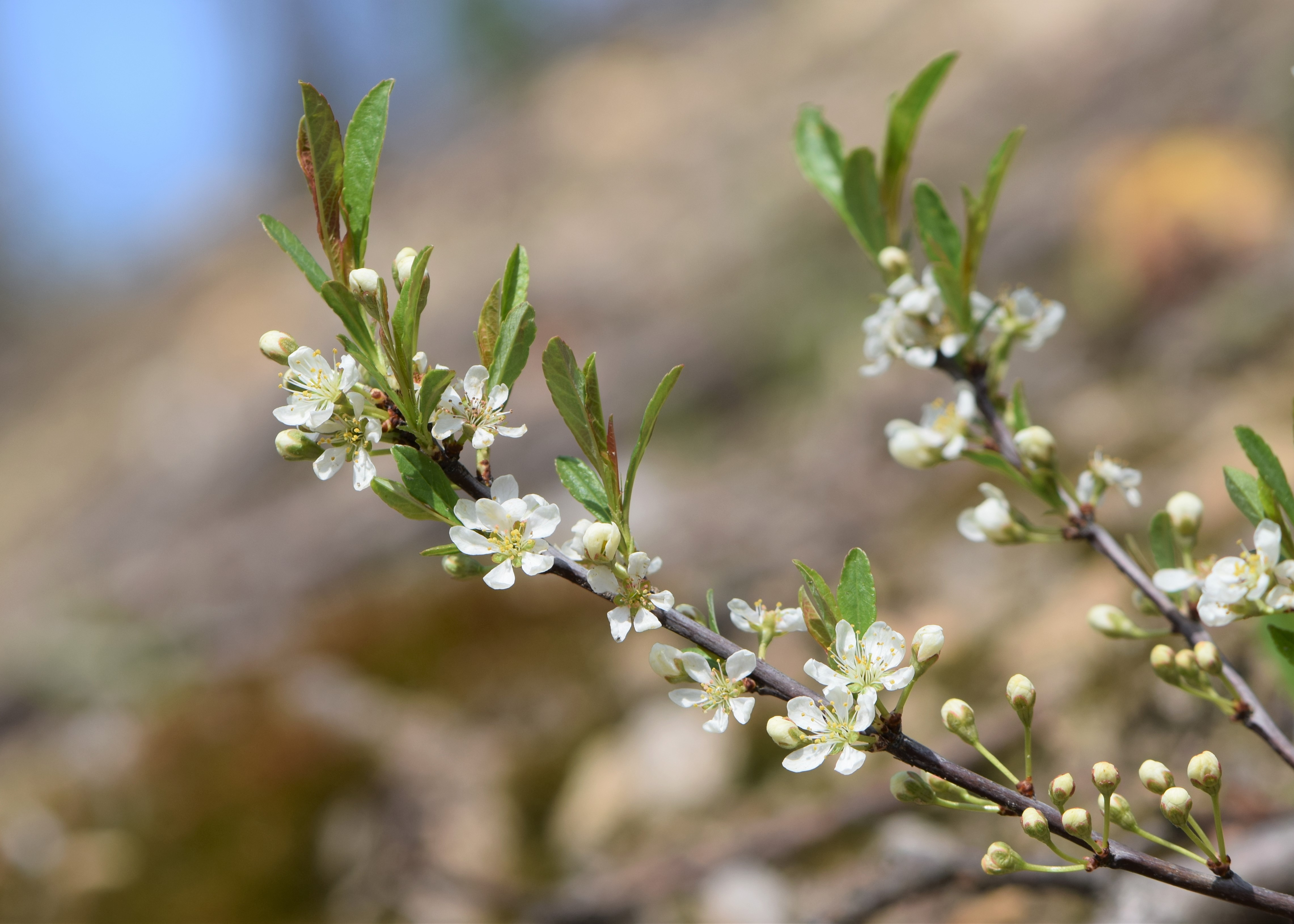
P. pumila var. depressa in bloom

== Distribution and habitat ==
It is widespread in eastern and central Canada from New Brunswick west to Saskatchewan and the northern United States from Maine to Montana, south as far as Colorado, Kansas, Indiana, and Virginia, with a few isolated populations in Tennessee and Utah. It grows in sandy locations such as shorelines and dunes.
