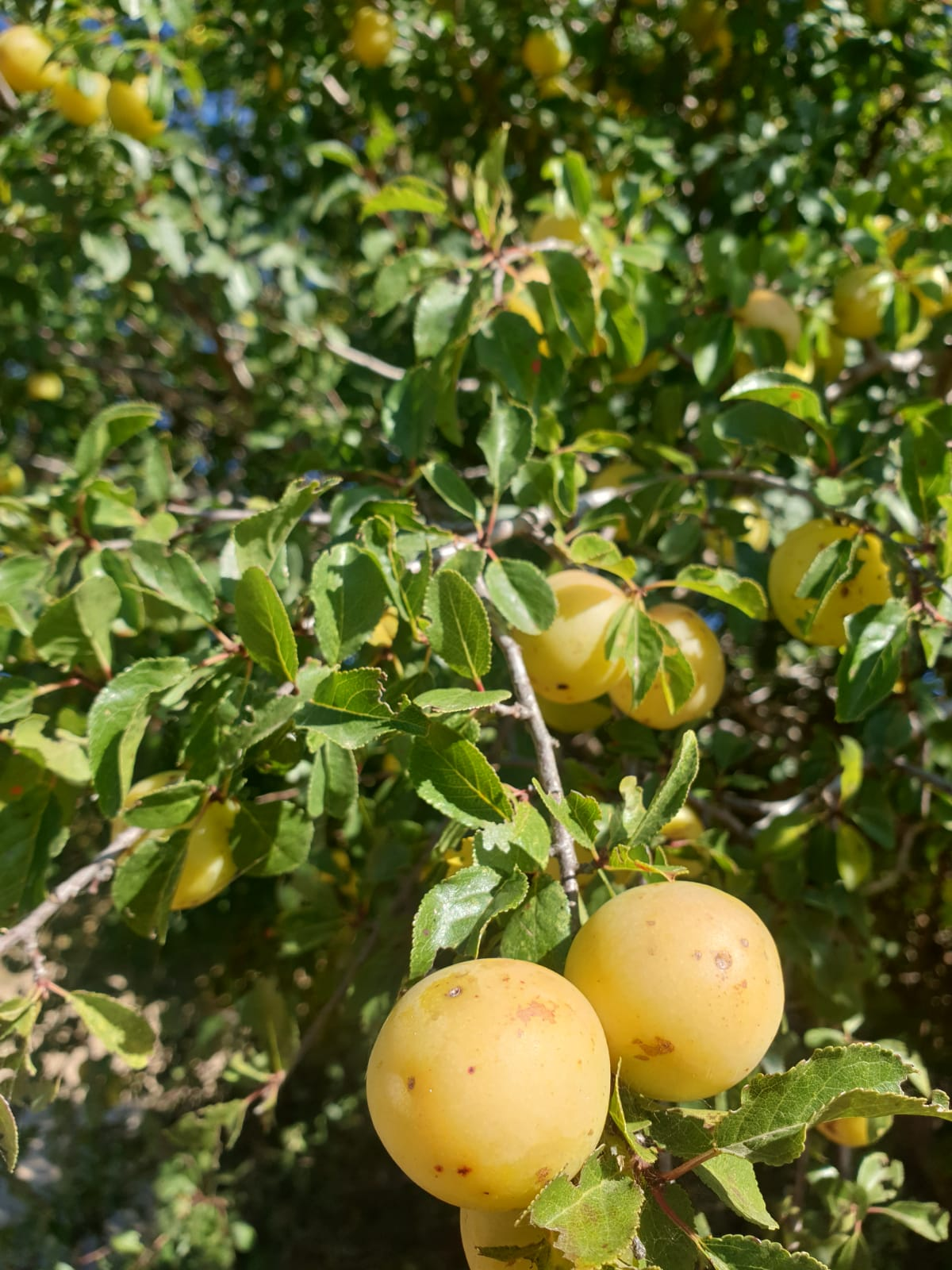

Conservation status
- Least Concern (IUCN 3.1)

Scientific classification
- Kingdom: Plantae
- Clade: Tracheophytes
- Clade: Angiosperms
- Clade: Eudicots
- Clade: Rosids
- Order: Rosales
- Family: Rosaceae
- Genus: Prunus
- Subgenus: Prunus subg. Prunus
- Section: Prunus sect. Prunus
- Species: P. cocomilia

Binomial name
- Prunus cocomilia Ten.

Synonyms
- Prunus brutia N.Terracc.; Prunus pseudoarmeniaca Heldr. & Sartori

= Prunus cocomilia =

Italian plum

Species of plant

Prunus cocomilia is a species of plum commonly called Italian plum. It is native to Albania, Croatia, Greece, southern Italy (including Sicily), Montenegro, North Macedonia, Serbia, and western Turkey.
