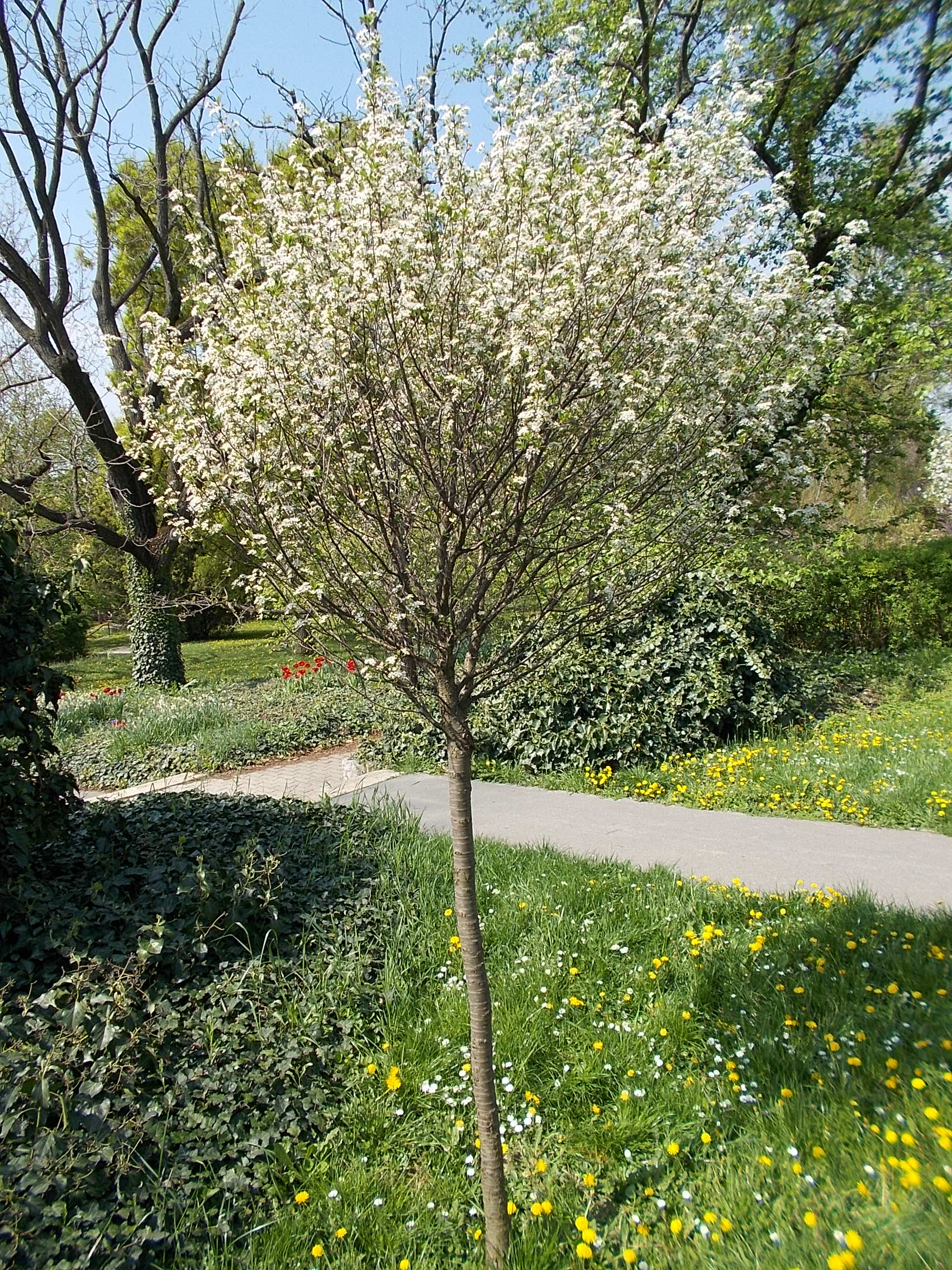
- Prunus × eminens 'Umbraculifera' in bloom at the Buda Arboretum in Hungary

Scientific classification
- Kingdom: Plantae
- Clade: Tracheophytes
- Clade: Angiosperms
- Clade: Eudicots
- Clade: Rosids
- Order: Rosales
- Family: Rosaceae
- Genus: Prunus
- Species: P. × eminens

Binomial name
- Prunus × eminens Beck

Synonyms
- Cerasus × eminens (Beck) Buia; Cerasus eminens (G.Beck) Buia; Cerasus eminens (G.Beck) J.Dostál; Cerasus intermedia Loisel.; Cerasus klokovii Sobko; Prunus × javorkae Kárpáti; Cerasus × javorkae

= Prunus × eminens =

Species of tree

Prunus × eminens or Prunus eminens is a species of small cherry tree native to central Europe. (Note: in German it is called mittlere Weichsel, meaning "semisour cherry", and in Hungarian it called gömbmeggy meaning "ball cherry" or gömb csepleszmeggy meaning "ball drooping cherry") It is a naturally occurring hybrid of sour cherry, Prunus cerasus, and dwarf cherry, Prunus fruticosa, occasionally found where their ranges overlap. Like its parents, it is a tetraploid with 32 chromosomes. It is forming a hybrid swarm with, and threatening to extirpate, P. fruticosa in much of its western range through genetic pollution.

== Description ==
It is difficult to distinguish P. × eminens from P. fruticosa based on vegetative characters alone. This task is made even more complicated by the high level of genetic introgression from P. × eminens to P. fruticosa, such that pure specimens of P. fruticosa might not be available for comparison. It is a small tree, usually 3 to 5 m tall, with very rare specimens reaching 7 m. The crown is spherical. The white flowers are about 1.5 cm wide, and the fruits are a crimson red. The small ovate leaves turn a vibrant orange in the fall.

== Distribution and habitat ==
P. × eminens takes after P. fruticosa in preferring open, steppe-like habitat, although it also grows in forest edges. In the wild it is chiefly found in central Europe, in the western part of the range of P. fruticosa and largely over-lapping and supplanting it there.

== Cultivation ==
Canadian researchers have crossed the parent species and selected the offspring to create cultivars which are marketed as Mongolian cherry (Note: Prunus fruticosa is also called Mongolian cherry) or dwarf sour cherry by commercial nurseries. A further backcross of P. cerasus with P. × eminens has yielded a cultivar dubbed 'SK Carmine Jewel', with follow-on cultivars 'Crimson Passion', 'Juliet' and 'Romeo', which produce cherries at the northernmost limits of viable Prunus production. These cultivars have a tidy spherical growth habit, are very cold hardy (to USDA Hardiness Zone 4a or better), and their high sugar content fruit makes good pies, jams and jellies. A cultivar named Prunus × eminens 'Umbraculifera', with a slightly weeping form when mature, is commercially available as an ornamental. (Note: some sources opine that the ornamental cultivar called Prunus fruticosa 'Globosa' is a synonym of Prunus × eminens 'Umbraculifera') Unlike the agricultural cultivars, 'Umbraculifera' is not a heavy fruit producer, but produces sufficient pollen to be useful for honey production.

== Uses ==
Some tests have been conducted to assay its usefulness as a dwarfing rootstock for other Prunus species. The small size and spherical growth form of P. × eminens 'Umbraculifera', and its autumn finery and cold hardiness make it useful as a street tree. It does well in containers and on green roofs. It is planted in cities from Sweden to Hungary and Ukraine. Commercial nurseries graft the compact spherical crowns to other Prunus stems to produce taller standard forms with a lollipop-like appeal.
