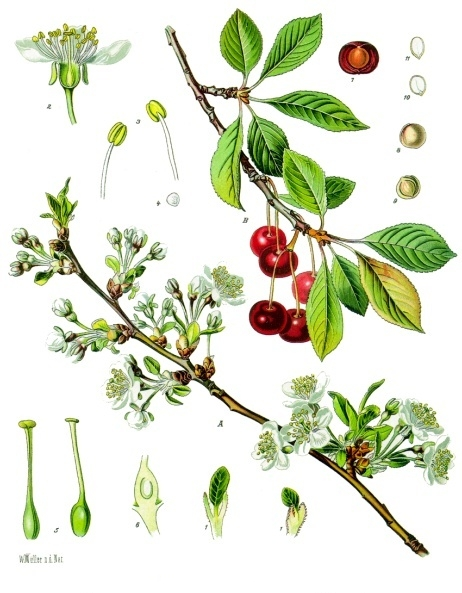
- Illustration of Prunus cerasus

Scientific classification
- Kingdom: Plantae
- Clade: Tracheophytes
- Clade: Angiosperms
- Clade: Eudicots
- Clade: Rosids
- Order: Rosales
- Family: Rosaceae
- Genus: Prunus
- Subgenus: Prunus subg. Cerasus (Mill.) A.Gray, 1856

Species
- See text

= Prunus subg. Cerasus =

True cherries

Subgenus of trees

Prunus subg. Cerasus is a subgenus of Prunus, commonly known as the true cherries. Species of the subgenus have a single winter bud per axil. (Note: The species originally included in this subgenus with three axillary winter buds have been moved into the subgenus Prunus.) The flowers are usually in small corymbs or umbels of several together (occasionally solitary, e.g. P. serrula), but some species have short racemes (e.g. P. maacki). The fruit is a drupe and has no obvious groove along the side. The subgenus is native to the temperate regions of the Northern Hemisphere, with two species in North America (P. emarginata and P. pensylvanica), four in Europe (P. avium, P. cerasus, P. fruticosa and P. mahaleb), two in North Africa (P. avium and P. mahaleb), and the remainder in Asia.

The fresh fruits of sweet cherry (worldwide) and Chinese cherry (in China) are consumed raw. The fruits of some species such as sour cherry are used to make desserts, sauce, jam and wine. The seeds of mahaleb cherry are used to make mahleb. Many species are cultivated as an ornamental tree, known as cherry blossoms.

== Species ==
Species of Prunus subg. Cerasus are known as true cherries, which include:

- Prunus apetala (Siebold & Zucc.) Franch. & Sav. – clove cherry
- Prunus avium (L.) L. – sweet cherry, wild cherry, mazzard or gean
- Prunus campanulata Maxim. – bell-flowered cherry, Taiwan cherry or Formosan cherry
- Prunus canescens Bois. – grey-leaf cherry
- Prunus caudata Franch. – caudate cherry
- Prunus cerasoides D. Don. – wild Himalayan cherry
- Prunus cerasus L. – sour cherry
- Prunus clarofolia C.K.Schneid. – shiny-leaf cherry
- Prunus conadenia Koehne
- Prunus conradinae Koehne
- Prunus crataegifolia Hand.-Mazz. – hawthorn-leaf cherry
- Prunus cyclamina Koehne – cyclamen cherry or Chinese flowering cherry
- Prunus discadenia Koehne
- Prunus discoidea (T.T.Yu & C.L.Li) Z.Wei & Y.B.Chang
- Prunus dolichadenia Cardot
- Prunus emarginata (Douglas ex Hook.) Walp. – bitter cherry or Oregon cherry
- Prunus fruticosa Pall. – European dwarf cherry, dwarf cherry, Mongolian cherry or steppe cherry
- Prunus hainanensis (G.A.Fu & Y.S.Lin) H.Yu, N.H.Xia & H.G.Ye – Hainan cherry
- Prunus harae H.Ohba & S.Akiyama
- Prunus hefengensis (X.R.Wang & C.B.Shang) Y.H.Tong & N.H.Xia – Hefeng cherry
- Prunus henryi (C.K.Schneid.) Koehne
- Prunus himalaica Kitam. – Nepalese cherry
- Prunus incisa Thunb. – Fuji cherry
- Prunus itosakura Siebold
- Prunus jamasakura Siebold ex Koidz. – Japanese mountain cherry or Japanese hill cherry
- Prunus leveilleana Koehne (syn. Prunus verecunda (Koidz.) Koehne) – Korean mountain cherry
- Prunus maackii Rupr. (syn. Prunus glandulifolia Rupr. & Maxim.) – Manchurian cherry
- Prunus mahaleb L. – Saint Lucie cherry, rock cherry, perfumed cherry or mahaleb cherry
- Prunus matuurai Sasaki – Taiping Mountain cherry
- Prunus maximowiczii Rupr. – Miyama cherry or Korean cherry
- Prunus mugus Hand.-Mazz.
- Prunus nipponica Matsum. – Takane cherry, peak cherry or Japanese alpine cherry
- Prunus pananensis Z.L.Chen, W.J.Chen & X.F.Jin – Pan'an cherry
- Prunus patentipila Hand.-Mazz.
- Prunus pensylvanica L.f. – pin cherry, fire cherry, or wild red cherry
- Prunus pleiocerasus Koehne
- Prunus polytricha Koehne
- Prunus pseudocerasus Lindl. – Chinese cherry or Chinese sour cherry
- Prunus pusilliflora Cardot
- Prunus rufa Wall ex Hook.f. – Himalayan cherry
- Prunus rufoides C.K.Schneid. (syn. Prunus dielsiana C.K. Schneid.) – tailed-leaf cherry
- Prunus sargentii Rehder – northern Japanese hill cherry, northern Japanese mountain cherry or Sargent's cherry
- Prunus schneideriana Koehne
- Prunus serrula Franch. – paperbark cherry, birch bark cherry or Tibetan cherry
- Prunus serrulata Lindl. – Japanese cherry, hill cherry, Oriental cherry or East Asian cherry
- Prunus shikokuensis (Moriya) H.Kubota – Shikoku cherry
- Prunus singalilaensis H.Ohba & S.Akiyama – Singalila cherry
- Prunus speciosa (Koidz.) Ingram – Oshima cherry
- Prunus stipulacea Maxim.
- Prunus sunhangii D.G.Zhang & T.Deng
- Prunus szechuanica Batalin – Sichuan cherry
- Prunus takasagomontana Sasaki
- Prunus takesimensis Nakai – Ulleungdo cherry
- Prunus taplejungnica H.Ohba & S.Akiyama – Taplejung cherry
- Prunus tatsienensis Batalin – Kangding cherry
- Prunus topkegolensis H.Ohba & S.Akiyama – Topke Gola cherry
- Prunus transarisanensis Hayata – Alishan cherry
- Prunus trichantha Koehne
- Prunus trichostoma Koehne
- Prunus veitchii Koehne ()
- Prunus xingshanensis Huan C.Wang – Xingshan cherry
- Prunus yaoiana (W.L.Cheng) Y.H.Tong & N.H.Xia
- Prunus yunnanensis Franch. – Yunnan cherry

Nothospecies in this subgenus include:

- Prunus × chichibuensis H.Kubota & Moriya – Chichibu cherry
- Prunus × compta (Koidz.) Tatew.
- Prunus × dawyckensis Sealy
- Prunus × eminens Beck
- Prunus × fontanesiana (Spach) C.K.Schneid.
- Prunus × furuseana Ohwi
- Prunus × gondouinii (Poit. & Turpin) Rehder
- Prunus × hisauchiana Koidz. ex Hisauti
- Prunus × incam Ingram ex R.T.Olsen & Whittem.
- Prunus × javorkae Kárpáti
- Prunus × juddii E.S.Anderson
- Prunus × kanzakura Makino
- Prunus × kubotana Kawas.
- Prunus × lannesiana (Carrière) E.H.Wilson
- Prunus × mitsuminensis Moriya
- Prunus × miyasakana H.Kubota
- Prunus × mohacsyana Kárpáti
- Prunus × nudiflora (Koehne) Koidz.
- Prunus × oneyamensis Hayashi
- Prunus × parvifolia (Matsum.) Koehne – small-leaved cherry
- Prunus × pugetensis Jacobson & Zika – Puget Sound cherry
- Prunus × sacra Miyoshi
- Prunus × schmittii Rehder
- Prunus × sieboldii (Carrière) Wittm.
- Prunus × stacei Wójcicki
- Prunus × subhirtella Miq. – Higan cherry or spring cherry
- Prunus × syodoi Nakai
- Prunus × tschonoskii Koehne
- Prunus × yedoensis Matsum. – Yoshino cherry or Tokyo cherry
- Prunus × yuyamae Sugim.

Many Prunus species are called "cherries" but not included in this subgenus. They are not considered true cherries. Examples are:

- Bush cherries which have three winter buds per axil, such as Oriental bush cherry (P. japonica), humble bush cherry (P. humilis), Nanking cherry (P. tomentosa) and prostrate cherry (P. prostrata), are now included in Prunus subg. Prunus. Sand cherry (P. pumila) also belongs to P. subg. Prunus.
- Bird cherries (e.g. P. padus, P. grayana, P. napaulensis, P. ssiori), chokecherry (P. virginiana), black cherry (P. serotina), cherry laurels (e.g. P. laurocerasus, P. myrtifolia, P. pleuradenia), hollyleaf cherry (P. ilicifolia) and Catalina cherry (P. i. subsp. lyonii) whose flowers and fruits are borne on racemes belong to P. subg. Padus.
- The phylogenetic position of African cherry (P. africana) is still uncertain, but it is definitely not a true cherry species.
