= American bird cherry =

American bird cherry may refer to:

- Prunus serotina
- Prunus pensylvanica
