= Prunus × schmittii =

Scientific classification
- Kingdom: Plantae
- Clade: Tracheophytes
- Clade: Angiosperms
- Clade: Eudicots
- Clade: Rosids
- Order: Rosales
- Family: Rosaceae
- Genus: Prunus
- Subgenus: Prunus subg. Cerasus
- Section: P. sect. Cerasus
- Species: P. × schmittii

Binomial name
- Prunus × schmittii Rehder

Synonyms
- Prunus schmittii Rehder

Hybrid species of tree

Prunus × schmittii, Schmitt's cherry, is a nothospecies of flowering cherry that is the result of a cross between Prunus canescens (gray-leaf cherry) and Prunus avium (sweet cherry). It is useful as a street tree in narrow spaces due to its very slender, conical growth form.

Debuting in 1923, P. × schmittii is a fast-growing tree, typically reaching 7 to 12 m, 15 m in favorable spots. Its small, pale pink star- or propeller-shaped flowers arrive in April and attract bees and other pollinators due to their heavy production of pollen. Its small red drupes are relished by birds. The shiny decorative bark is a mahogany brown with prominent horizontal lenticels. The fall foliage is orange-yellow. Multi- and single- stem varieties are available from commercial nurseries.
