= Prunus veitchii =

Scientific classification
- Kingdom: Plantae
- Clade: Tracheophytes
- Clade: Angiosperms
- Clade: Eudicots
- Clade: Rosids
- Order: Rosales
- Family: Rosaceae
- Genus: Prunus
- Species: P. veitchii

Binomial name
- Prunus veitchii Koehne

Synonyms
- Cerasus concinna (Koehne) Ohle; Cerasus japonica var. zhejiangensis (Y.B.Chang) T.C.Ku ex B.M.Barthol.; Cerasus jingningensis Z.H.Chen, G.Y.Li & Y.K.Xu; Cerasus xueluoensis C.H.Nan & X.R.Wang; Prunus concinna Koehne; Prunus japonica var. zhejiangensis Y.B.Chang; Prunus xueluoensis (C.H.Nan & X.R.Wang) Y.H.Tong & N.H.Xia; Prunus zappeyana Koehne; Prunus zappeyana var. subsimplex Koehne

Species of plant

Prunus veitchii, synonym Prunus xueluoensis, is a species of Prunus found in south-central and southeast China. It is a shrubby tree 0.5 to 3 m tall, preferring to grow at 1100 to 1500 m above sea level. It is morphologically similar to Prunus tomentosa and Prunus tianshanica. It differs from them by a number of features including having two to four flowers per inflorescence, many more stamens per flower, a glabrous pistil and a black fruit. Genetically, P. veitchii (discussed under the synonym P. xueluoensis) is more closely related to P. polytricha, P. jingningensis, and P. pseudocerasus. (Note: Called Cerasus polytricha, Cerasus jingningensis, and Cerasus cantabrigiensis, respectively, by the source.)
