= Prunus rufa =

Scientific classification
- Kingdom: Plantae
- Clade: Tracheophytes
- Clade: Angiosperms
- Clade: Eudicots
- Clade: Rosids
- Order: Rosales
- Family: Rosaceae
- Genus: Prunus
- Subgenus: Prunus subg. Cerasus
- Species: P. rufa

Binomial name
- Prunus rufa Wall. ex Hook.f.

Synonyms
- Prunus ferruginea Wall.; Prunus imanishii (Kitam.) Ghora & Panigrahi

Species of tree

Prunus rufa, called Himalayan cherry, is a species of cherry native to Nepal and Burma. It is used as an ornamental elsewhere for its striking shiny brown bark. It has been found growing at 3,925 m (12,900 ft) above sea level in the Himalayas.

== Description ==
Prunus rufa is a small deciduous tree reaching a height of 5–6 metres (15–20 ft). Its calyx tubes are 11–15 millimetres (7/16–9/16 in) long and its leaf blades are 2.8–5 cm long. The smooth bark is a shiny brown, with prominent horizontal lenticels, similar to the coppery-red bark of the Tibetan cherry, Prunus serrula and similar to but lighter than the mahogany-brown bark of P. himalaica. Its phenotype suggests close affinity with four other Himalayan species of Prunus; P. topkegolensis, P. harae, P. taplejungnica and P. singalilaensis. Some sources consider P. ferruginea to be a synonym.
