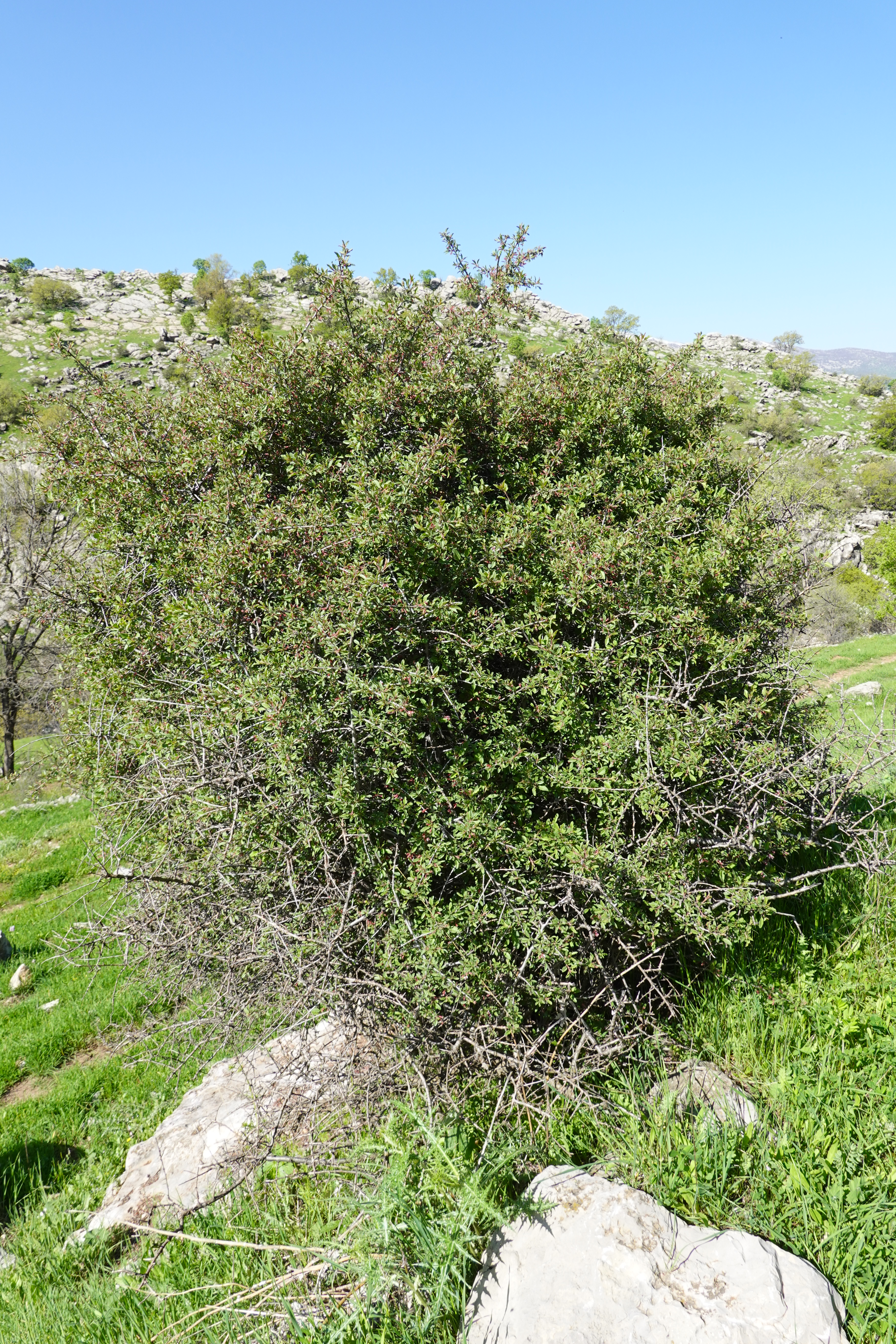

Scientific classification
- Kingdom: Plantae
- Clade: Tracheophytes
- Clade: Angiosperms
- Clade: Eudicots
- Clade: Rosids
- Order: Rosales
- Family: Rosaceae
- Genus: Prunus
- Subgenus: Prunus subg. Cerasus
- Species: P. incana

Binomial name
- Prunus incana (Pall.) Batsch

= Prunus incana =

Species of plant

Prunus incana, the willow leaf cherry (and hoary cherry, although that name is also used for Prunus canescens), is a species of sour cherry native to the Caucasus region of central Asia, including Russia, Armenia, Georgia, Turkey, Kurdistan region of Iraq and Iran. A scrubby plant, it tends to grow on limestone cliffs at elevations around 360-2400 m.

== Uses ==
Prunus incana is used as a rootstock for peach, Prunus persica.
