= Prunus himalaica =

Scientific classification
- Kingdom: Plantae
- Clade: Tracheophytes
- Clade: Angiosperms
- Clade: Eudicots
- Clade: Rosids
- Order: Rosales
- Family: Rosaceae
- Genus: Prunus
- Subgenus: Prunus subg. Cerasus
- Species: P. himalaica

Binomial name
- Prunus himalaica Kitam.

Species of tree

Prunus himalaica is a species of cherry native to Nepal. It is used as an ornamental elsewhere for its attractive shiny mahogany-brown bark. It prefers to grow at about 3,900 m above sea level in the Himalayas.

== Description ==
Prunus himalaica is a small deciduous tree or shrub reaching a height of at most 5.5 m. The smooth bark is a shiny brown, with prominent horizontal lenticels, similar to the coppery-red bark of the Tibetan cherry, Prunus serrula, and similar to but darker than the brown bark of Prunus rufa. Its younger branches are more purple in color, with brownish-red pubescent coats. The leaves are 4 to 5 cm wide and 6 to 8 cm long, elliptic in shape, with their upper surfaces bright green and with some minute hairs, while the undersides are pale green with abundant brown hairs on the veins, including the 9 to 13 secondary veins. Leaves have biserrate margins, with caudate to acuminate apices and rounded bases, mounted on a 1 cm pubescent petiole. P. himalaica inflorescences are umbellate with one or two flowers attached by 3.5 to 4.5 cm pubescent pedicels. The glabrous hypanthia are about 1 cm long, and the ovate and glandular-serrate 0.4 cm sepals are often reflexed. Petals are a pale pink. Each flower has about 45 stamens.

== As an ornamental ==
All Prunus himalaica grown as ornamentals outside their native range descend from a single individual obtained in 1965 from the Langtang Valley in Nepal by Tony Schilling.
