= Dihydrowogonin =

Names
- IUPAC name 5,7-dihydroxy-8-methoxy-2-phenyl-2,3-dihydrochromen-4-one
- Other names 5,7-Dihydroxy-8-methoxyflavanone

Identifiers
| CAS Number | 4431-41-8 |
| 3D model (JSmol) | Interactive image |
| ChEBI | CHEBI:174734 |
| ChemSpider | 9666238 |
| PubChem CID | 11491431 |
- InChI: InChI=1S/C16H14O5/c1-20-15-12(19)7-10(17)14-11(18)8-13(21-16(14)15)9-5-3-2-4-6-9/h2-7,13,17,19H,8H2,1H3 Key: FKAOWOSRYSMEBS-ZDUSSCGKSA-N
- SMILES: O=C1C=2C(=C(OC)C(O)=CC2O)O[C@@H](C1)C3=CC=CC=C3

Properties
| Chemical formula | C_{16}H_{14}O_{5} |
| Molar mass | 286.283 g·mol^{−1} |
- Except where otherwise noted, data are given for materials in their standard state (at 25 °C [77 °F], 100 kPa). Infobox references

Dihydrowogonin is a plant secondary metabolite in the class of flavanones. It has a flavan backbone with a hydroxyl and methoxy functional groups.

Dihydrowogonin is present in the heartwood and bark of Prunus avium (wild cherry). It is a major constituent of the bark extract, and is linked to the extract's antimicrobial and antibiofilm activity. It has also been found in resin that appears to be exuded by the tree in response to bracket fungus, although it is not the major constituent. Both (-)-dihydrowogonin and (+)-dihydrowogonin are present in the wood.

It interacts with the glutathione transferase TvGSTO3S in the white-rot fungus Trametes versicolor.

== See also ==
- Wogonin
