= Oroxindin =

Names
- IUPAC name 5-Hydroxy-8-methoxy-4-oxoflav-2-en-7-yl β-D-glucopyranosiduronic acid
- Systematic IUPAC name (2S,3S,4S,5R,6S)-3,4,5-Trihydroxy-6-[(5-hydroxy-8-methoxy-4-oxo-2-phenyl-4H-1-benzopyran-7-yl)oxy]oxane-2-carboxylic acid
- Other names Wogonin-7-O-β-D-glucuronide

Identifiers
CAS Number	51059-44-0
3D model (JSmol)	Interactive image
ChemSpider	2341950
ECHA InfoCard	100.230.643
PubChem CID	3084961
UNII	ETX4944Z3R
CompTox Dashboard (EPA)	DTXSID80199062
- InChI: InChI=1S/C22H20O11/c1-30-18-13(32-22-17(27)15(25)16(26)20(33-22)21(28)29)8-11(24)14-10(23)7-12(31-19(14)18)9-5-3-2-4-6-9/h2-8,15-17,20,22,24-27H,1H3,(H,28,29)/t15-,16-,17+,20-,22+/m0/s1 Key: LNOHXHDWGCMVCO-NTKSAMNMSA-N
- SMILES: COc1c(cc(c2c1oc(cc2=O)c3ccccc3)O)O[C@H]4[C@@H]([C@H]([C@@H]([C@H](O4)C(=O)O)O)O)O

Properties
Chemical formula	C_{22}H_{20}O_{11}
Molar mass	460.388 g/mol
- Except where otherwise noted, data are given for materials in their standard state (at 25 °C [77 °F], 100 kPa). Infobox references

Oroxindin is a flavone, a type of phenolic chemical compound. It is a wogonoside, more accurately a wogonin glucuronide isolated from Oroxylum indicum (Bignoniaceae), Bacopa monnieri (Plantaginaceae), and Holmskioldia sanguinea (Chinese hat plant, Verbenaceae).

== Formation ==
A glucuronosyltransferase anzyme converts wogonin to its glucuronide by adding a sugar acid to one of the phenolic hydroxy group, with uridine diphosphate (UDP) as byproduct:

wogonin
+ UDP-glucuronate
UDP
oroxindin
