= Prunus rufoides =

Scientific classification
- Kingdom: Plantae
- Clade: Embryophytes
- Clade: Tracheophytes
- Clade: Angiosperms
- Clade: Eudicots
- Clade: Rosids
- Order: Rosales
- Family: Rosaceae
- Genus: Prunus
- Subgenus: Prunus subg. Cerasus
- Species: P. rufoides

Binomial name
- Prunus rufoides C.K.Schneid.

Synonyms
- Cerasus dielsiana (C.K.Schneid.) T.T.Yü & C.L.Li; Cerasus dielsiana var. abbreviata (Cardot) T.T.Yü & C.L.Li; Prunus carcharias Koehne; Prunus dielsiana (C.K.Schneid.) Koehne; Prunus dielsiana var. abbreviata Cardot; Prunus dielsiana var. conferta Koehne; Prunus dielsiana var. laxa Koehne; Prunus szechuanica var. dielsiana C.K.Schneid.

Species of tree

Prunus rufoides (syn. Prunus dielsiana), called Diel's cherry, the tawny bark cherry, and in Chinese: 尾叶樱桃, the tailed-leaf cherry, is a species of cherry native to China.

== Description ==
It is shrub or tree growing to 6 metres (20 feet) tall. Its bark is brownish‑gray. The petioles are 0.8 to 1.7 millimetres (1/32 to 1/16 inch) long. The leaves are elliptic to elliptic-obovate, from 6 to 14 centimetres (2 1/4 to 5 1/2 in) long and 2.5 to 4.5 cm (1 to 1 3/4 in) wide. The leaves are a darker green on the top surface, with the underside pilose, even villous on the veins.

The species is hermaphrodite. Typically the umbellate or subumbellate inflorescences have 2 to 6 flowers with white or pink petals. Each flower has 32–36 stamens. The fruit is a red drupe, measuring about 8 mm (5/16 in) in diameter.

== Distribution and habitat ==
Diel's cherry is found in Anhui, Chongqing, Guangdong, Guangxi, Guizhou, Henan, Hubei, Hunan, Jiangsu, Jiangxi, and Sichuan provinces in China.

It generally grows at 500–1,400 m (1,600–4,600 ft) above sea level, but can reach 1,800 m (5,900 ft). It prefers moist, well-drained soil and can tolerate a moderate pH range and little to no shade.

== Ecology ==
The fruits are eaten by masked palm civets (Paguma larvata) and the fruits, leaves and buds are eaten by gray snub-nosed monkeys (Rhinopithecus brelichi).

== Toxicity ==
Members of the genus typically contain hydrogen cyanide in the leaves and seeds, which can be fatal if consumed in quantity.

== Uses ==
The cherry is edible raw or cooked. The seed can also be eaten if not too bitter due to the presence of hydrogen cyanide.
