= Prunus apetala =

Conservation status
- Least Concern (IUCN 3.1)

Scientific classification
- Kingdom: Plantae
- Clade: Tracheophytes
- Clade: Angiosperms
- Clade: Eudicots
- Clade: Rosids
- Order: Rosales
- Family: Rosaceae
- Genus: Prunus
- Subgenus: Prunus subg. Cerasus
- Section: P. sect. Cerasus
- Species: P. apetala

Binomial name
- Prunus apetala (Siebold & Zucc.) Franch. & Sav.

Synonyms
- Cerasus apetala (Sieb. & Zucc.) H.Ohba; Prunus tschonoskii Koehne; Ceraseidos apetala Sieb. & Zucc.; Cerasus apetala f. multipetala (Kawas.) H.Ohba; Cerasus apetala var. monticola T.Kawasaki & H.Koyama; Cerasus apetala var. tetsuyae H.Ohba; Prunus apetala f. multipetala Kawas.; Prunus ceraseidos Koidz.; Prunus ceraseidos Maxim.; Prunus crassipes Koidz.; Prunus crenata Koehne; Prunus matsumurana Koehne

Species of tree

Prunus apetala is a species of flowering cherry in the genus Prunus in the family Rosaceae. It is called clove cherry (Japanese: チョウジザクラ choujizakura), because of its clovebud-shaped calyx. It is native to Japan, centered on the main island, Honshu.

== Description ==
Shrub or small tree.

- Height: To 5.5 m (18 ft).
- Leaves: Obovate leaves reach 5–10 cm (2–4 in) in length. Leaf tips are slender; leaf margins double-toothed. Petioles (leaf stalks) and upper leaf surfaces are hairy.
- Inflorescences: Flowers in May.
  - Petals: Range in color from white to pink; small, 'soon falling'.
  - Calyx: Purple.
  - Stamens: Purple.
  - Pedicels: 1.25-1.9 cm (.5-.75in) in length.
- Fruit: Black in color, roundish-oval in shape.
  - Peduncle: Peduncle (fruit stalk) ranges in length from 2.5 to 3.8 cm (1-1.5 in).

== Etymology ==
Prunus is the ancient Latin name for plum trees. The specific epithet apetala is derived from Greek, meaning 'without petals', due to their habit of dropping off the flowers soon after they are formed.
