= Prunus hainanensis =

Scientific classification
- Kingdom: Plantae
- Clade: Tracheophytes
- Clade: Angiosperms
- Clade: Eudicots
- Clade: Rosids
- Order: Rosales
- Family: Rosaceae
- Genus: Prunus
- Subgenus: Prunus subg. Cerasus
- Species: P. hainanensis

Binomial name
- Prunus hainanensis (G.A.Fu & Y.S.Lin) H.Yu, N.H.Xia & H.G.Ye

Synonyms
- Cerasus hainanensis G.A.Fu & Y.S.Lin

Species of tree

Prunus hainanensis is a species of cherry endemic to Hainan province, China. It is very similar to Prunus campanulata and grows only at 900-1200 m in the Hainan Bawangling National Nature Reserve. It has pink flowers and, accordingly, some potential as an ornamental.
