= Prunus discoidea =

Scientific classification
- Kingdom: Plantae
- Clade: Tracheophytes
- Clade: Angiosperms
- Clade: Eudicots
- Clade: Rosids
- Order: Rosales
- Family: Rosaceae
- Genus: Prunus
- Species: P. discoidea

Binomial name
- Prunus discoidea (T.T.Yu & C.L.Li) Z.Wei & Y.B.Chang

Synonyms
- Cerasus discoidea T.T.Yu & C.L.Li

Species of plant

Prunus discoidea is a species of flowering plant in the family Rosaceae. It is native to southeastern China. A member of the cherry subgenus Cerasus, it is a tree reaching 2.5 to 3.5 m (8 to 11 ft). It is typically found in near streams in valleys and ravines, typically in forests or thickets, at elevations from 200 to 1,100 m (700 to 3,600 ft) above sea level. Two cultivars with attractive blossoms have been derived from wild specimens; 'Yuanchun' and 'Caiyun'.
