= Prunus conadenia =

Scientific classification
- Kingdom: Plantae
- Clade: Tracheophytes
- Clade: Angiosperms
- Clade: Eudicots
- Clade: Rosids
- Order: Rosales
- Family: Rosaceae
- Genus: Prunus
- Subgenus: Prunus subg. Cerasus
- Species: P. conadenia

Binomial name
- Prunus conadenia Koehne

Synonyms
- Cerasus conadenia (Koehne) T. T. Yu & C. L. Li; Prunus macradenia Koehne

Species of tree

Prunus conadenia (Chinese: 锥腺樱桃) is a species of cherry found in Tibet, Gansu, Guizhou, Henan, Qinghai, Shaanxi, Sichuan and Yunnan provinces of China. A shrubby tree 6 to 10 m tall, it prefers to grow in mountain valleys between 2,100 and 3,600 m above sea level. The people of Shangri-La eat its fruit, and Tibetan people burn its wood in the weisang purification ritual.
