= Wogonin =

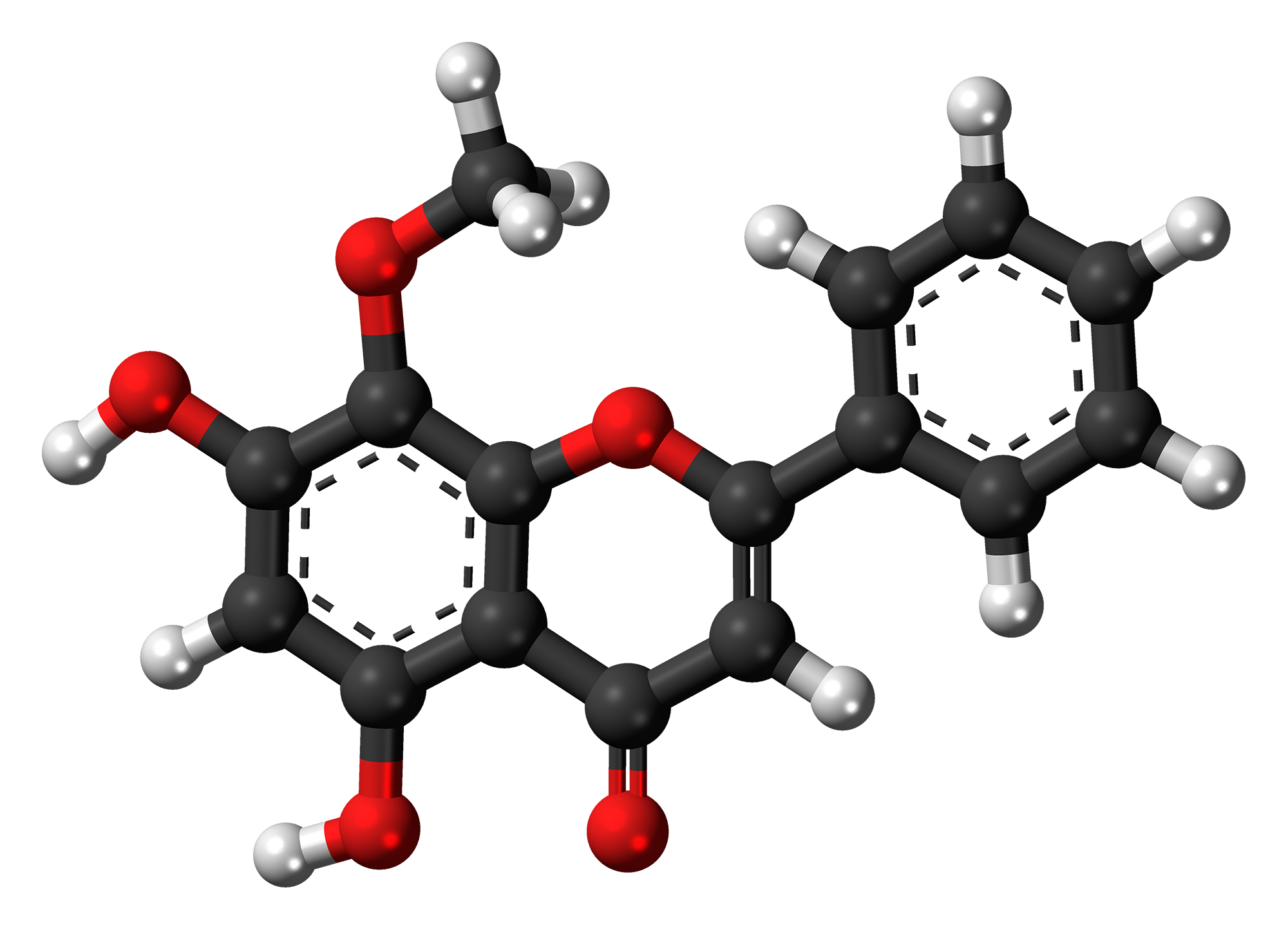

Names
- IUPAC name 5,7-Dihydroxy-8-methoxyflavone
- Systematic IUPAC name 5,7-Dihydroxy-8-methoxy-2-phenyl-4H-1-benzopyran-4-one
- Other names Vogonin; Norwogonin 8-methyl ether

Identifiers
CAS Number	632-85-9
3D model (JSmol)	Interactive image
ChEBI	CHEBI:10043
ChEMBL	ChEMBL16171
ChemSpider	4445020
KEGG	C10197
PubChem CID	5281703
UNII	POK93PO28W
CompTox Dashboard (EPA)	DTXSID70212557
- InChI: InChI=1S/C16H12O5/c1-20-15-12(19)7-10(17)14-11(18)8-13(21-16(14)15)9-5-3-2-4-6-9/h2-8,17,19H,1H3 Key: XLTFNNCXVBYBSX-UHFFFAOYSA-N; InChI=1/C16H12O5/c1-20-15-12(19)7-10(17)14-11(18)8-13(21-16(14)15)9-5-3-2-4-6-9/h2-8,17,19H,1H3 Key: XLTFNNCXVBYBSX-UHFFFAOYAQ
- SMILES: COC1=C(C=C(C2=C1OC(=CC2=O)C3=CC=CC=C3)O)O

Properties
Chemical formula	C_{16}H_{12}O_{5}
Molar mass	284.267 g·mol^{−1}
Melting point	203 to 206 °C (397 to 403 °F; 476 to 479 K)
- Except where otherwise noted, data are given for materials in their standard state (at 25 °C [77 °F], 100 kPa). verify (what is ?) Infobox references

Wogonin is an O-methylated flavone, a flavonoid-like chemical compound which is found in Scutellaria baicalensis.

The glycosides of wogonin are known as wogonosides. For example, oroxindin is a wogonin glucuronide isolated from Oroxylum indicum. It is one of the active ingredients of Sho-Saiko-To, a Japanese herbal supplement.

== Pharmacology ==
Wogonin has been found in one study to have anxiolytic properties in mice at doses of 7.5 to 30 mg/kg, without exhibiting the sedative and muscle-relaxing properties of benzodiazepines. Preliminary in vitro studies have shown pharmacological effects that indicate wogonin may have anti-tumor properties. Wogonin has also been found to possess anticonvulsant effects. It acts as a positive allosteric modulator of the benzodiazepine site of the GABA_{A} receptor with a binding affinity of K_{i} 0.92 μM and an IC_{50} value of 1.26 μM which is about 100 times less potent than diazepam (IC_{50} value of 0.012 μM). The LD_{50} of pure Wogonin in mice is 3.9 g/kg of body weight suggesting low toxicity.

CNS review:

== See also ==
- Dihydrowogonin
