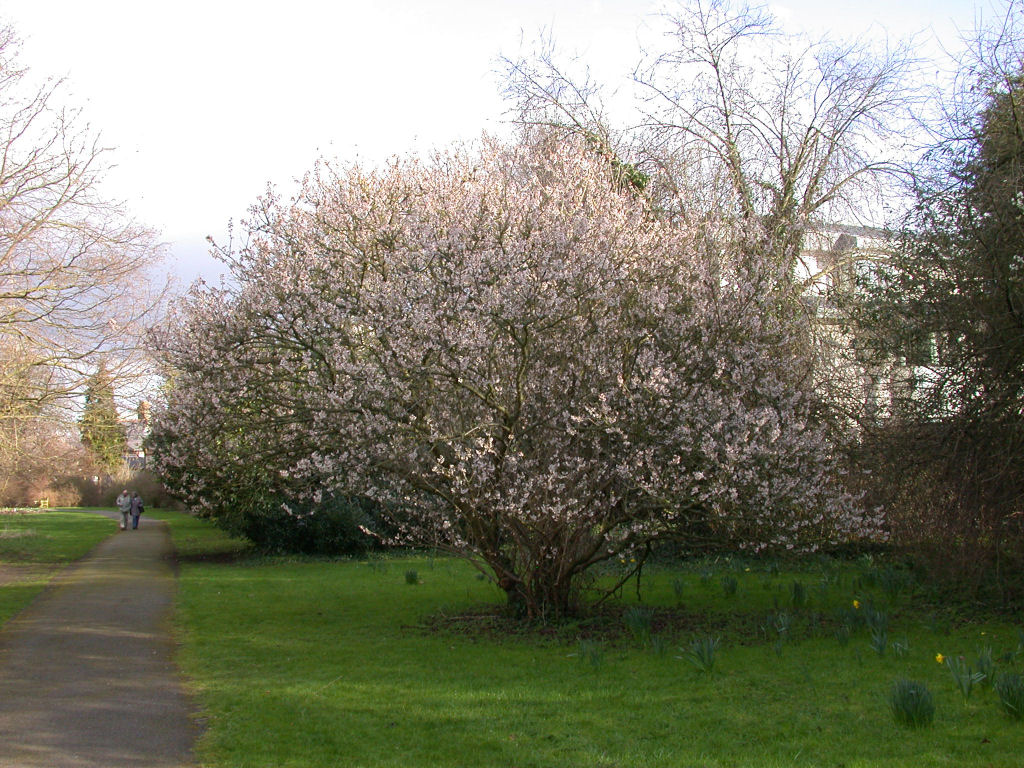
- Chinese sour cherry in bloom

Scientific classification
- Kingdom: Plantae
- Clade: Tracheophytes
- Clade: Angiosperms
- Clade: Eudicots
- Clade: Rosids
- Order: Rosales
- Family: Rosaceae
- Genus: Prunus
- Subgenus: Prunus subg. Cerasus
- Section: P. sect. Cerasus
- Species: P. pseudocerasus

Binomial name
- Prunus pseudocerasus Lindl.

Synonyms
- Cerasus pseudocerasus (Lindl.) Loudon; Padus pseudocerasus (Lindl.) S.Ya.Sokolov; Prunus ampla Koehne; Prunus involucrata Koehne; Prunus pauciflora Bunge; Prunus saltuum Koehne; Prunus scopulorum Koehne; Cerasus scopulorum (Koehne) T.T.Yu & C.L.Li; Prunus cantabrigiensis Stapf; Cerasus cantabrigiensis (Stapf) Ohle

= Prunus pseudocerasus =

Species of plant

Prunus pseudocerasus or Prunus pseudo-cerasus, the Chinese sour cherry or just Chinese cherry, is a species of cherry native to China. It is used worldwide as an ornamental for its early spring cherry blossoms. The fruit of some cultivars is edible.

== Description ==
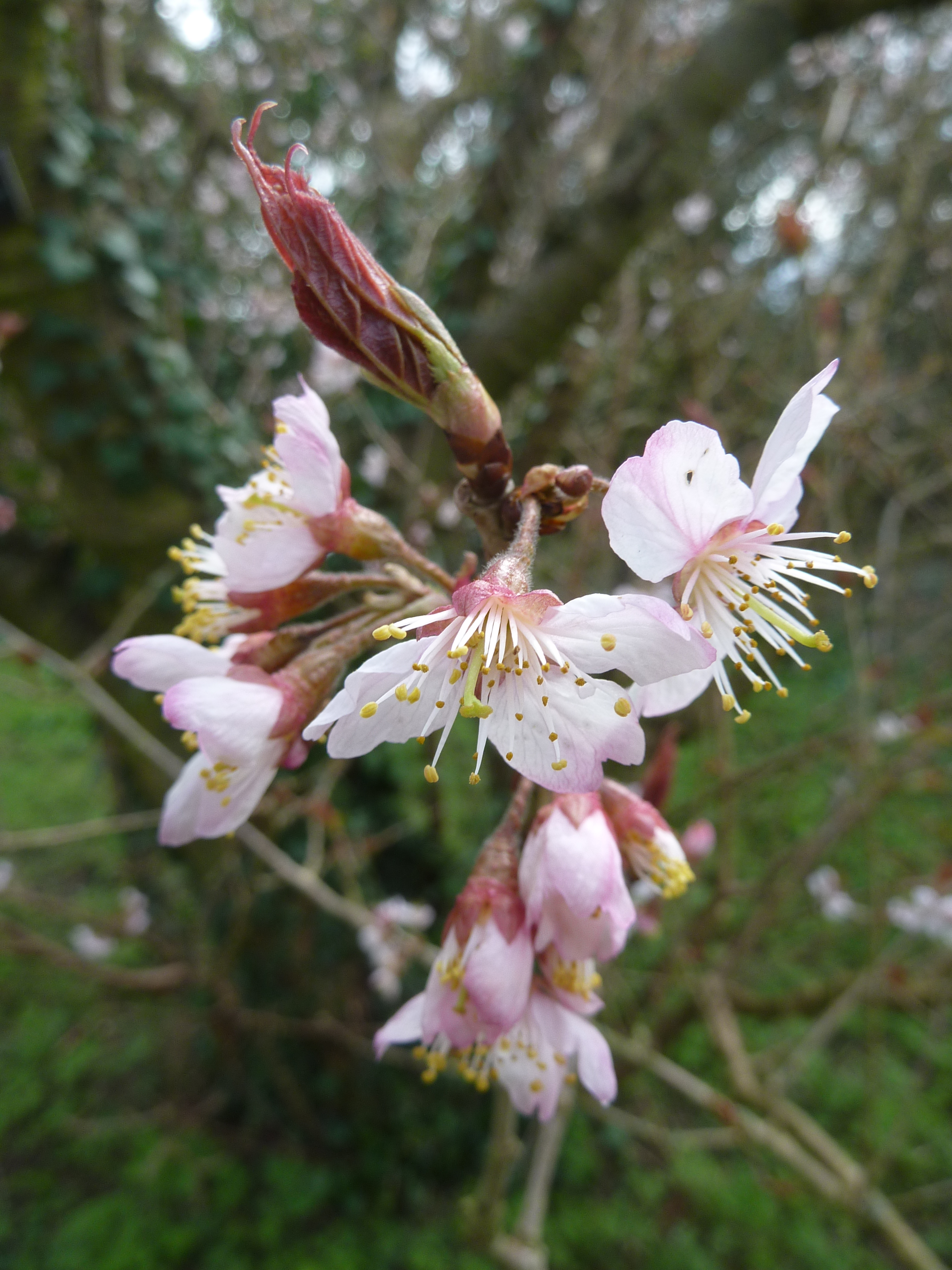
Prunus pseudocerasus var. cantabrigiensis flowers

A small bushy tree growing to at most 8 m (26 ft), it generally has reddish buds, shell pink 2 cm (0.8 in) flowers and typical red (if a bit pale) 1.5 cm (0.6 in) cherries. It can be distinguished from its congeners by certain traits; its 7–16 cm (3–6 in) leaves are broadly obovate, with an acuminate tip, flat and serrated, its inflorescences are corymbose or subumbellate, with at least three and as many as seven flowers, and its branches and peduncles are pubescent.

== Uses ==
In China it has been cultivated for its edible (if tart) fruit for around 2000 years. In Japan it is favored as an ornamental tree for its tendency to bloom, flowers before leaves, earlier than the Japanese cherry Prunus serrulata. A tetraploid with 2n=32 chromosomes, it is used as rootstock for other flowering cherries. It is the parent of a number of hybrid cultivars. It is resistant to the fungal disease cherry leaf spot. P. pseudocerasus is near extinction in the wild due to anthropogenic activities.
