= Prunus harae =

Conservation status
- Least Concern (IUCN 3.1)

Scientific classification
- Kingdom: Plantae
- Clade: Tracheophytes
- Clade: Angiosperms
- Clade: Eudicots
- Clade: Rosids
- Order: Rosales
- Family: Rosaceae
- Genus: Prunus
- Species: P. harae

Binomial name
- Prunus harae H.Ohba & S.Akiyama

Species of plant

Prunus harae is a species of flowering plant in the family Rosaceae, native to Bhutan. A small tree that is similar to Prunus rufa, the Himalayan cherry, it typically found growing at 2,500 to 3,200 m (8,200 to 10,500 ft) above sea level.
