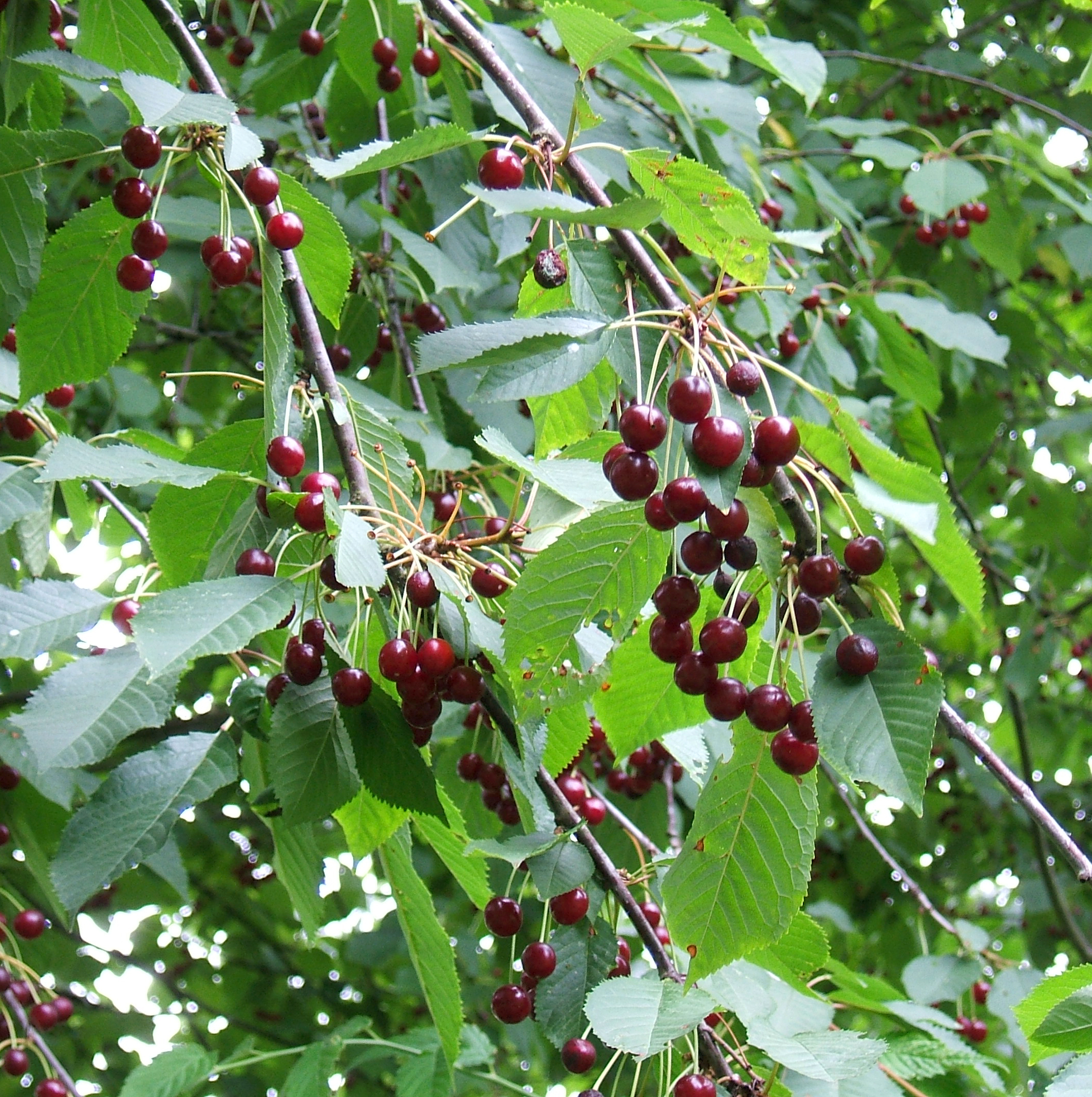

Conservation status
- Least Concern (IUCN 3.1)

Scientific classification
- Kingdom: Plantae
- Clade: Tracheophytes
- Clade: Angiosperms
- Clade: Eudicots
- Clade: Rosids
- Order: Rosales
- Family: Rosaceae
- Genus: Prunus
- Subgenus: Prunus subg. Cerasus
- Section: P. sect. Cerasus
- Species: P. avium

Binomial name
- Prunus avium L.
- Distribution map

Synonyms
- List: Prunus cerasus var. avium L.; Cerasus avium (L.) Moench; Druparia avium (L.) Clairv.; Prunus bigarella Dumort.; Prunus duracina (L.) Sweet; Prunus juliana (L.) Gaudin; Prunus nigricans Ehrh.; Prunus varia Ehrh.

= Prunus avium =

Species of flowering plant in the rose family

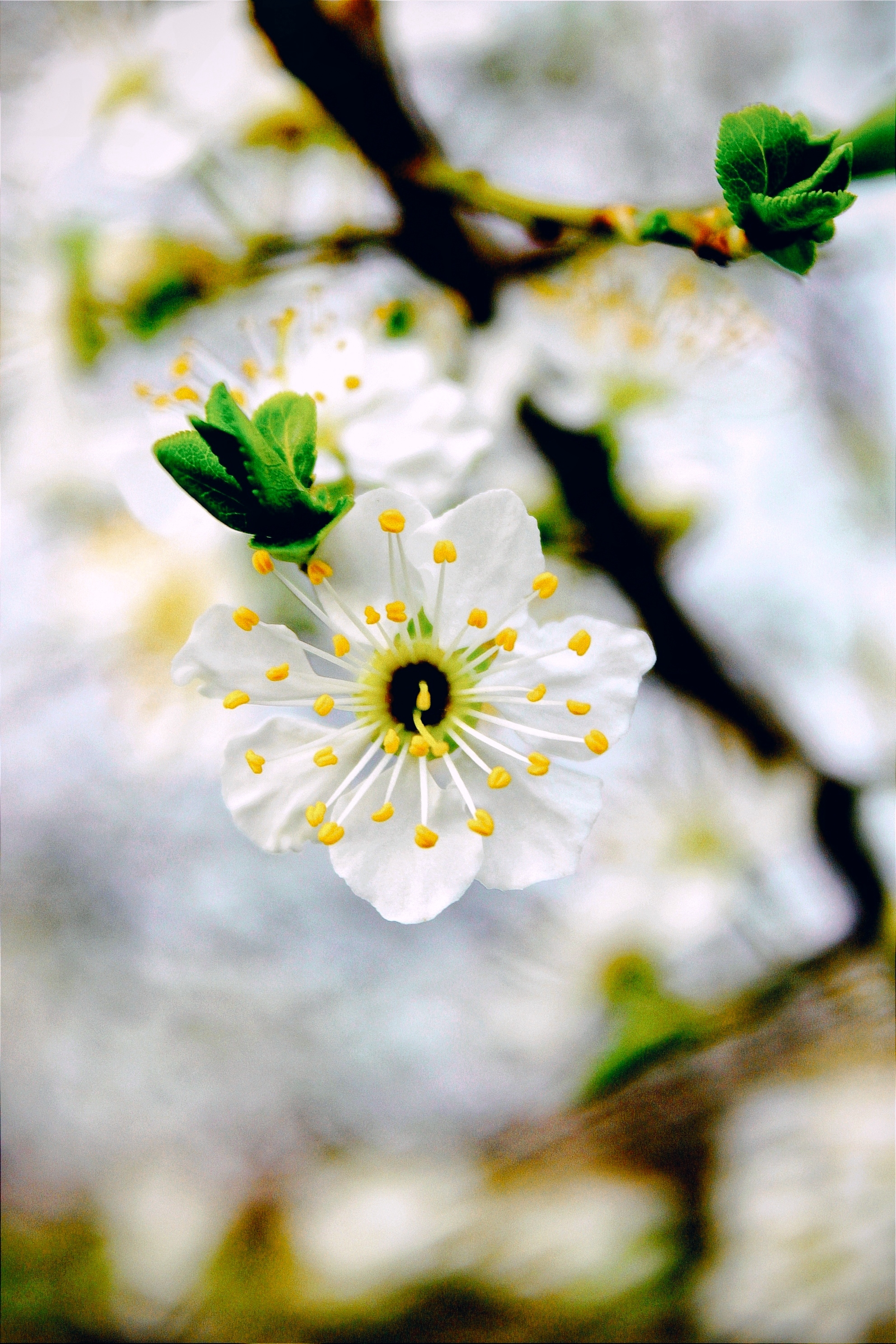
Prunus avium

Prunus avium, commonly called wild cherry, sweet cherry or gean, is a species of cherry, a flowering plant in the rose family, Rosaceae. It is native to western Eurasia and naturalized elsewhere. It is an ancestor of P. cerasus (sour cherry).

All parts of the plant except for the ripe fruit are slightly toxic, containing cyanogenic glycosides. The species is often cultivated as an ornamental tree.

== Description ==
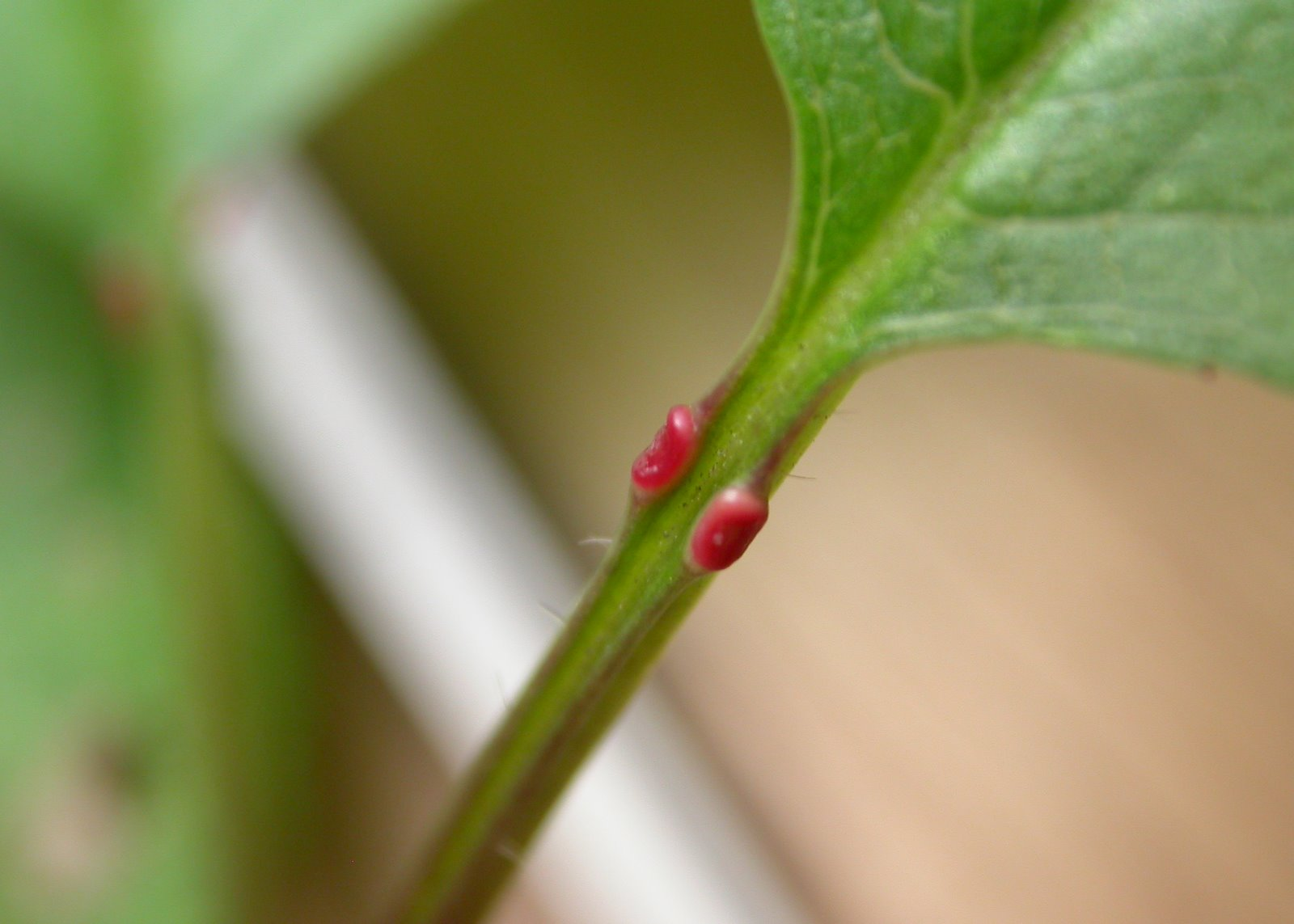
Red glands (extrafloral nectaries) on the petiole

Prunus avium is a deciduous tree growing to 5–25 metres (16–82 feet) tall, with a trunk up to 1.5 m (5 ft) in diameter. Young trees show strong apical dominance with a straight trunk and symmetrical conical crown, becoming rounded to irregular on old trees.

- The bark is smooth reddish-brown with prominent horizontal grey-brown lenticels on young trees, becoming thick dark blackish-brown and fissured on old trees.
- The leaves are alternate, simple ovoid-acute, 7–14 centimetres (2 3/4–5 1/2 inches) long and 4–7 cm (1 1/2–2 3/4 in) broad, glabrous matt or sub-shiny green above, variably finely downy beneath, with a serrated margin and an acuminate tip, with a green or reddish petiole 2–3.5 cm (3/4–1 1/2 in) long bearing two to five small red glands. The tip of each serrated edge of the leaves also bear small red glands. In autumn, the leaves turn orange, pink or red before falling.
- The flowers are produced in early spring at the same time as the new leaves, borne in corymbs of two to six together, each flower pendent on a 2–5 cm (3/4–2 in) peduncle, 2.5–3.5 cm (1–1 1/2 in) in diameter, with five pure white petals, yellowish stamens, and a superior ovary; they are hermaphroditic, and pollinated by bees. The ovary contains two ovules, only one of which becomes the seed.
- The fruit is a drupe 1–2.5 cm (1/2–1 in) in diameter (larger in some cultivated selections), bright red to dark purple when mature in midsummer, variably tasting sweet to somewhat astringent and bitter when fresh. Each fruit contains a single hard-shelled stone 8–12 millimetres (3/8–1/2 in) long, 7–10 mm wide and 6–8 mm thick, grooved along the flattest edge; the seed (kernel) inside the stone is 6–8 mm long. Fruits persist for an average of 3 days. Fruits average 81.8% water, and their dry weight includes 45.1% carbohydrates and 1.8% lipids.

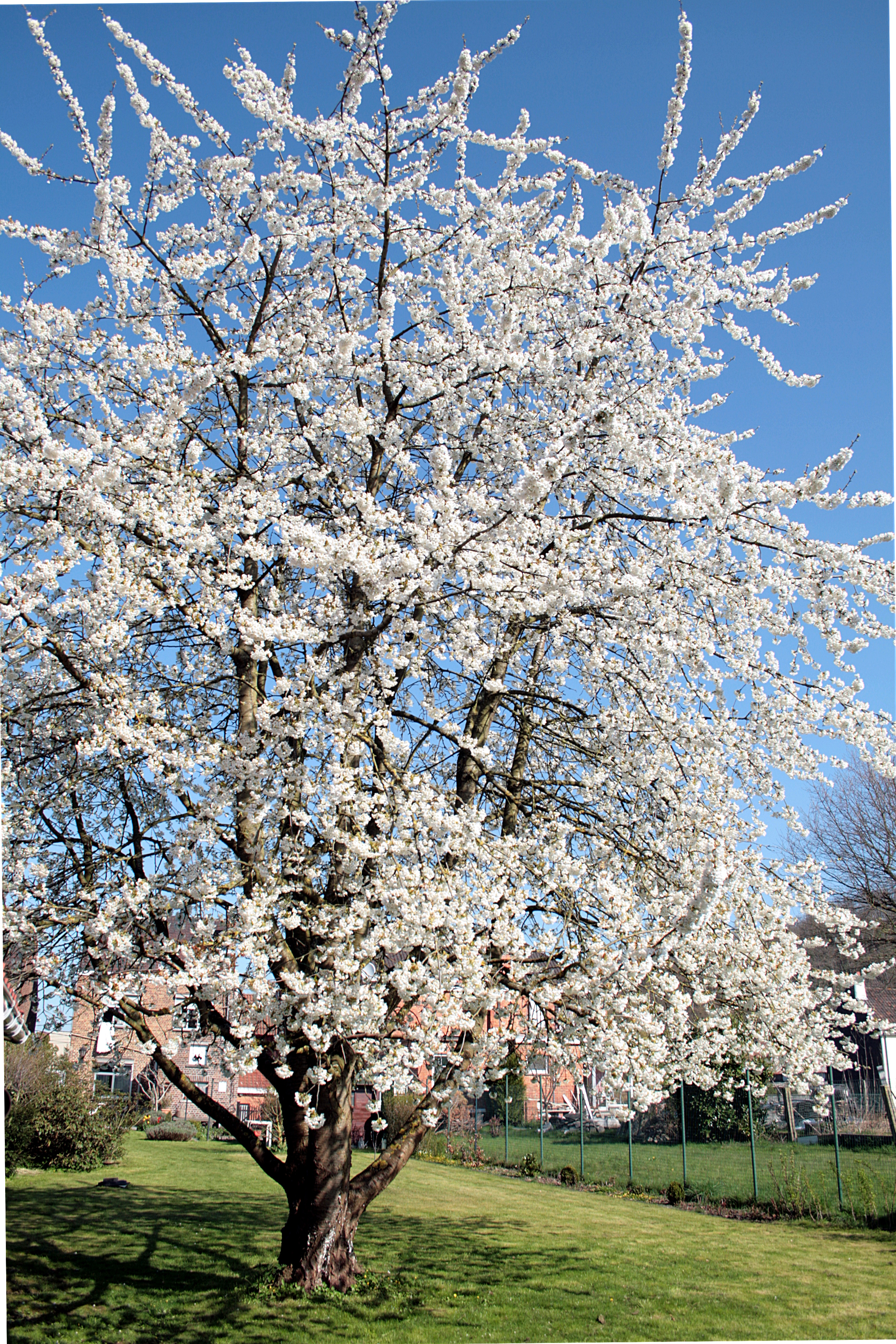
Prunus avium in spring

Prunus avium has a diploid set of sixteen chromosomes (2n = 16).

== Taxonomy ==
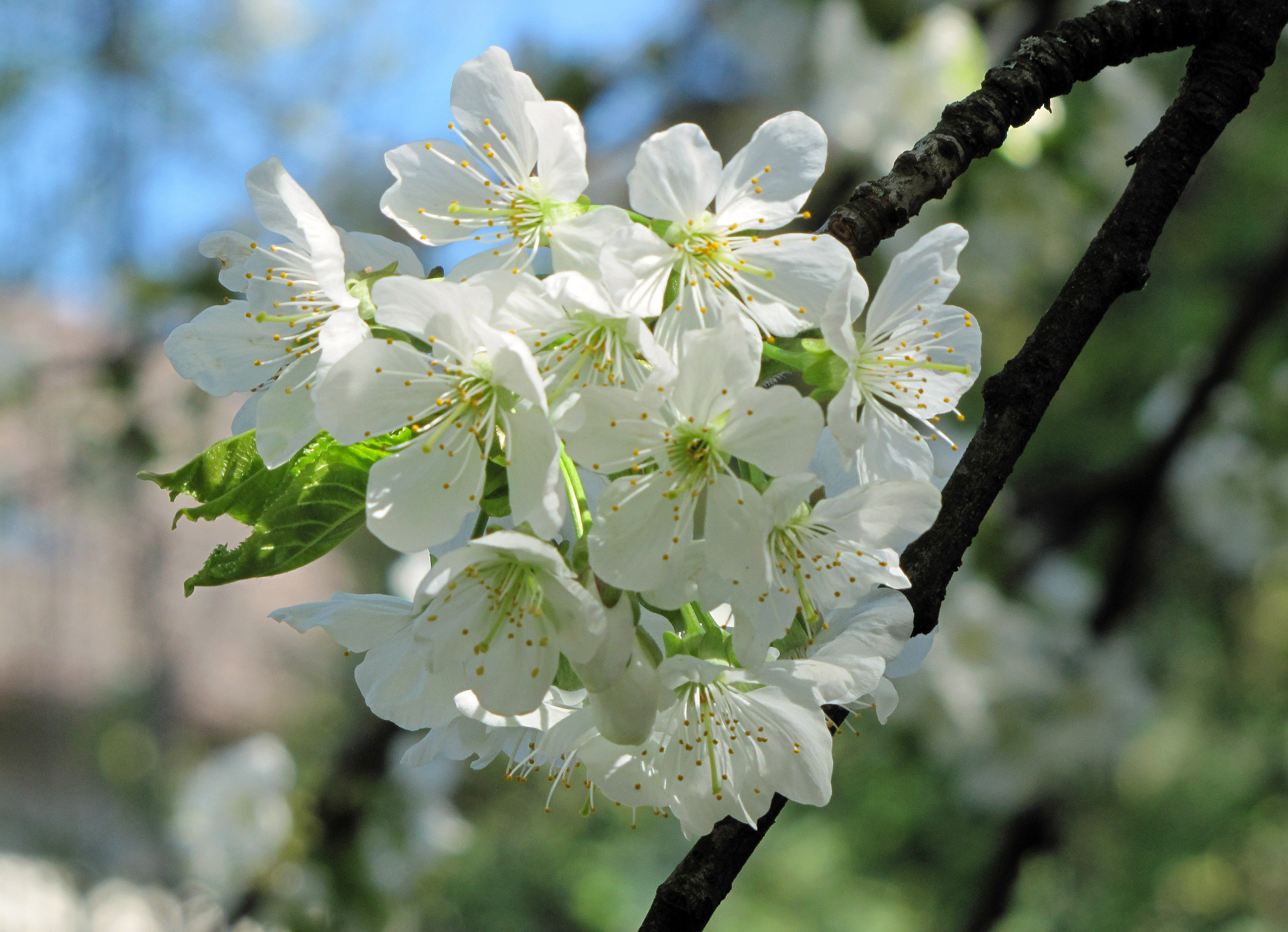
Blossom

The early history of its classification is somewhat confused. In the first edition of Species Plantarum (1753), Linnaeus treated it as only a variety, Prunus cerasus var. avium, citing Gaspard Bauhin's Pinax theatri botanici (1596).

His description, Cerasus racemosa hortensis ("cherry with racemes, of gardens") shows it was described from a cultivated plant. Linnaeus then changed from a variety to a species Prunus avium in the second edition of his Flora Suecica in 1755.

Sweet cherry was known historically as gean or mazzard (also 'massard'). Until recently, both were largely obsolete names in modern English.

The name "wild cherry" is also commonly applied to other species of Prunus growing in their native habitats, particularly to the North American species Prunus serotina.

Prunus avium means "bird cherry" in Latin, but in English "bird cherry" refers to Prunus padus.

=== Mazzard ===
'Mazzard' has been used to refer to a selected self-fertile cultivar that comes true from seed, and which is used as a seedling rootstock for fruiting cultivars. The term is used particularly for the varieties of P. avium grown in North Devon and cultivated there, particularly in the British orchards at Landkey.

== Distribution and habitat ==
Prunus avium is native to Europe, Anatolia, Maghreb, and Western Asia, from the British Isles south to Morocco and Tunisia, north to the Trondheimsfjord region in Norway and east to the Caucasus and northern Iran, with a small isolated population in the western Himalaya. The species is widely cultivated in other regions and has become naturalized in North America, New Zealand and Australia.

== Ecology ==
The fruit are readily eaten by multiple kinds of birds and mammals, which digest the fruit flesh and disperse the seeds in their droppings. Some rodents, and a few birds (notably the hawfinch), also crack open the stones to eat the kernel inside.

The leaves provide food for some animals, including Lepidoptera such as the case-bearer moth Coleophora anatipennella.

The tree exudes a gum from wounds in the bark, by which it seals the wounds to exclude insects and fungal infections.

Prunus avium is thought to be one of the parent species of Prunus cerasus (sour cherry), by way of ancient crosses between it and Prunus fruticosa (dwarf cherry) in the areas where the two species overlap. All three species can breed with one another. Prunus cerasus is now a species in its own right, having developed beyond a hybrid and stabilised.

== Cultivation ==
It is often cultivated as a flowering tree. Because of the size of the tree, it is often used in parkland, and less often as a street or garden tree. The double-flowered form, 'Plena', is commonly found, rather than the wild single-flowered forms. In the UK, P. avium 'Plena' has gained the Royal Horticultural Society's Award of Garden Merit.

Two interspecific hybrids, P. × schmittii (P. avium × P. canescens) and P. × fontenesiana (P. avium × P. mahaleb) are also grown as ornamental trees.

== Toxicity ==
All parts of the plant except for the ripe fruit are slightly toxic, containing cyanogenic glycosides.

== Uses ==
=== Fruit ===
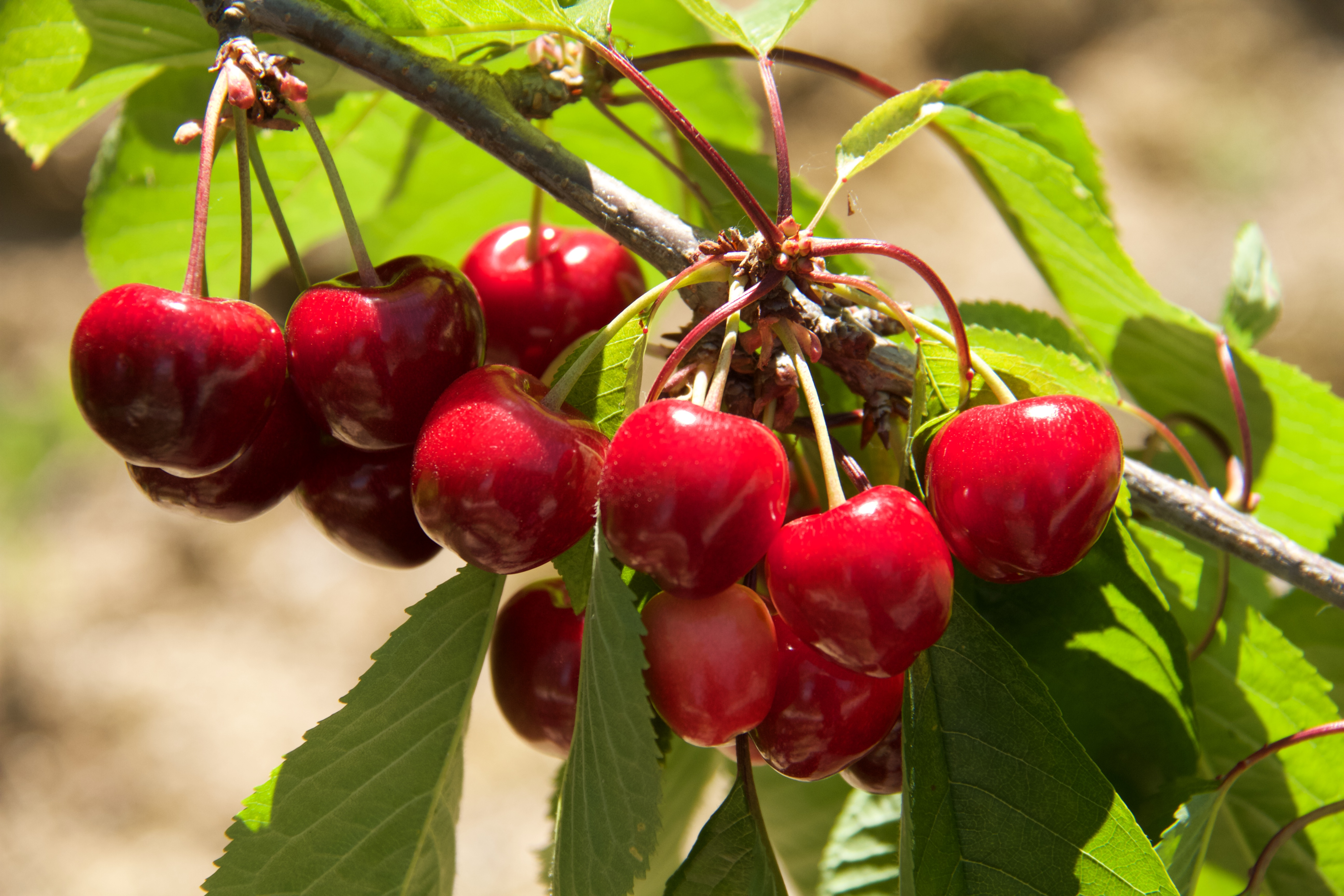
Pairs of fruit growing from the same stem

Wild cherries have been an item of human food for several thousands of years. The stones have been found in deposits at Bronze Age settlements throughout Europe, including in Britain. In one dated example, wild cherry macrofossils were found in a core sample from the detritus beneath a dwelling at an Early and Middle Bronze Age pile-dwelling site on and in the shore of a former lake at Desenzano del Garda or Lonato, near the southern shore of Lake Garda, Italy. The date is estimated at Early Bronze Age IA, carbon dated there to 2077 BCE plus or minus 10 years. The natural forest was largely cleared at that time.

By 800 BCE, cherries were being actively cultivated in Asia Minor, and soon after in Greece.

As the main ancestor of the cultivated cherry, the sweet cherry is one of the two cherry species which supply most of the world's commercial cultivars of edible cherry (the other is the sour cherry Prunus cerasus, mainly used for cooking; a few other species have had a very small input).

Various cherry cultivars are now grown worldwide wherever the climate is suitable; the number of cultivars is now very large. The species has also escaped from cultivation and become naturalised in some temperate regions, including southwestern Canada, Japan, New Zealand, and the northeast and northwest of the United States.

=== Timber ===
The hard, reddish-brown wood (cherry wood) is valued as a hardwood for woodturning, and making cabinets and musical instruments. Cherry wood is also used for smoking foods, particularly meats, in North America, as it lends a distinct and pleasant flavor to the product.

=== Other uses ===
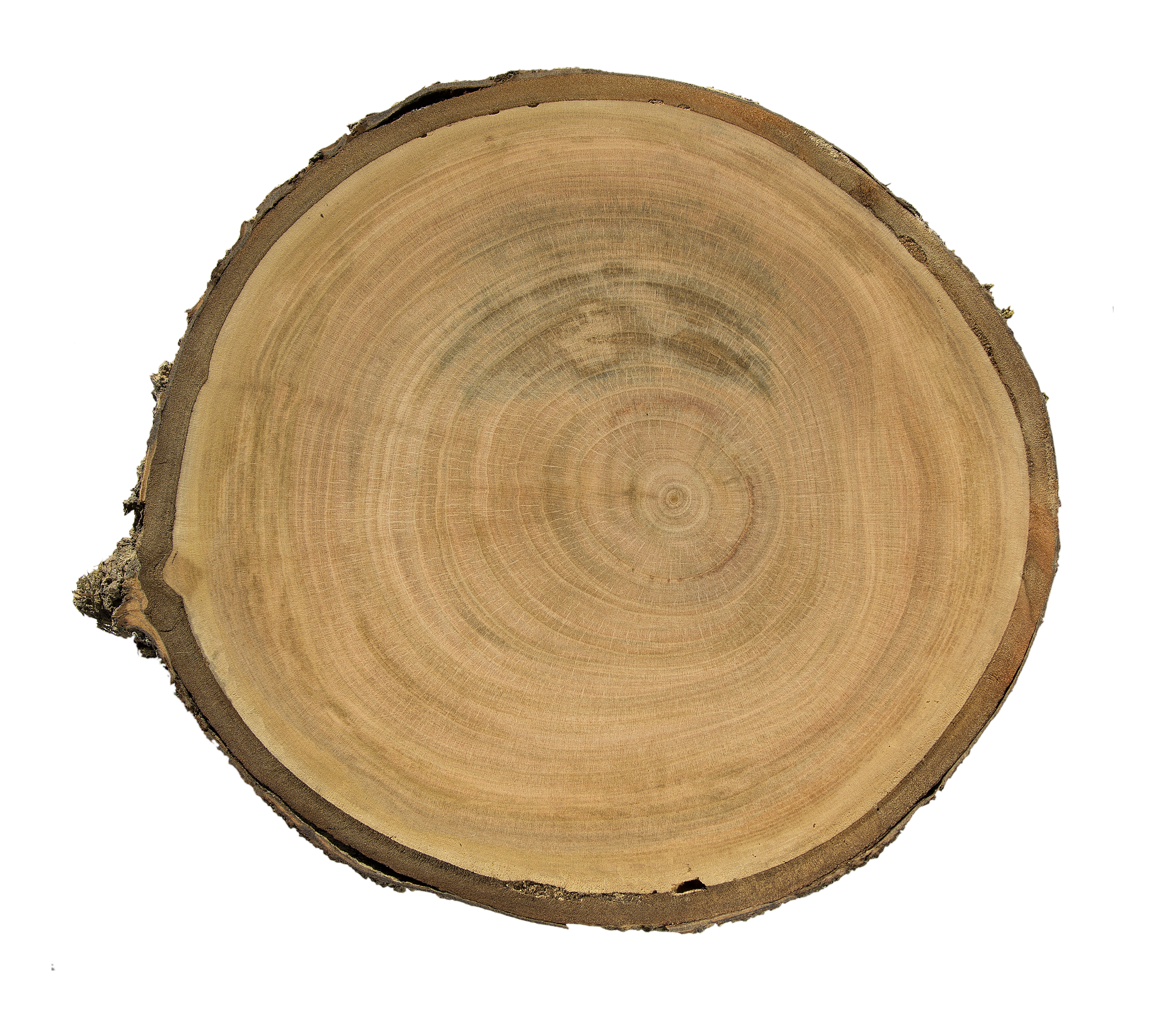
Prunus avium burlat - MHNT

The gum from bark wounds is aromatic and can be chewed as a substitute for chewing gum. Medicine can be prepared from the stalks (peduncles) of the drupes that is astringent, antitussive, and diuretic.

A green dye can also be prepared from the plant.

Wild cherry is used extensively in Europe for the afforestation of agricultural land and it is also valued for wildlife and amenity plantings. Multiple European countries have gene conservation and/or breeding programmes for wild cherry.

Dihydrowogonin has been identified as a major constituent in the methanol extract of wild cherry bark.

== Cultural history ==
Pliny distinguishes between Prunus, the plum fruit, and Cerasus, the cherry fruit. Already in Pliny quite a number of cultivars are cited, some possibly species or varieties, Aproniana, Lutatia, Caeciliana, and so on. Pliny grades them by flavour, including dulcis ("sweet") and acer ("sharp"), and goes so far as to incorrectly say that before the Roman consul Lucius Licinius Lucullus defeated Mithridates in 74 BCE, Cerasia ... non-fuere in Italia, "There were no cherry trees in Italy". According to him, Lucullus brought them in from Pontus and in the 120 years since that time they had spread across Europe to Britain. Some 18th- and 19th-century botanical authors assumed a western Asian origin for the species based on Pliny's writings, but this was contradicted by archaeological finds of seeds from prehistoric Europe.

Although cultivated/domesticated varieties of P. avium did not exist in Britain or much of Europe, the tree in its wild state is native to most of Europe, including Britain. Evidence of consumption of the wild fruits has been found as far back as the Bronze Age at a Crannog in County Offaly, in Ireland.

Seeds of a number of cherry species have however been found in Bronze Age and Roman archaeological sites throughout Europe. The reference to "sweet" and "sour" supports the modern view that "sweet" was P. avium; there are no other candidates among the cherries found. In 1882 Alphonse de Candolle pointed out that seeds of P. avium were found in the Terramare culture of north Italy (1500–1100 BCE) and over the layers of the Swiss pile dwellings. Of Pliny's statement he says (p. 210):

Since this error is perpetuated by its incessant repetition in classical schools, it must once more be said that cherry trees (at least the bird cherry) existed in Italy before Lucullus, and that the famous gourmet did not need to go far to seek the species with the sour or bitter fruit.

De Candolle suggests that what Lucullus brought back was a particular cultivar of P. avium from the Caucasus. The origin of cultivars of P. avium is still an open question. Modern cultivated cherries differ from wild ones in having larger fruit, 2–3 cm diameter. The trees are often grown on dwarfing rootstocks to keep them smaller for easier harvesting.

Folkard (1892) similarly identifies Lucullus's cherry as a cultivated variety. He states that it was planted in Britain a century after its introduction into Italy, but "disappeared during the Saxon period". He notes that in the fifteenth century "Cherries on the ryse" (i.e. on the twigs) was one of the street cries of London, but conjectures that these were the fruit of "the native wild Cherry, or Gean-tree". The cultivated variety was reintroduced into Britain by the fruiterer of Henry VIII, who brought it from Flanders and planted a cherry orchard at Teynham.

== See also ==
- List of Award of Garden Merit flowering cherries

== Bibliography ==
- Ehrlén, Johan; Eriksson, Ove (1991). "Phenological variation in fruit characteristics in vertebrate-dispersed plants". Oecologia. 86 (4): 463–470. Bibcode:1991Oecol..86..463E. doi:10.1007/BF00318311. ISSN 0029-8549.
