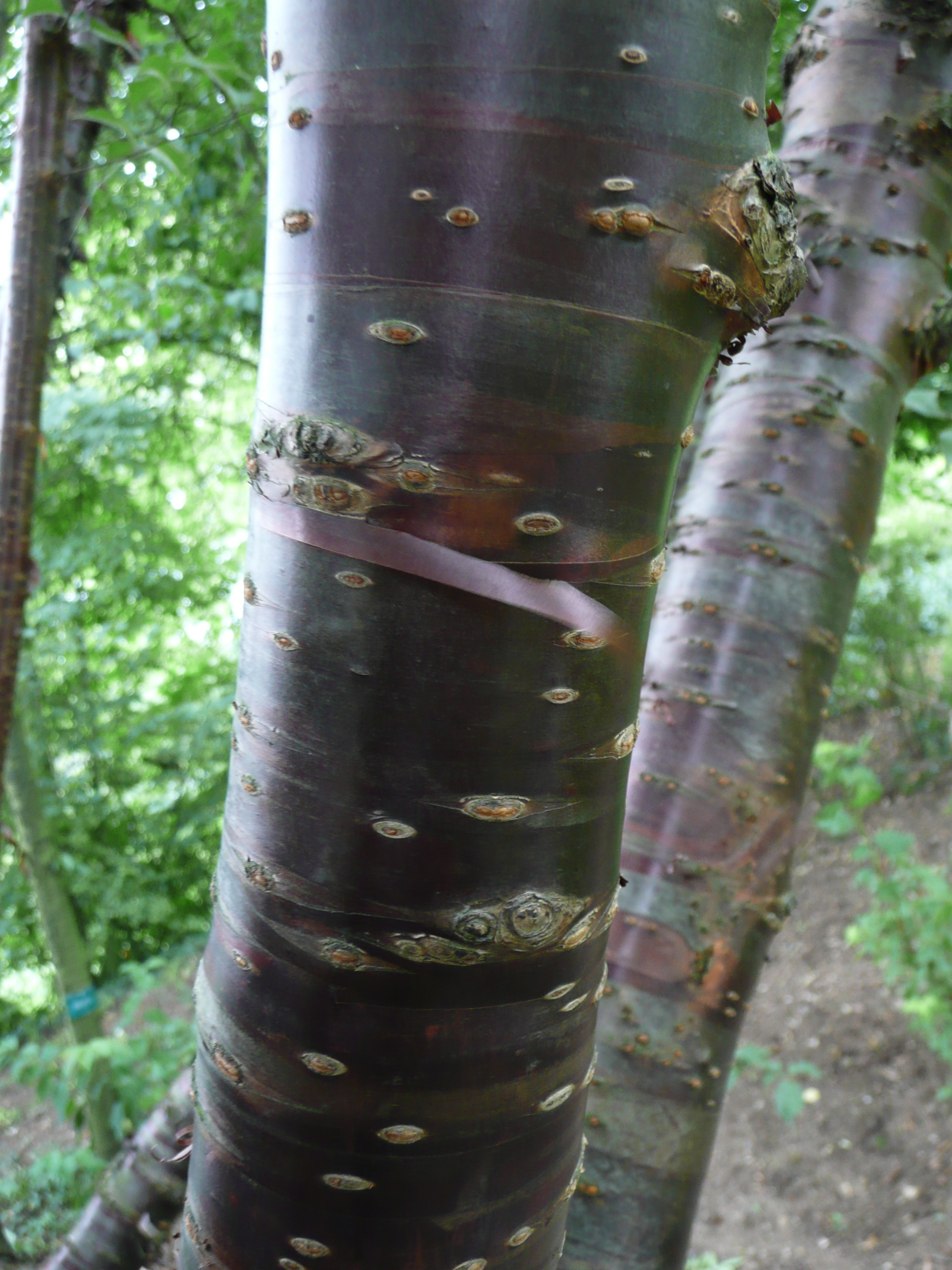
- Closeup of the bark

Conservation status
- Data Deficient (IUCN 3.1)

Scientific classification
- Kingdom: Plantae
- Clade: Tracheophytes
- Clade: Angiosperms
- Clade: Eudicots
- Clade: Rosids
- Order: Rosales
- Family: Rosaceae
- Genus: Prunus
- Section: P. sect. Cerasus
- Species: P. canescens

Binomial name
- Prunus canescens Bois

Synonyms
- Cerasus canescens (Bois) S.Ya.Sokolov

= Prunus canescens =

Species of tree

Prunus canescens, the gray-leaf cherry (and hoary cherry, although that name is also used for Prunus incana), is a species of cherry native to China, found in Hubei and Sichuan provinces. A shrubby tree, it grows to about 3 m. It is a parent of a number of hybrid rootstocks for sweet cherries, and occasionally grown as an ornamental for its attractive shiny brown bark.

== Hybrids ==
Hybrids having P. canescens as a parent include Prunus × schmittii (P. avium × P. canescens), an ornamental tree, and the important GiSeLa dwarfing rootstock series (P. cerasus × P. canescens).
