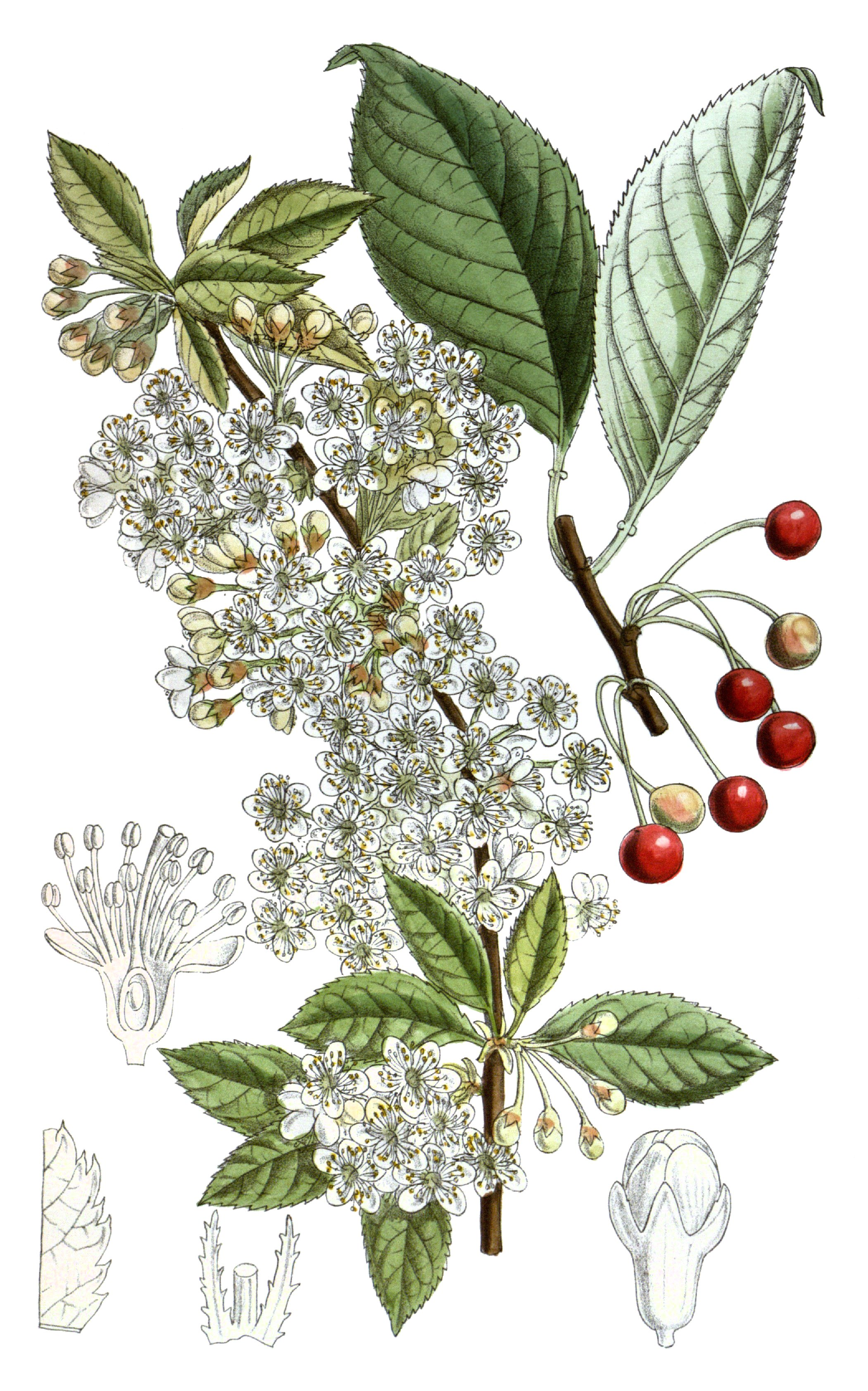
- 1913 illustration

Conservation status
- Least Concern (IUCN 3.1)

Scientific classification
- Kingdom: Plantae
- Clade: Tracheophytes
- Clade: Angiosperms
- Clade: Eudicots
- Clade: Rosids
- Order: Rosales
- Family: Rosaceae
- Genus: Prunus
- Subgenus: Prunus subg. Cerasus
- Section: P. sect. Cerasus
- Species: P. pensylvanica

Binomial name
- Prunus pensylvanica L.f.
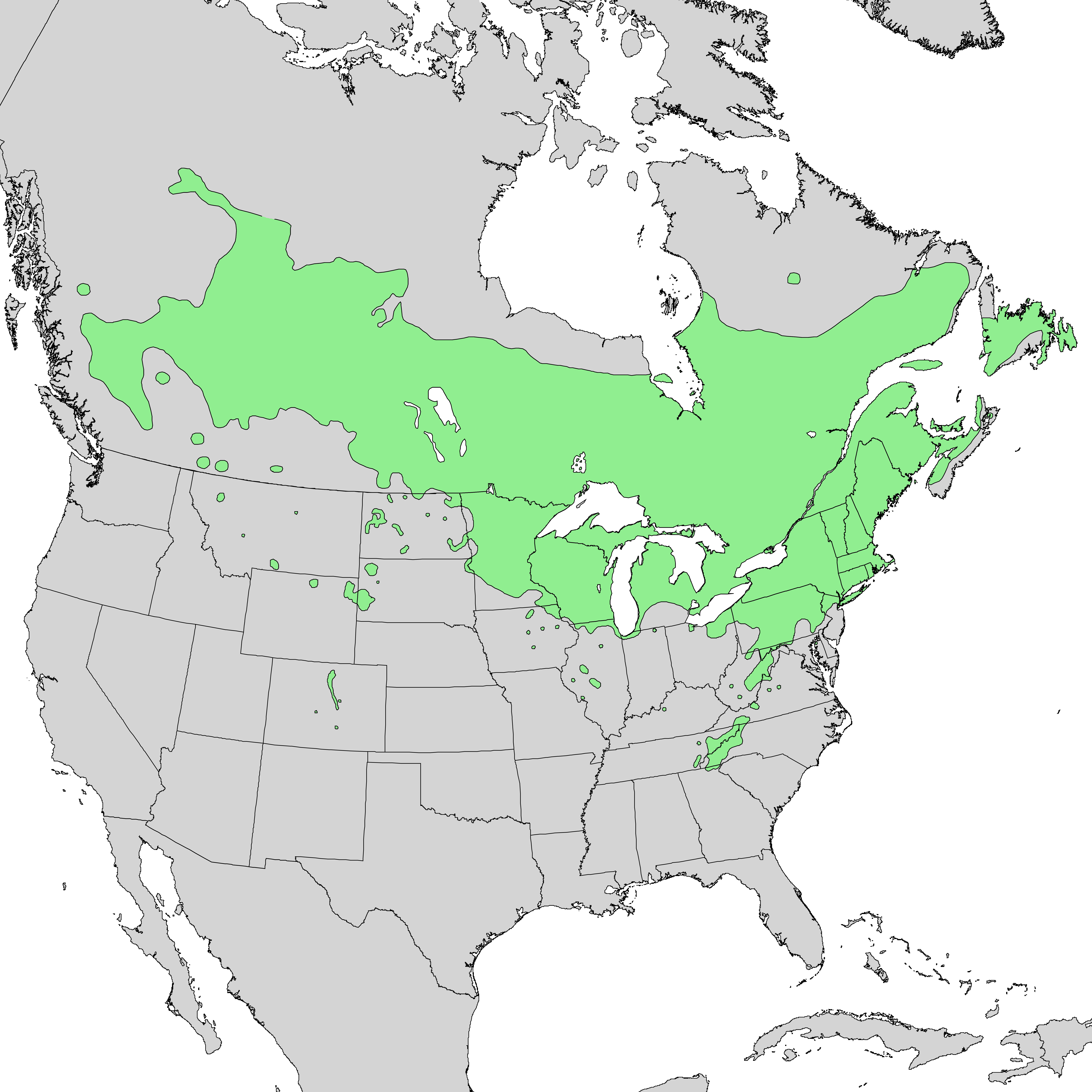
- Natural range

Synonyms
- Cerasus pensylvanica (L.f.) Loisel.; Padellus pensylvanica (L.f.) Eremin & Yushev; Padus pensylvanica (L.f.) S.Ya.Sokolov; Prunus cerasifolia S.Watson; Prunus pennsylvanica Sarg.; Prunus borealis (Michx.) Poir.; Prunus lanceolata Willd.; Prunus persicifolia Desf.; Prunus corymbulosa Rydb.; Prunus trichopetala Blankinship

= Prunus pensylvanica =

Species of tree

Prunus pensylvanica, also known as bird cherry, fire cherry, pin cherry, and red cherry, is a North American cherry species in the genus Prunus. The fruit is edible and can be used in canning.

== Description ==
Prunus pensylvanica grows as a shrub or small tree, usually with a straight trunk and a narrow, round-topped crown. It grows 5–15 metres (16–49 feet) tall and 10–51 centimetres (4–20 inches) in diameter. Trees up to 30 m (98 ft) tall have been found growing in the southern Appalachians, with the largest found on the western slopes of the Great Smoky Mountains. Its foliage is thin, with leaves 4–11 cm (1 1/2–4 1/4 in) long and 1–4.5 cm (3/8–1 3/4 in) wide.

Flowers occur in small groupings of five to seven with individual flowers 1 cm (1/2 in) across. The fruit are drupes, ranging from 4–8 millimetres (1/8–3/8 in), each with a single seed 4–6 mm (3/16–1/4 in) in diameter contained within a hard pit.

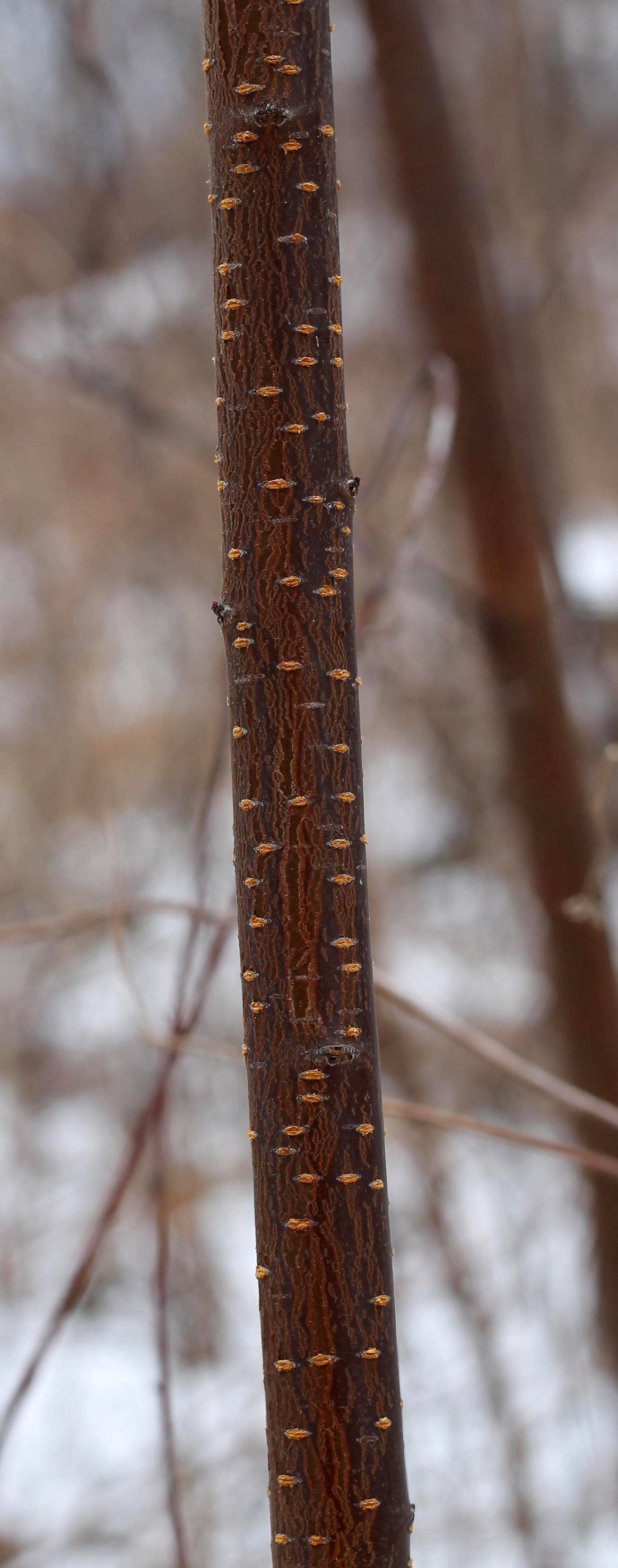
Young trunk

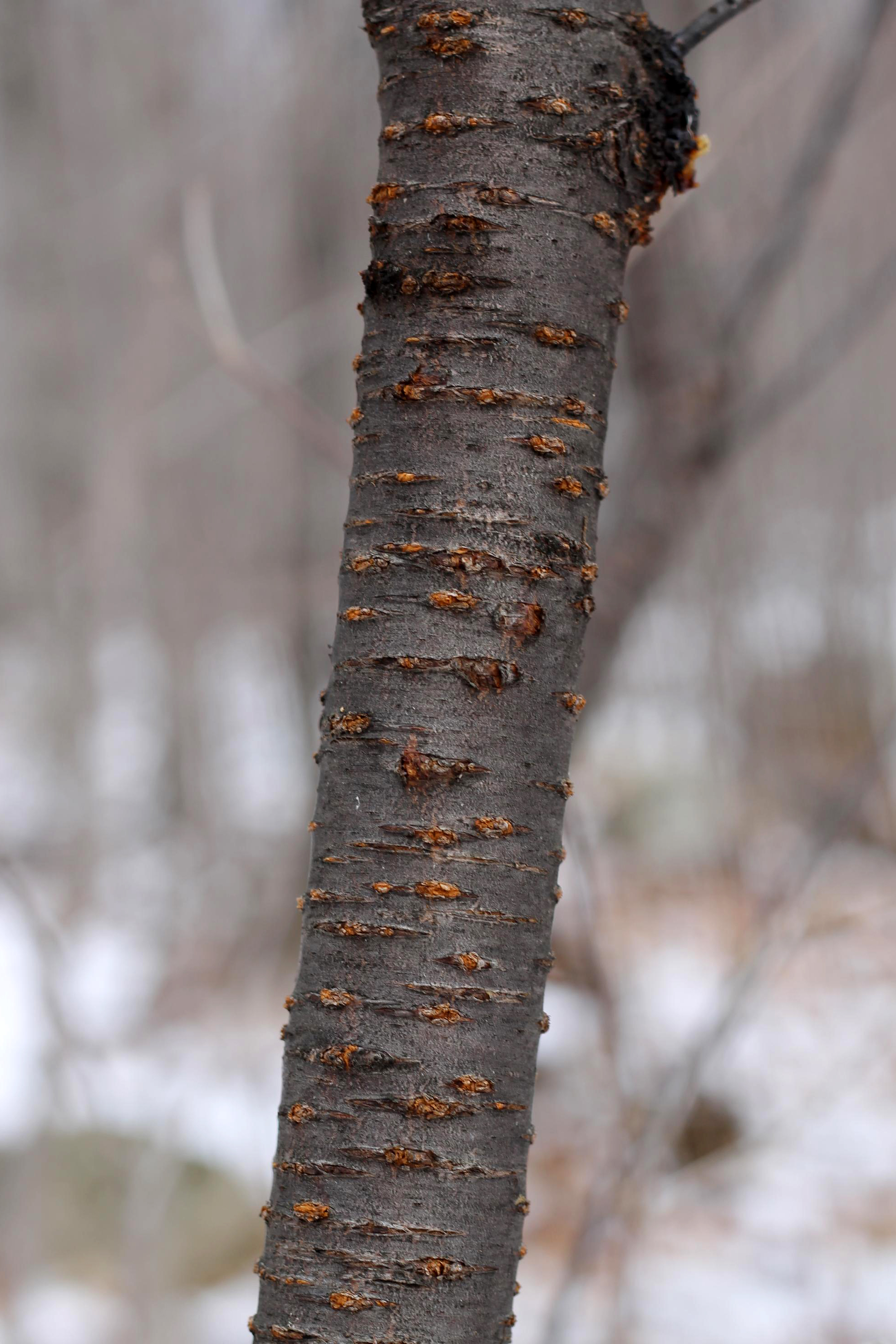
Mature trunk

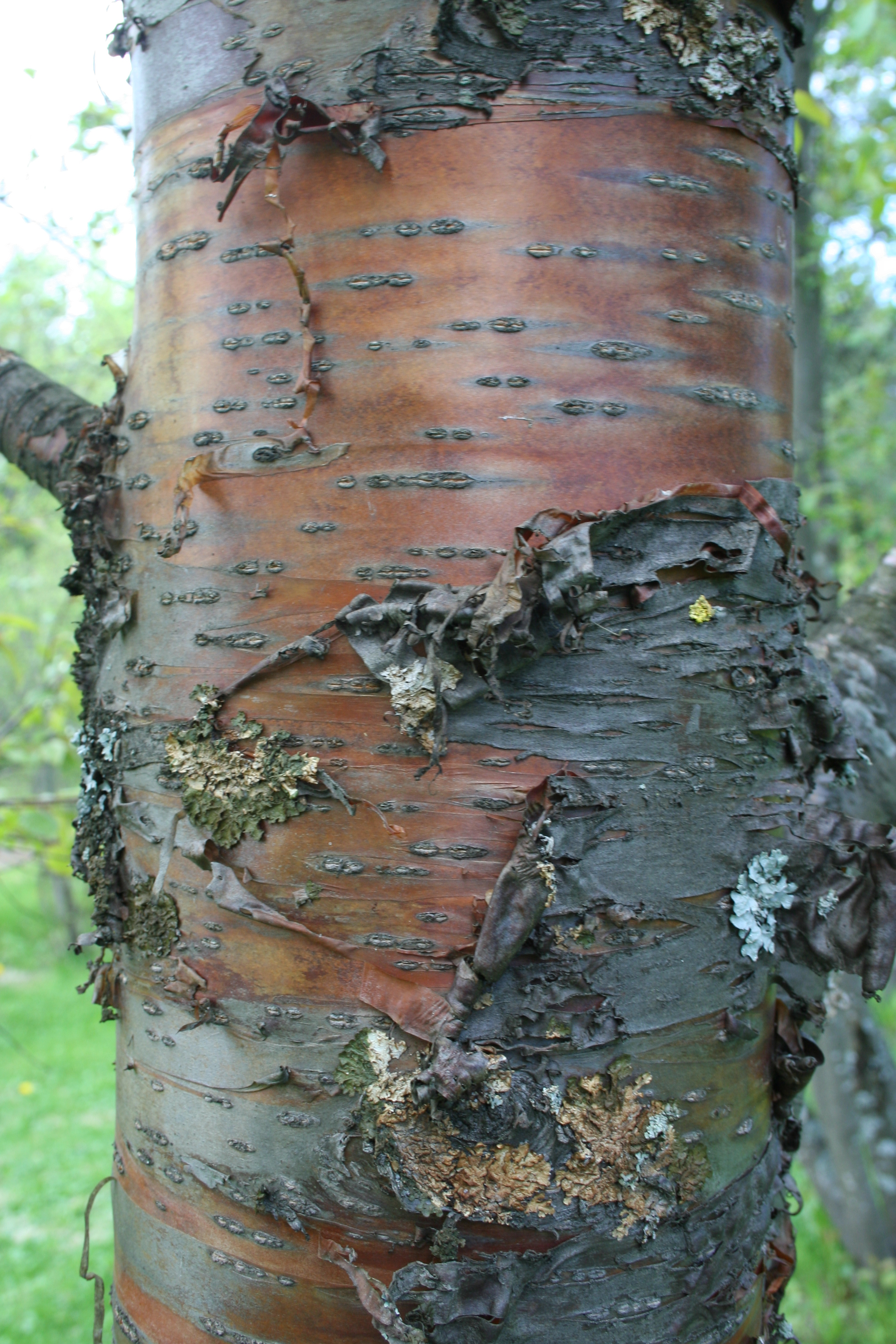
Trunk with peeling bark

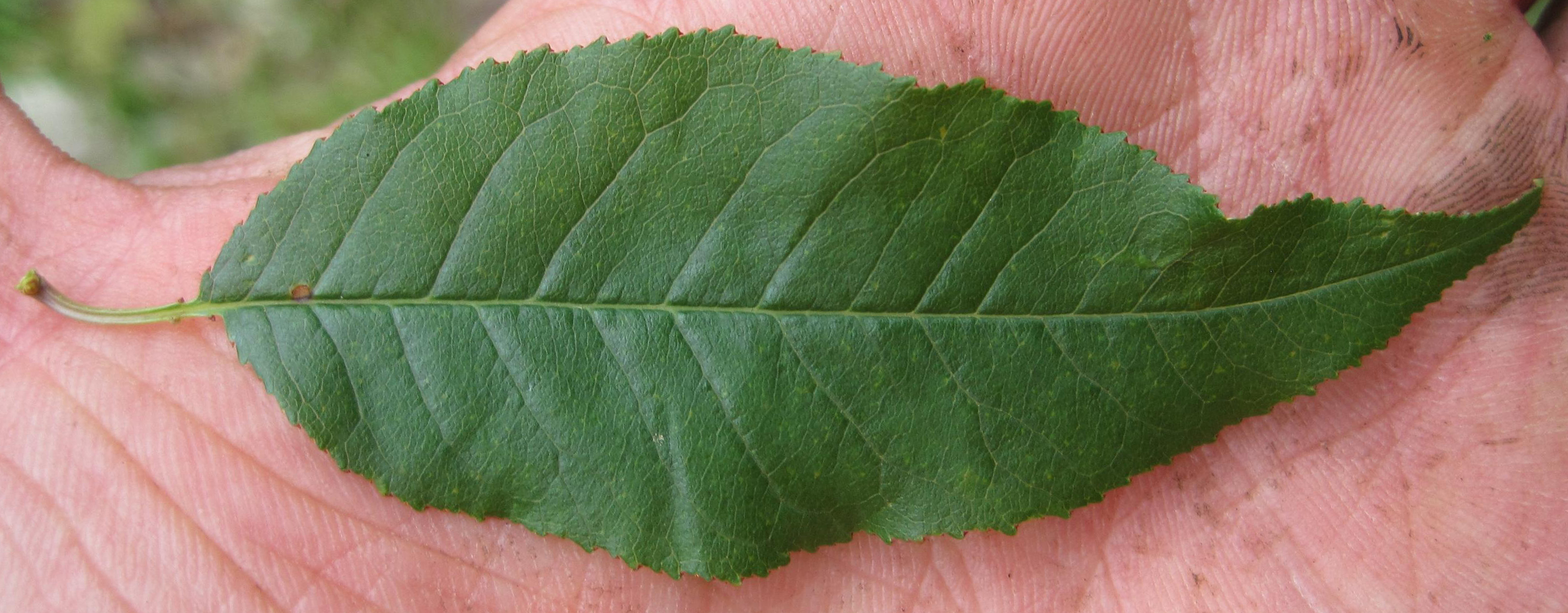
Leaf close-up

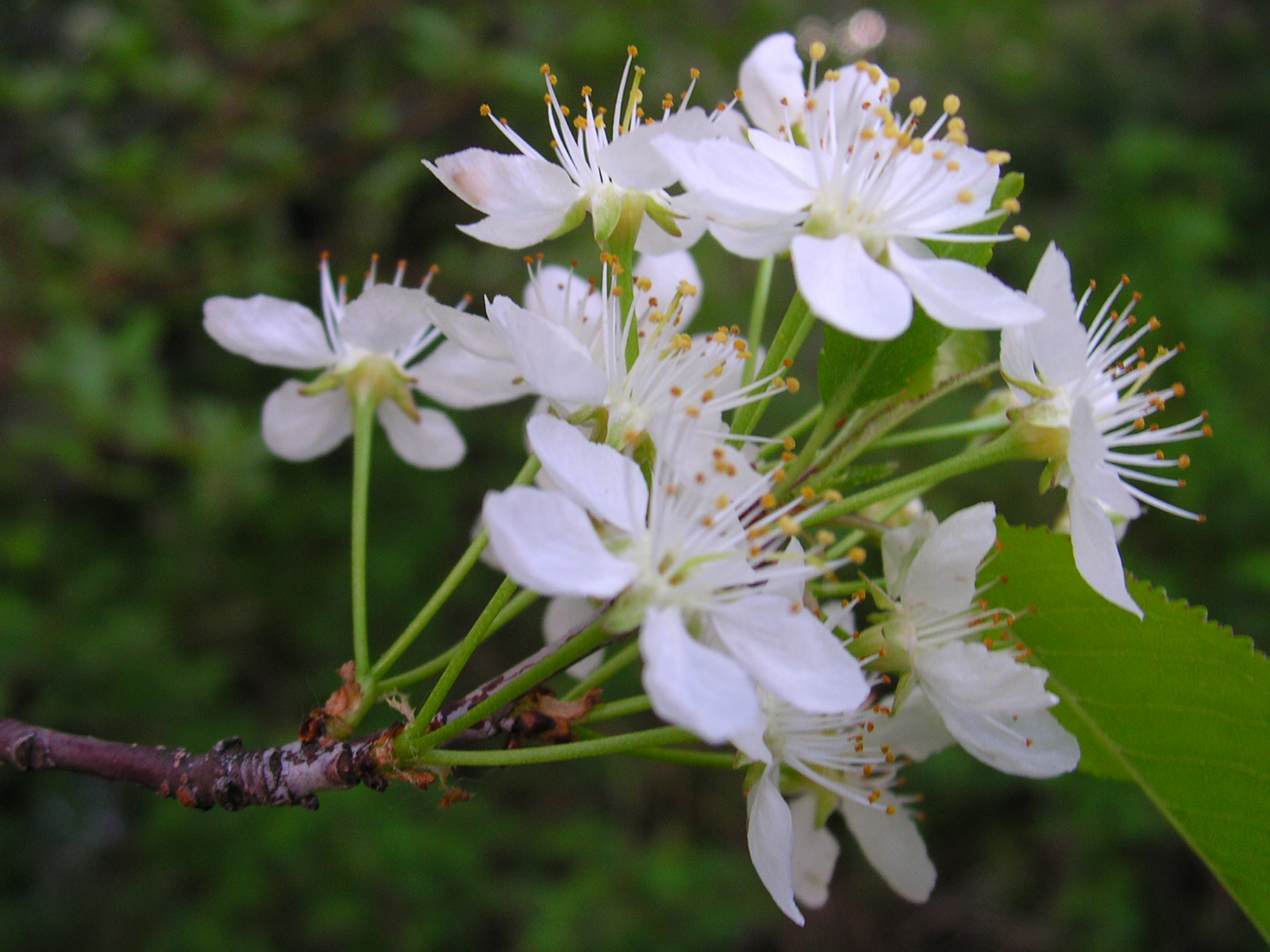
Blossom

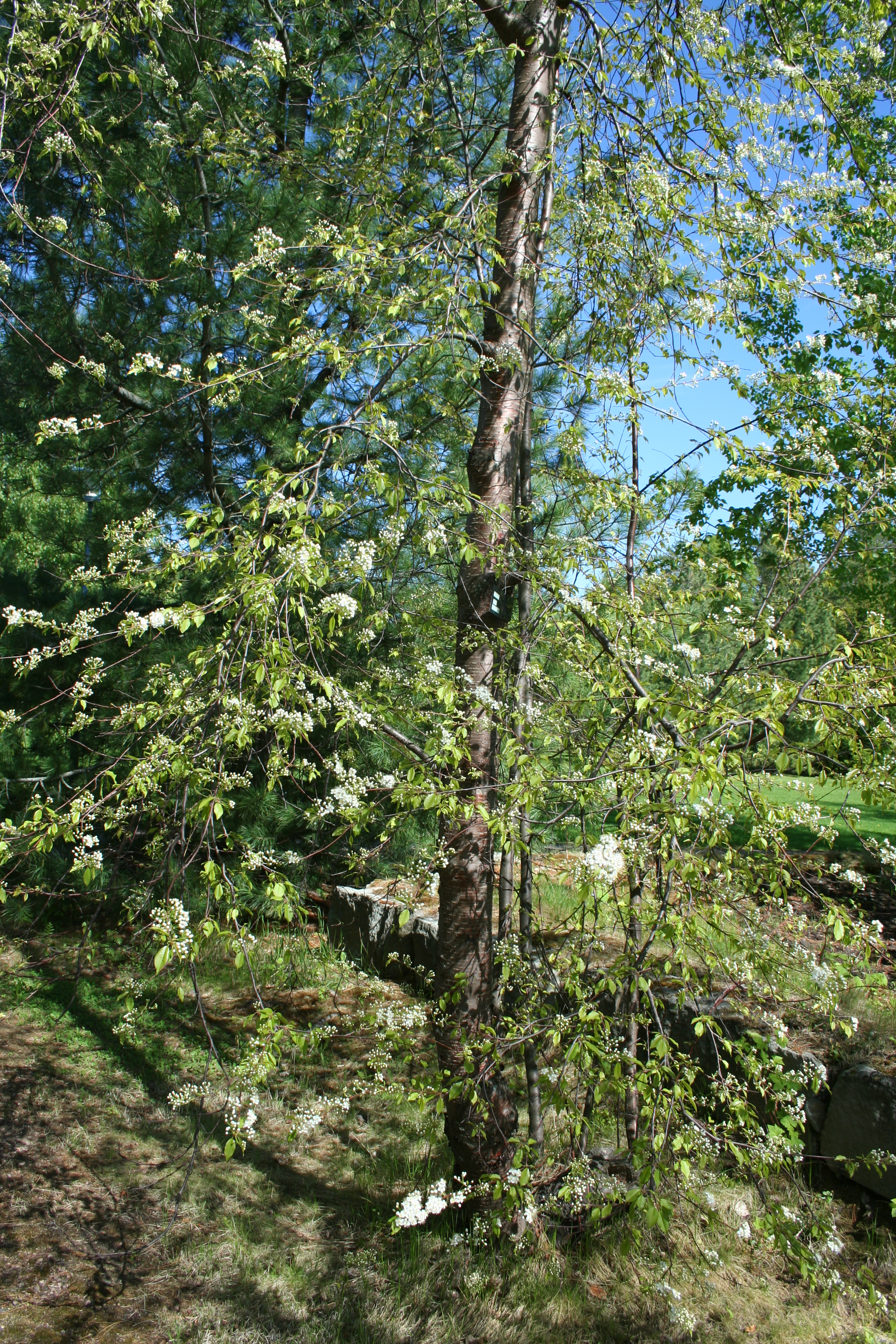
Tree in early summer

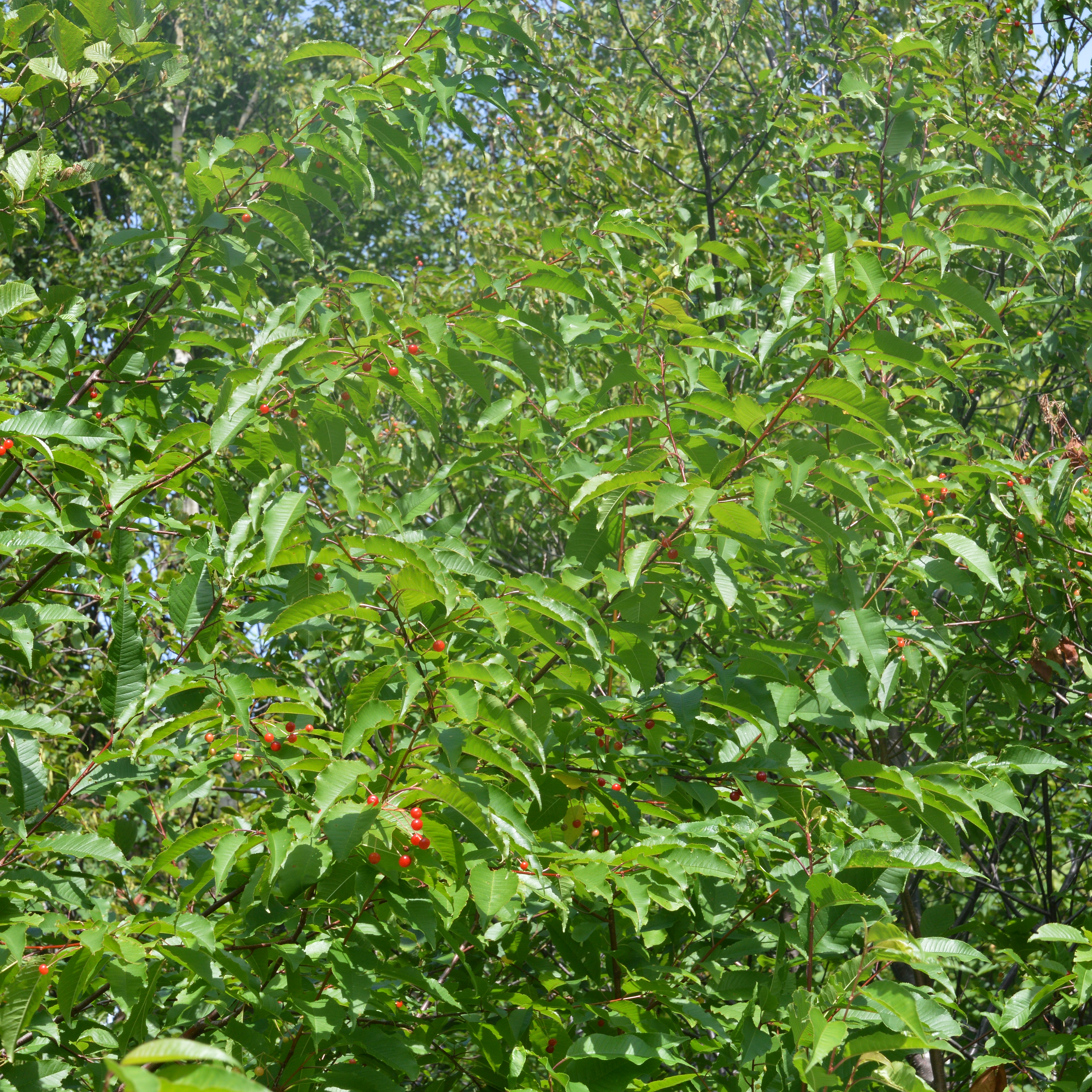
Specimen in summer

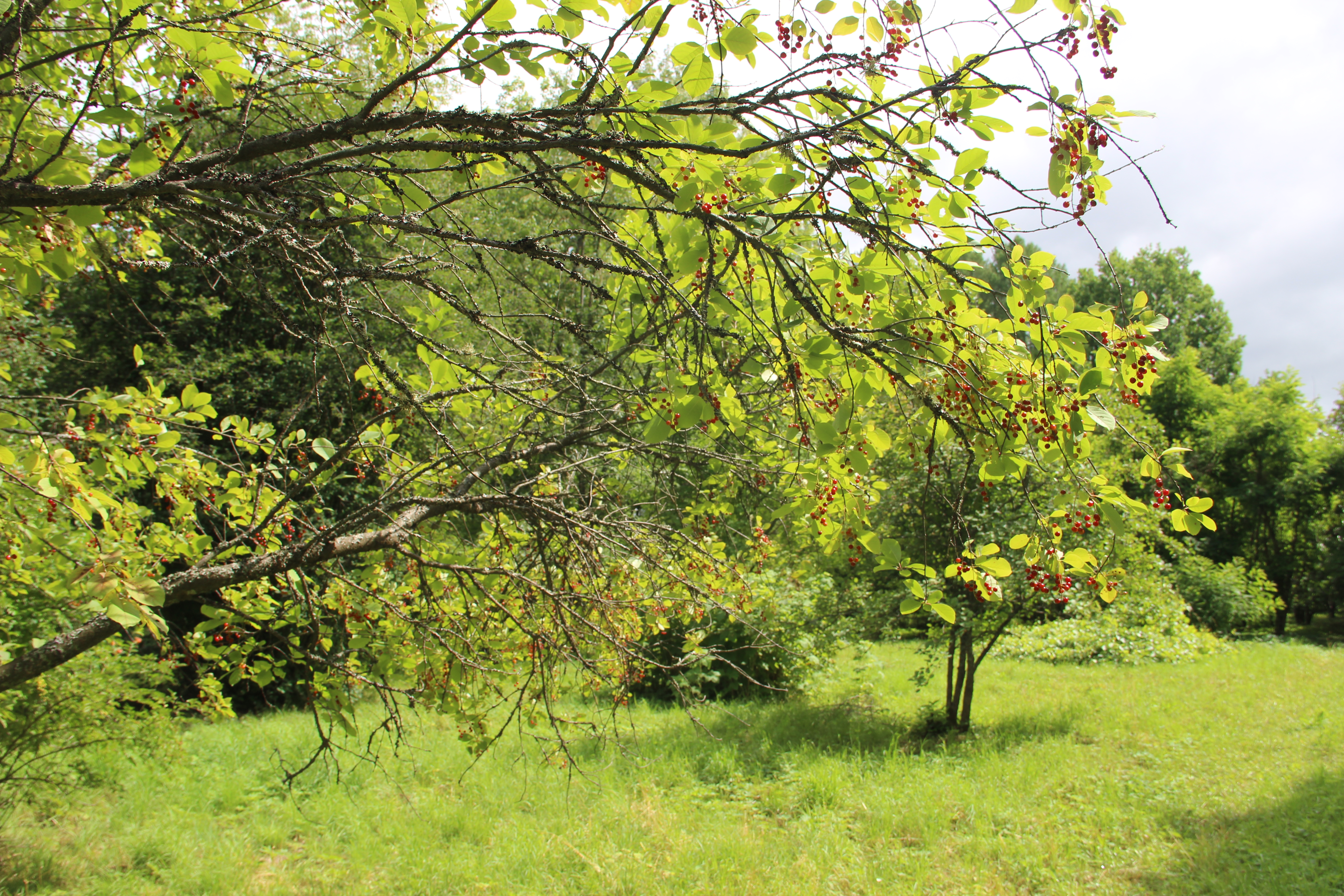
Branches with fruit

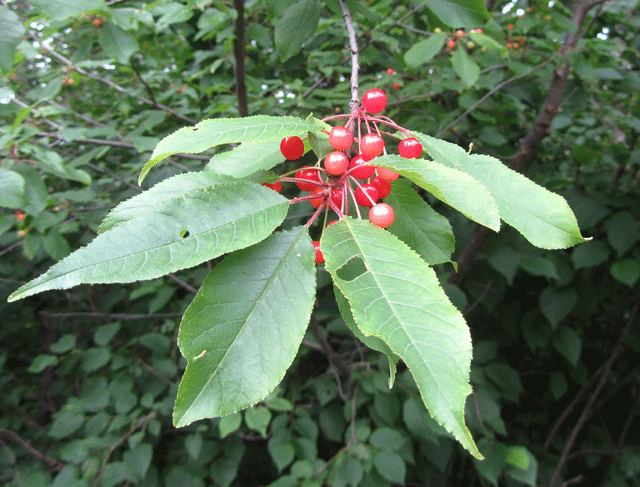
Foliage and fruit

== Distribution ==
The species is widespread across much of Canada from Newfoundland and southern Labrador to British Columbia and the southern Northwest Territories. Additionally it is very common in New England and the Great Lakes region. It can also be found in the Appalachian Mountains as far south as northern Georgia and eastern Tennessee. Scattered growth of the pin cherry also occurs in the Rocky Mountains, south to Colorado as well as in the Black Hills of South Dakota.

== Ecology ==
The pin cherry can regenerate by seed and sprout. Its flowers are bisexual and pollinated by insects. Seeds are dispersed by birds, small mammals, and gravity. As part of its reproductive strategy, pin cherries seeds can remain viable in the soil for many years. Seeds accumulate over prolonged periods, and soil seed banks may be viable for 50–100 years. Asexual reproduction is achieved by sprouting, and often thickets of pin cherry plants form.

The pin cherry is rather short lived, having a lifespan of only 20 to 40 years following a rapid maturation. Its root system is shallow, with roots tending to grow laterally. It is an important food source for many animals. Winter moose browse it in the Great Lake states and boreal forest region.

Though they are documented to sprout following cutting, individual pin cherry thickets are often killed if exposed to fire. Nonetheless, they have adapted as a species by the establishment of their seed banks which are protected from the most severe heat by their soil cover and fed by the nutrients in the resultant ash residue. Following a fire or other disturbance, seeds which may be dormant for years will germinate rapidly, stimulated by the altered conditions after fire. Combined with the rapid initial growth of seedlings, these characteristics enable groupings of pin cherry thickets to dominate many burned-over areas, particularly in the northern hardwood forest.

The pin cherry serves as food for various Lepidoptera.

== Uses ==
=== Culinary ===
Pin cherry currently has little commercial value, though recent interest in commercial production of pin cherry fruit has emerged. The fruit is edible and can be used in jams, jellies, and preserves.

=== Lumber ===
Pin cherry wood is light, moderately soft, porous, and low in strength giving it little commercial value. In general, it is not used for lumber and is considered a noncommercial species. It occurs in abundance, however, over a wide range of sites and produces large quantities of biomass in a relatively short time. The species has been described as well adapted to intensive management and chip harvesting on short rotations for fiber and fuel.
