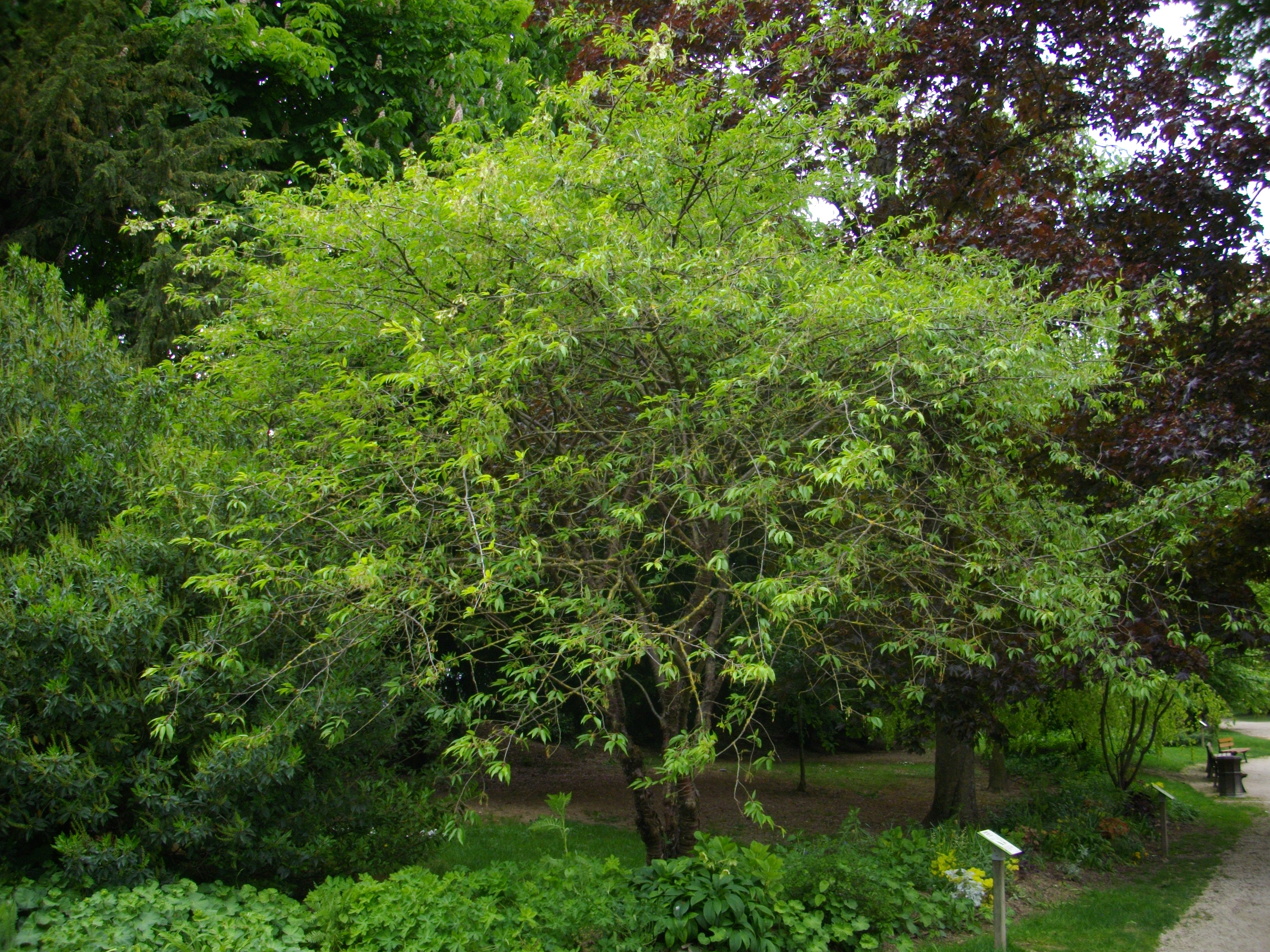
- Growth form

Scientific classification
- Kingdom: Plantae
- Clade: Tracheophytes
- Clade: Angiosperms
- Clade: Eudicots
- Clade: Rosids
- Order: Rosales
- Family: Rosaceae
- Genus: Prunus
- Section: P. sect. Cerasus
- Species: P. serrula

Binomial name
- Prunus serrula Franch.

Synonyms
- Cerasus serrula (Franch.) T.T.Yu & C.L.Li; Prunus odontocalyx H.L‚v.

= Prunus serrula =

Species of tree

Prunus serrula, called birch bark cherry, birchbark cherry, paperbark cherry, or Tibetan cherry, is a species of cherry native to China, and is used as an ornament in many parts of the world for its coppery-red bark.

== Description ==
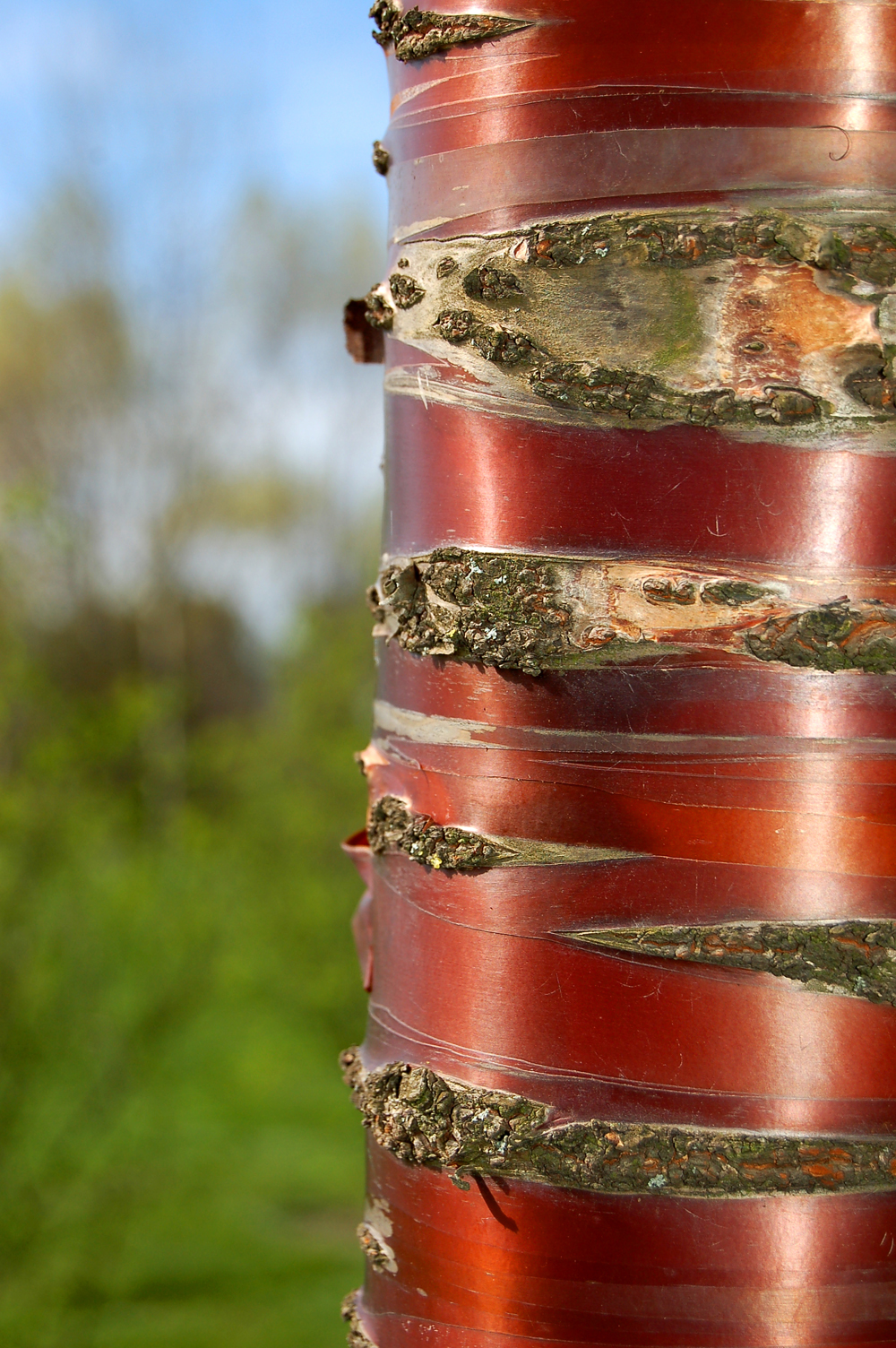
A closeup of the bark

Prunus serrula is a small deciduous tree, often with multiple stems, reaching a height of 20–30 feet (6–9 m). The leaves are arranged alternately, simple, 5–10 cm long and 1.5–2.0 cm broad and a serrate margin. The smooth bark is a brownish red, with prominent horizontal lenticels. The outer layer of the bark is remarkably tough, approaching the strength of Mylar.

=== Flowers ===
The flowers, typical of Prunus, are produced in clusters of one to three. The fruit is a small oval bright red drupe.

== Cultivation ==
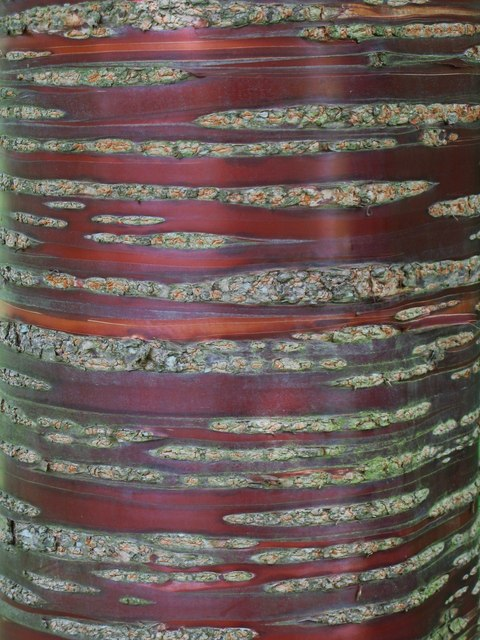
Bark of an older specimen

Prunus serrula is grown as an ornamental tree, especially for winter interest. It tolerates a variety of soil types and has a wide pH range. It prefers full sun and does well in USDA hardiness zones 5 to 8. Its potential as an invasive species is low, as it is susceptible to many common garden diseases and pests such as fire blight, powdery mildew and Japanese beetles.

It is sometimes grafted to Prunus serrulata (Japanese cherry) crowns, forming a tree with red bark and showier flowers.

In 2012 the 'Branklyn' variety gained the Royal Horticultural Society's Award of Garden Merit.
