= Prunus polytricha =

Scientific classification
- Kingdom: Plantae
- Clade: Tracheophytes
- Clade: Angiosperms
- Clade: Eudicots
- Clade: Rosids
- Order: Rosales
- Family: Rosaceae
- Genus: Prunus
- Species: P. polytricha

Binomial name
- Prunus polytricha Koehne

Synonyms
- Cerasus polytricha (Koehne) T. T. Yu & C. L. Li

Species of tree

Prunus polytricha (Chinese: 多毛樱桃, hairy cherry, or 多毛野樱桃, hairy wild cherry) is a species of cherry native to Gansu, Guizhou, Henan, Hubei, Shaanxi and Sichuan provinces of China, typically found at 1100–3300 m above sea level. It is a shrub or low tree typically 2–12 m tall and prefers mesic hills and forest edges. It is found in old growth oak forests and in semi-cultivation in windbreaks. Its buds, leaves and seeds are consumed by the golden snub-nosed monkey (Rhinopithecus roxellana).
