= Cherry production in Michigan =

Aspect of agriculture

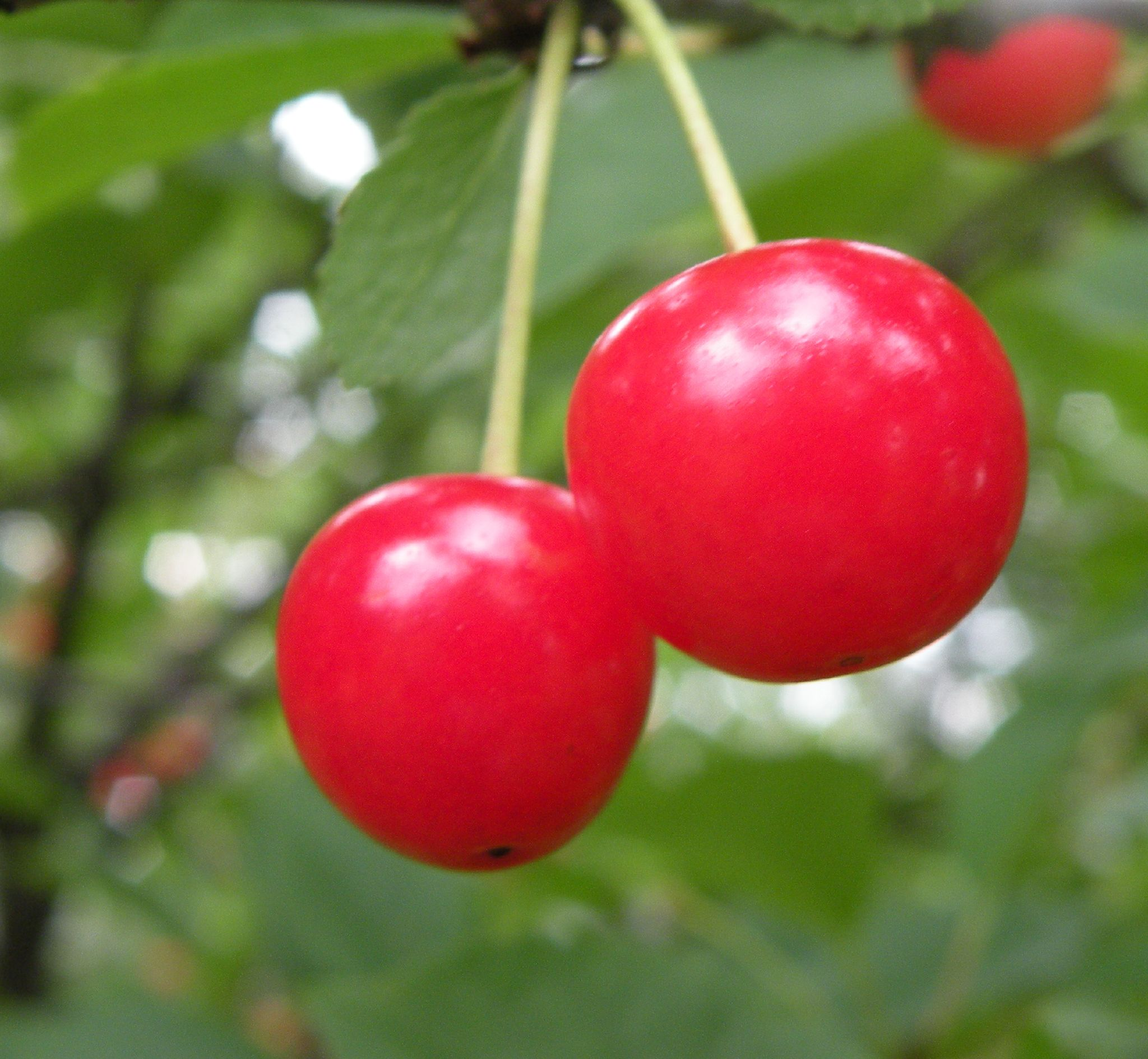
Montmorency cherries

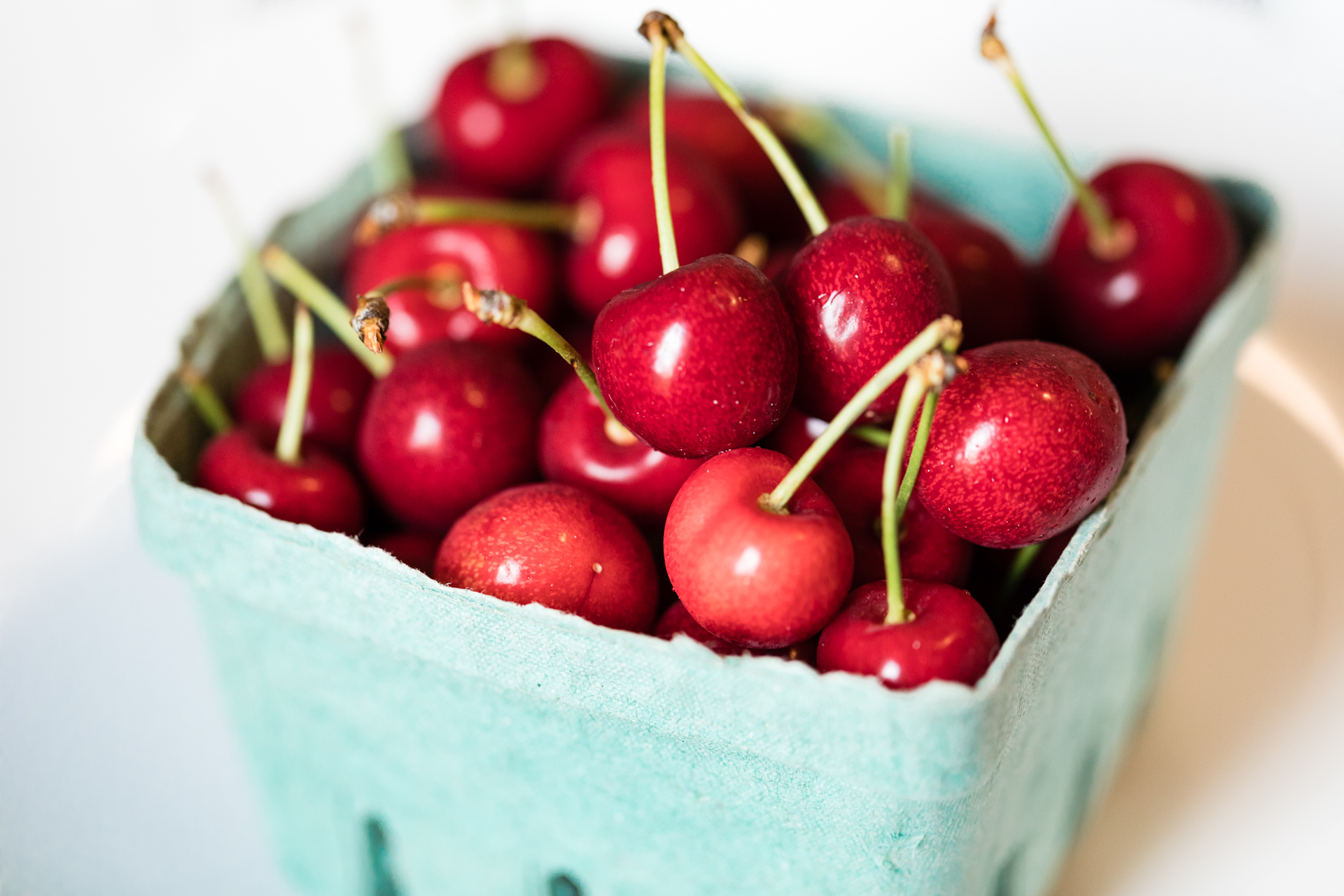
Cherries in a paper basket

Cherry production in Michigan is a major part of the agriculture industry in the state. Harvesting over 90,000 tons of cherries each year, Michigan is the leading producer of tart cherries in the United States. The Montmorency cherry is the variety of tart, or sour, cherry most commonly grown in the state. A Hungarian sour cherry cultivar, Balaton, has been commercially produced in Michigan since 1998.

Michigan's cherry industry is highly vulnerable to a late spring frost, which can wipe out a season's harvest. This occurred most recently in 2012, when over 90% of the crop was lost.

The Fruit Belt (also called the Fruit Ridge) of western Michigan, and, in particular, the Grand Traverse Bay region, produce most of the state's cherries. In addition, Traverse City hosts the National Cherry Festival each July.

== History ==
The first cherry trees were planted in Michigan in 1852 by The Reverend Peter Dougherty, who in 1839 established a Presbyterian mission at present-day Old Mission. In 1893, the first commercial orchard was established on the Old Mission Peninsula, north of Traverse City.

== See also ==
- Cherry production in the United States
- Agriculture in Washington state
- Michigan wine
