= Morello cherry =

Sour cherry cultivar

Morello is the most widely planted cultivar group of sour cherry (Prunus cerasus subsp. acida) in Central Europe. It is a late-ripening cherry with high yields.

It also gives its name to a group of varieties of the subspecies acida: the tarter, dark-juiced morello cherries. These include the varieties "Balaton", "Ostheim" and "Fanal". On the other hand, the morello cherry in the narrower sense consists of a mixture of forms that have a certain genetic diversity and from which some named clones have been selected, like "Scharö" and "Boscha".

== Description ==
The tree is weak to medium-growing with thin shoots and a shrub-like growth habit.

It is (usually) self-fertile and therefore does not require a pollinator for fruit set, but can pollinate other late-flowering cherry varieties.

=== Fruit ===
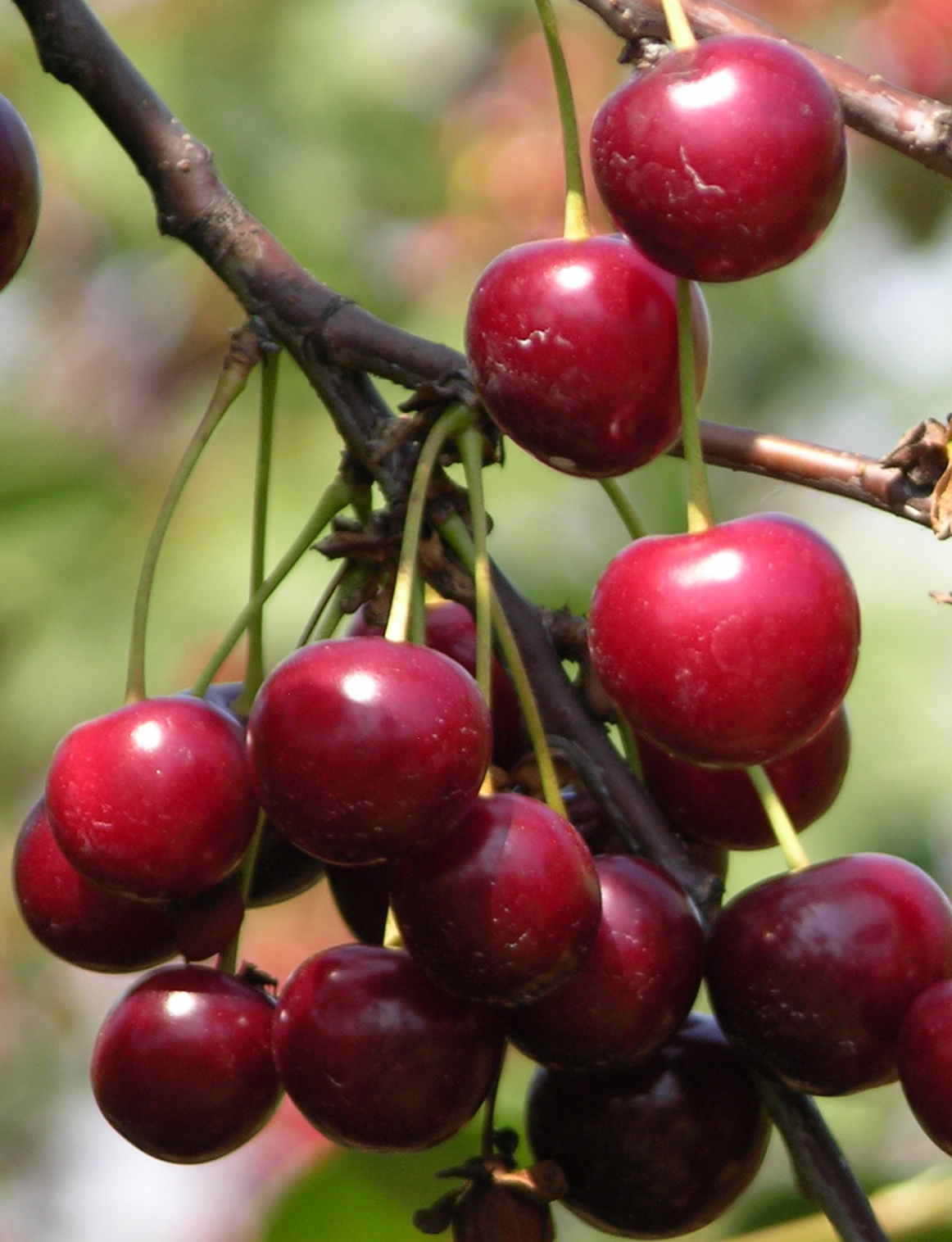

Fruit occurs only on year-old shoots. The fruit stalk is of medium length at around 40 mm (1.6 in) and usually has one or more leaflets. The drupe is large to very large at around 21 mm and 5.3 grams, roundish to slightly oval, depending on the yield. The colour of the firm skin has a matt sheen. It is initially red and turns darker to blackish red when fully ripe. The flesh is soft and very juicy and dark red. Despite the high sugar content and a pH value of 3.4, it has a distinctly sour taste, which is intensified even more by cooking. The stone is relatively large at around 12.5 mm (0.49 in), elongated-oval in shape, separates very easily from the flesh and usually remains attached to the stalk. The fruit ripens in cherry weeks 8 to 9.

=== Site and soil ===
The tree is undemanding and also suitable for cool and cold locations, but is sensitive to heat and drought. It is susceptible to Monilinia tip blight. It prefers a semi-shady location.

== Cultivation and use ==
The trees require heavy pruning. Strong aroma and acidity make morello a standard variety for processing.

The fruit is often processed into jams and preserves. It is the most widely used cherry variety for all kinds of baked goods, including the Black Forest gateau. It is not recommended for fresh eating due to its strong acidity.

The morello cherry is also used to make kirsch, cherry liqueur and pralines.

== History ==
The morello cherry is a well-known stone fruit variety that was already mentioned before 1650 and described before 1800. It originated in France where it is called Griotte du Nord or Chatel Morel.

A complete genome has been sequenced for a 2023 paper.
