= Frederiksdal, Lolland Municipality =

Manor house near Slagelse, Denmark

Frederiksdal
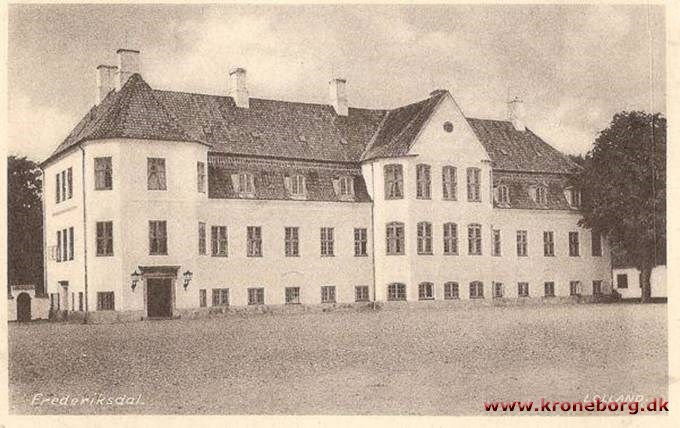
- Interactive map of the Frederiksdal area

General information
- Architectural style: Neoclassical
- Location: Frederiksdalsvej 30; 4912 Harpelunde, Denmark
- Coordinates: 54°54′15″N 11°2′29″E
- Completed: 1758

Design and construction
- Architect: Andreas Kirkerup

Frederiksdal is a manor house and estate located 10 km northwest of Nakskov on Lolland, in southeastern Denmark. The estate covers 538 hectares of land. It is known for its fortified cherry wine.

== History ==
=== Grimsted ===
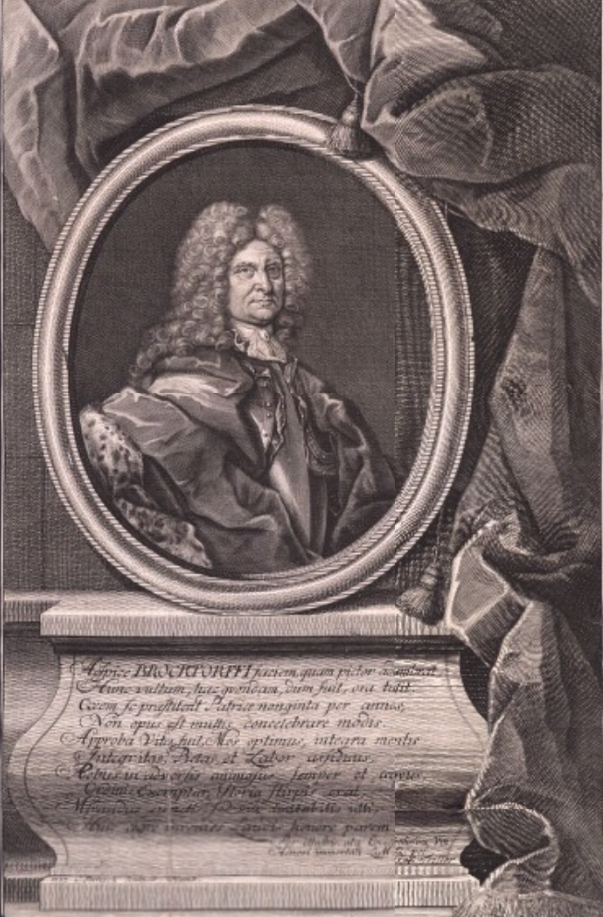
DitlevBrockdorff (1642–1732)

The estate was originally called Grimsted and is first mentioned in 1305 but not referred to as a manor until the 16th century. It was by then possibly owned by Niels Vincentsen Lunge, a member of the Privy Council and the owner of nearby Asserstrup. who on his death in 1552 left the estate to his daughter Anne Lunge. Sje married Knud Steensen in1558. After his death in 1575 she resided on the estate for several periods of time. She also outlived their only child and on her death in 1602 Grimsted therefore passed to her 9-year-old grandson, Christoffer Steensen, who in 1635 married Birgitte Mormand, whose family owned Bramsløkke. On Christoffer Steensen's death in 1657, Grimsted passed to his son Hans Steensen. Two years later, he sold the estate to Johan Hieronimus Hoffmann.

Hoffmann's widow in 1707 sold Grimsted to Joachim Brockdorff. Joachim Brockdorff died suddenly in 1714 and Grimsted was then taken over by his father, Ditlev Brockdorff, who on his death left it to his grandson Schack Brockdorff. His creditors took over the estate in 1744. This resulted in a prolonged legal dispute over the right to the estate. In 1750, Grimsted was sold in a forced auction to Laurits Pedersen Smith.

=== Knuth family ===
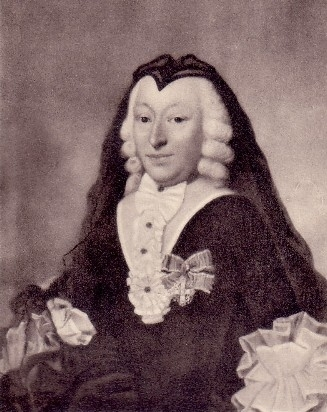
Ida Margrethe Reventlow

In 1752, Smith sold the estate to Ida Margrethe Knuth, née Reventlow, the widow of the first Count of Knuthenborg. She renamed it Frederiksdal after her second-eldest son, son Christian Frederik Knuth, for whom she had created the Barony of Chhristianssæde in 1743. His wasteful lifestyle and poor management of his estates drove the barony into economic ruin and in 1782, against an annual pension, he had to cede it to his son Adam Christopher Knuth.

=== Later history ===
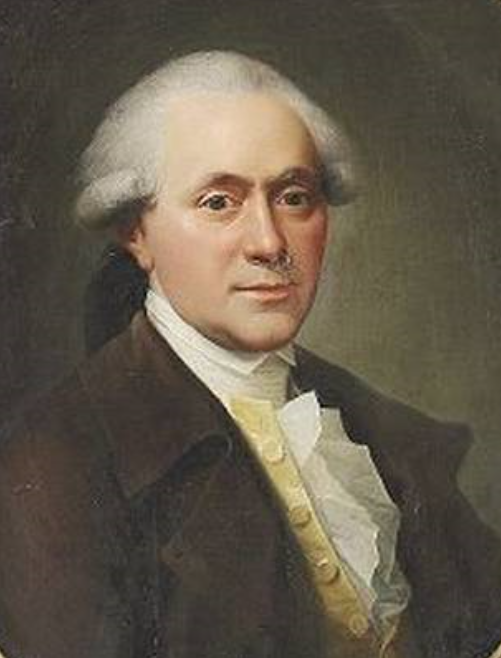
Heinrich von Bolten (1734–1790)

In 1784 Adam Christopher Knuth also bought Frederiksdal from his father but later that same year sold the estate and nearby Asserstrup to Heinrich von Bolten. Bolten, who was also struggling with economic problems, just two years later had to sell the two estates. The buyers were J.B. Paasche and S.A. Dons. They later shared the estates, leaving Frederiksdal in the hands of Paasche while Asserstrup went to Dons. In 1797, Dons sold Asserstrup and instead purchased Frederiksdal from his former partner. He converted the copyholds to freeholds and sold Købelev Church and the farm Stensgård. On his death in 1828, the remains of the estate was sold to Rasmus Martin Clausen. In 1837, he sold Frederiksdal to the German brothers Carl and A. Burchard. After a few years, Carl Burchard bought out his brother. In 1847, he sold it to Anton Martin Julius Nyholm. He owned and managed the estate for more than 40 years.

In 1890, Frederiksdal was acquired by Daniel Frederic le Maire. He renovated the buildings and improved the management of the land. His widow, Johanne Beate le Maire, kept Frederiksdal until her death in 1955.

== Architecture ==
The current main building was built in 1756–1758 to a design by the architect Georg Diderich Tschierscke.

The Garden Room contains Rococo-style stucco decorations by the Italian sculptor Carlo Enrico Brenno.

== Today ==
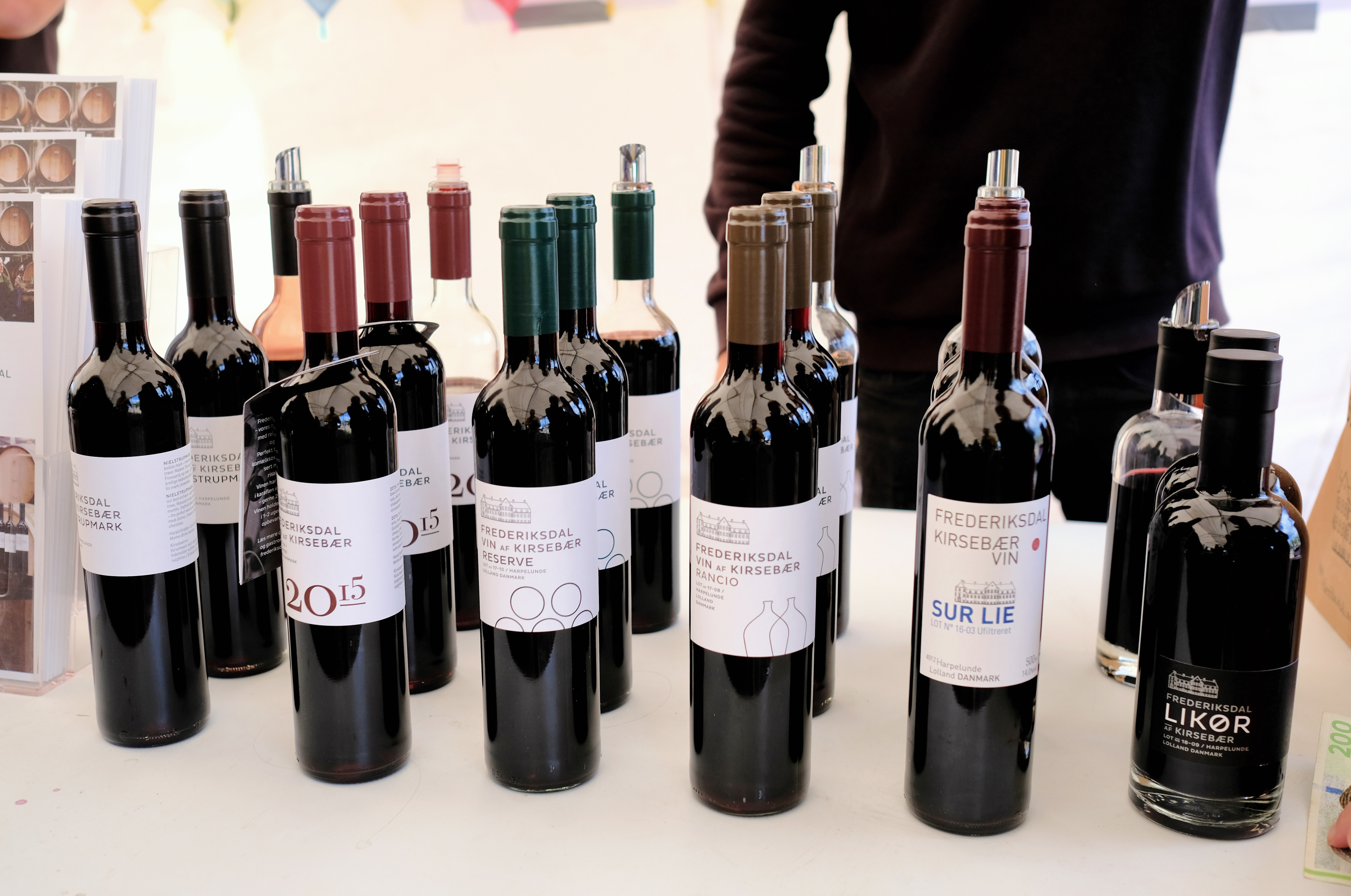
Frederiksdal cherry wine.

Frederiksdal is now owned by Harald Krabbe. The estate covers 538 hectares of land.

Frederiksdal produces a fortified cherry wine made from Stevnsbær cherries grown on the estate. It is the result of a collaboration between winemaker Morten Brink Iwersen, Frederiksdal-owner Harald Krabbe and chef Jan Friis-Mikkelsen.

== List of owners ==
- (1505–1552) Niels Vincentsen Lunge
- (1552–1558) Anne Nielsdatter Lunge, gift Steensen
- (1558–1575) Knud Steensen
- (1575–1602) Anne Nielsdatter Lunge, gift Steensen
- (1575–1594) Hans Steensen
- (1594–1613) Margrethe Eriksdatter Basse, gift Steensen
- (1613–1657) Christopher Steensen
- (1657–1686) Hans Steensen
- (1686–1688) Jakob Andersen og Mikkel Nielsen
- (1688–1696) Johan Hieronimus Hoffmann
- (1696–1707) Luttemelle Peters, gift 1) Vinterborg, 2) Hoffmann
- (1707–1714) Joachim Brockdorff
- (1714–1732) Ditlev Brockdorff
- (1732–1744) Schack Brockdorff
- (1744–1750) Niels Siersted
- (1750–1752) Laurids Pedersen Smith
- (1752–1757) Ida Margrethe Reventlow, gift Knuth
- (1757–1784) Christian Frederik Knuth
- (1784) Adam Christopher Knuth
- (1784–1786)Heinrich von Bolten
- (1786) Joachim Barner Paasche og Søren Andersen Dons
- (1786–1796) Joachim Barner Paasche
- (1796) Hans Jacob Lindal og Niels Schack
- (1796–1797) Hans Jacob Lindal
- (1796–1828) Søren Andersen Dons
- (1828–1837) Rasmus Clausen
- (1837- ) A. Bruchard og Carl Burchard
- ( - 1847) Carl Burchard
- (1847–1890) Anton Martin Julius Nyholm
- (1890–1924) Daniel Frederik le Maire
- (1924–1953) Johanne Beate le Maire
- (1953–1957) Boet efter Johanne Beate le Maire
- (1957–1975) Niels Jonsen Krabbe
- (1975–2000) Jon Henrik Nielsen Krabbe
- (2000- ) Harald Oluf Jonsen Krabbe

== See also ==
- Kærstrup
