= Kütahya cherry =

Kütahya is a centuries-old Anatolian landrace of sour cherry (Prunus cerasus). It is a mixture of forms. Individual high-performance clones have also been selected. It is the most important sour cherry variety in Turkey, which became the largest sour cherry-producing country in the world after the 1990s. In 2012, 16% of the world's total production of 1,161,312 tons of sour cherries was produced there. It is grown throughout the country, with concentrations near the cities of Afyonkarahisar, Kütahya, Konya, Ankara and Manisa, where climatic conditions are particularly favourable. Kütahya fruit is mainly used for processing.

The trees are vigorous and self-fertile. Young trees enter productivity relatively late and yield less than the Montmorency cherry. The medium-vigor rootstock variety CAB-6P shows good compatibility. The burst-resistant fruits hang on long stalks. They are very large (5.1 to 6.3 grams average weight) and have a slight tip towards the pistil remnant. Their thin fruit skin is darker red. Their flesh is sour and very juicy. The juice has a total dissolved solids content of 17%.
