= Stevnsbær =

Sour cherry cultivar

The Stevnsbær (also known as Løvskal or Heeringbær) is a Danish landrace of sour cherry (Prunus cerasus) with characteristically very small, very sour and strongly coloured fruits. Individual named high-performance clones have also been selected from this genetically more diverse variety, for example "Viki" and "Birgitte". The variety dominates sour cherry production in Denmark, where the fruits are processed into juice, jam and wine. The fruits detach readily from the pedicels and can therefore be easily harvested by machine, although the shakers can easily damage the trunks.

Its tolerance to diseases and different soil conditions makes it easy to grow, with medium resistance to Pseudomonas and high resistance to Monilia. On slightly more nitrogen-rich soils, the trees are almost as productive as the highly productive morello cherries.

The trees have medium to strong growing vigor and develop a pyramidal crown shape. Older specimens develop long, hanging shoots. They are self-fertile and flower early in the year. The fruits ripen very late (cherry week seven) to an intense dark red color and have a rather low tendency to burst. They are very small and therefore have a relatively high stone content. The shape is flat-round. The dark flesh is of medium firmness with species-specific aroma and easily separates from the stone. Acid and anthocyanin contents are characteristically high.

The variety has been cultivated for centuries under different local names. It was not until 1976, when a collection of local varieties revealed that many of the samples were of the same variety, that a common name was assigned and the first official pomological description was made. The naming was possibly based on the oldest documented geographical reference, probably due to a large production company being located there, to which the alternative name Heeringbær refers.

== Sources ==
- J. Vittrup Christensen: Beskrivelse af surkirsebærsorten Stevnsbær (PDF, 150 KiB), 1976
- J. Vittrup Christensen: Evaluation of characteristics of 18 sour cherry cultivars (PDF, 690 KiB), 1986
