= Balaton cherry =

Edible fruit cultivar

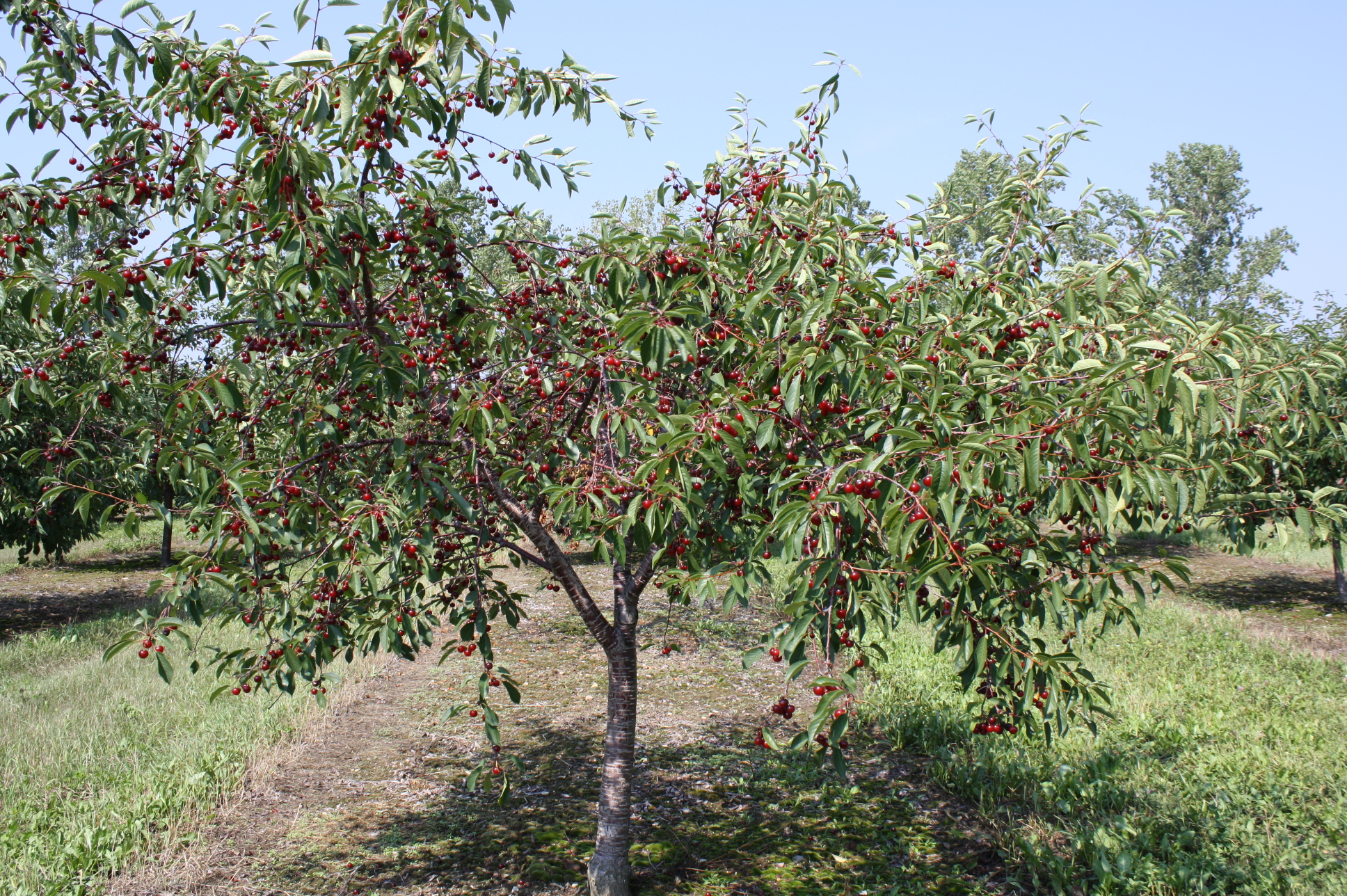
- A Balaton cherry tree
- Genus: Prunus
- Species: Prunus cerasus
- Cultivar: 'Balaton'
- Origin: Újfehértó, Hungary

The Balaton cherry is a cultivar of sour cherry (Prunus cerasus) native to Hungary, where it was originally named Újfehértói Fürtös. There are also some individually named high-performance clones that have been selected from this genetically more diverse variety, for example the "Kindelbrück". Balaton was introduced to the United States in the 1980s and is now grown there commercially. Extremely high yields, suitability for mechanical harvesting and positive fruit characteristics make for a commercially interesting crop. The fruit is particularly suitable for the fresh market, but also for processing (which is much more common with sour cherries).

== Description ==
=== Fruits ===
The Balaton is a Morello-type sour cherry. The fruits ripen in the (seventh) eighth cherry week to a dark burgundy color throughout both the skin and flesh (in contrast to the better-known Montmorency cherry, which has light-colored flesh). They are resistant to rain-cracking and ship well. With an average height of 16.58 mm, a width of 19.7 mm and a weight of 4.78 grams, they are comparatively small. The stalks, some of which bear tiny leaflets, are 43.26 ± 2.87 mm long and detach from the fruit without injury. The ripe flesh is medium firm, very juicy and only separates moderately well from the pit. It has a good sweet-tart flavor with comparatively high sweetness and less acidity.

=== Tree ===
The trees are very vigorous and develop broad, medium-dense crowns. Susceptibility to Prunus necrotic ringspot virus and Monilia tip drought is low. The glossy dark green foliage appears particularly healthy.

=== Growing characteristics ===
The Balaton is considered robust and vigorous. It is more sensitive to winter injury than other sour cherry cultivars. It has also suffered from disappointing yield quantity in many years. There is a certain degree of self-fertility, but it appears that yields can be improved by supplementing Balaton trees with pollen from sweet cherry trees. Measured against the best morello selections, the Thuringian top selection of the Balaton (on good soils) can achieve similar yield performance, with better, albeit still insufficient monilia resistance for fungicide-free cultivation.

== History ==
The Balaton cultivar was first grown around the small village of Újfehértó in eastern Hungary. The agricultural research institute of the Communist government of post-war Hungary implemented a rigorous selection process to determine the best sour cherry varieties for planting in the nation's collective farms. Samples were collected nationwide, and Balaton emerged as the winner. It was released commercially in Hungary in 1970. Dr. Amy Iezzoni, a horticultural researcher and cherry breeder at Michigan State University, introduced the cultivar to the United States in 1984. It was released commercially in the United States in 1998. Her Hungarian counterparts wanted the cultivar's commercial name in America to reflect its Hungarian heritage; it was named after Lake Balaton because "about the only thing an American can pronounce [on a map of Hungary] is Lake Balaton." Hungary receives a portion of the royalties charged on each Balaton cherry tree, some of which is shared with the cultivar's home village of Újfehértó.

== See also ==
- Cherry production in Michigan
