= Zuger Kirschtorte =

Swiss layer cake

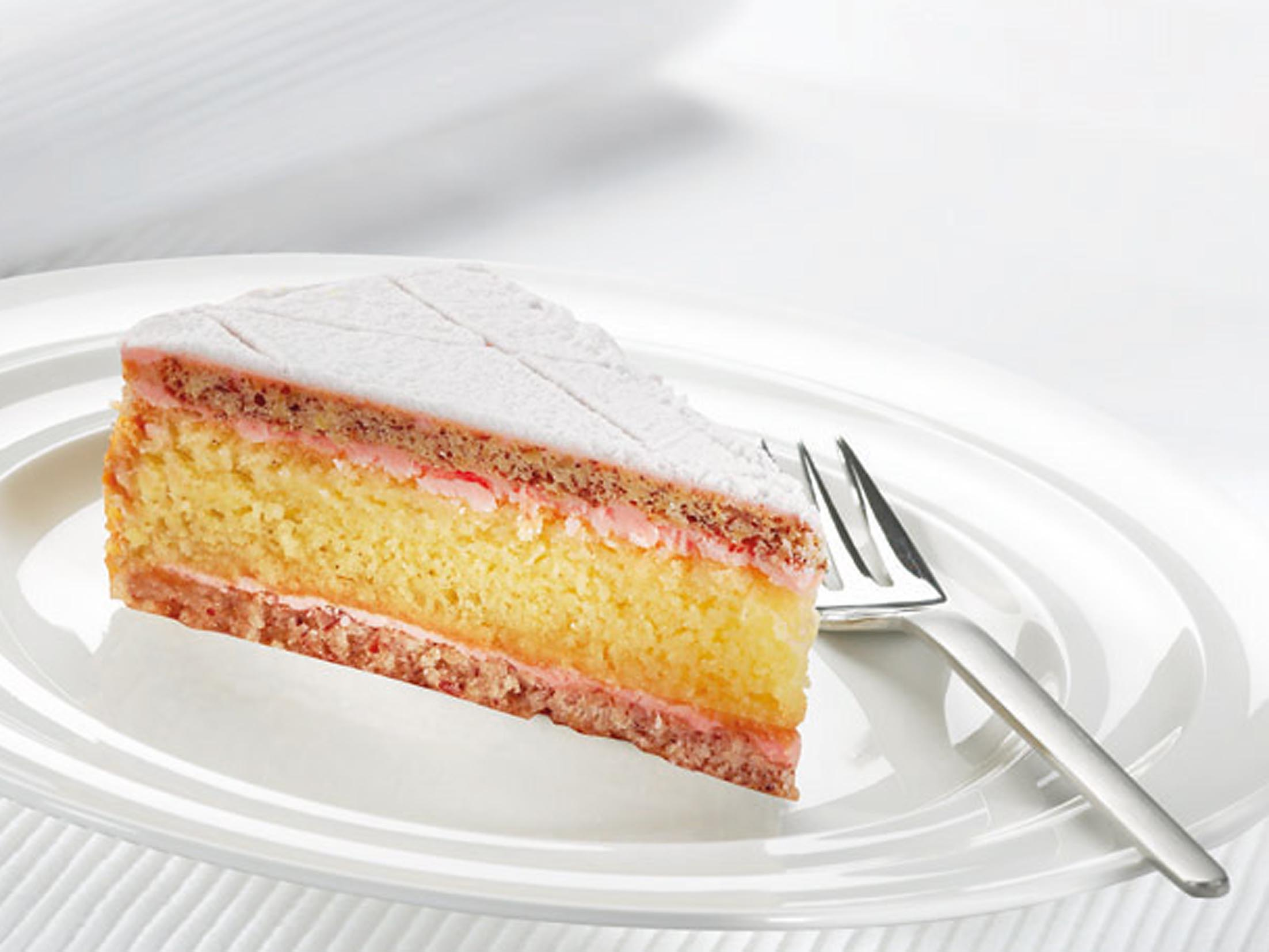
- Type: Layer cake
- Place of origin: Switzerland
- Region or state: Zug
- Associated cuisine: Swiss cuisine
- Created by: Heinrich Höhn
- Main ingredients: Sponge cake, nut meringue (almond or hazelnut), butter cream, kirschwasser (or other cherry liquor)

Zuger Kirschtorte (Swiss Standard German pronunciation: [ˈtsuːɡər ˈkɪrʃtɔrtɛ]; lit. 'cherry torte from Zug') is a Swiss layer cake that consists of layers of nut-meringue, sponge cake and butter cream, and is flavoured with the cherry brandy kirschwasser.

== History ==
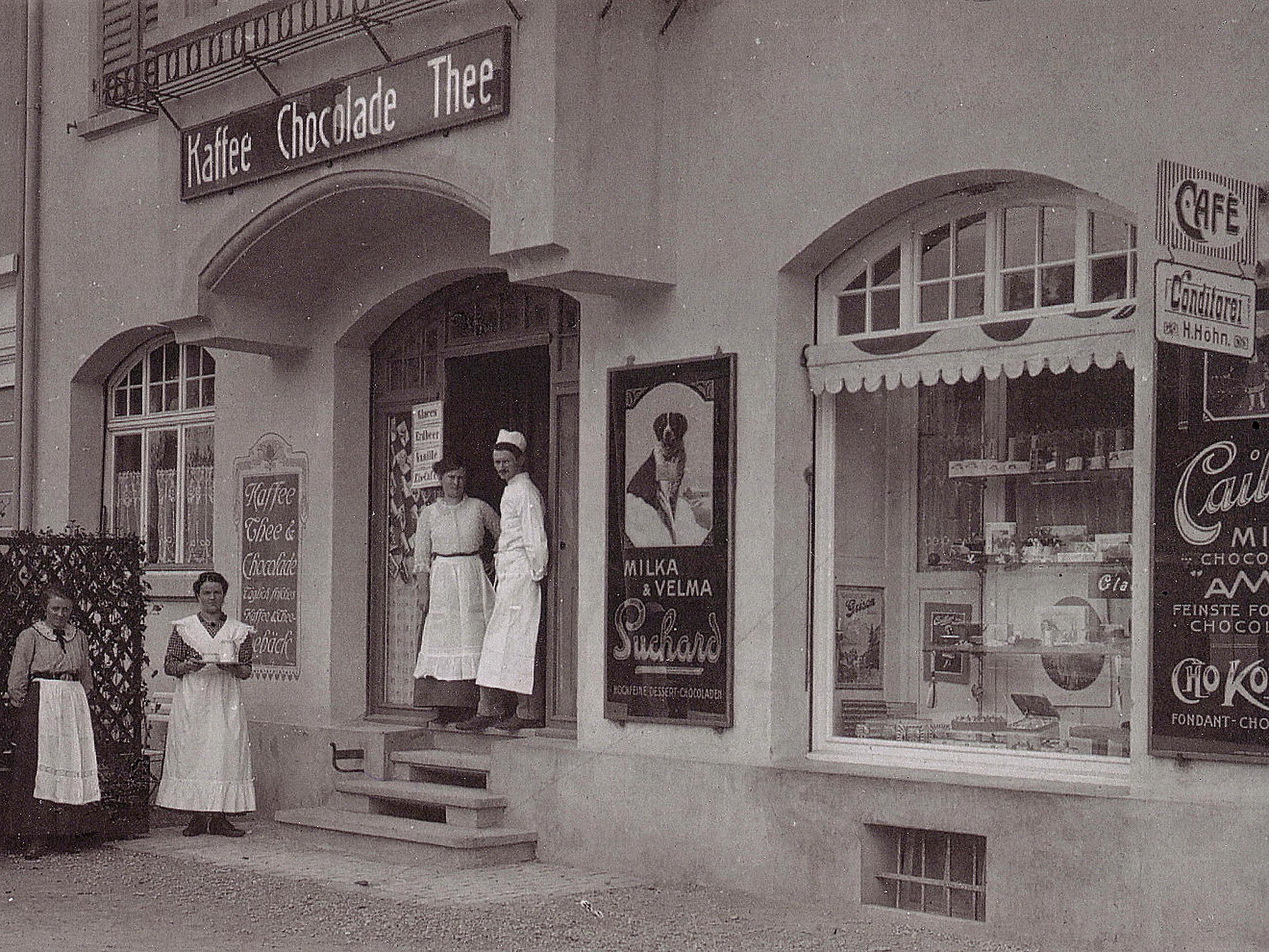
Heinrich Höhn standing in front of his bakery, together with employees, in 1913

Pastry chef Heinrich Höhn invented the cake in 1921 in the city of Zug. It won gold medals in pastry exhibitions in Lucerne in 1923 and 1928 and in London in 1930. In peak times Heinrich Höhn and his successor Jacques Treichler manufactured up to 100,000 of these cakes per year. The Treichler bakery has continued manufacturing and shipping the cakes up to the present day. The name is, however, not protected, so variations of the cake are also manufactured by other pastry shops in the region.

== Preparation ==
The chef first creates two thin rounds of Japonaise meringue containing ground almonds and hazelnuts, baked to a light brown colour, and one layer of sponge-cake. For the filling butter cream is prepared, flavoured with kirschwasser and sometimes tinted pink with food colouring (originally beetroot juice). To build the layer cake the buttercream is spread on one round of meringue, which is then covered with the sponge-cake. The sponge is then soaked with a mixture of sugar syrup and kirschwasser. Then follows another layer of butter cream topped with the other meringue layer, and finally the whole cake is covered with butter cream, the sides decorated with roasted sliced almonds, and the top given a light dusting of icing sugar.

== See also ==
- Black Forest gateau
- Cuisine of Switzerland

== Sources ==
- Article in the German Wikipedia
