= Black Forest gateau =

Chocolate sponge cake with cherries

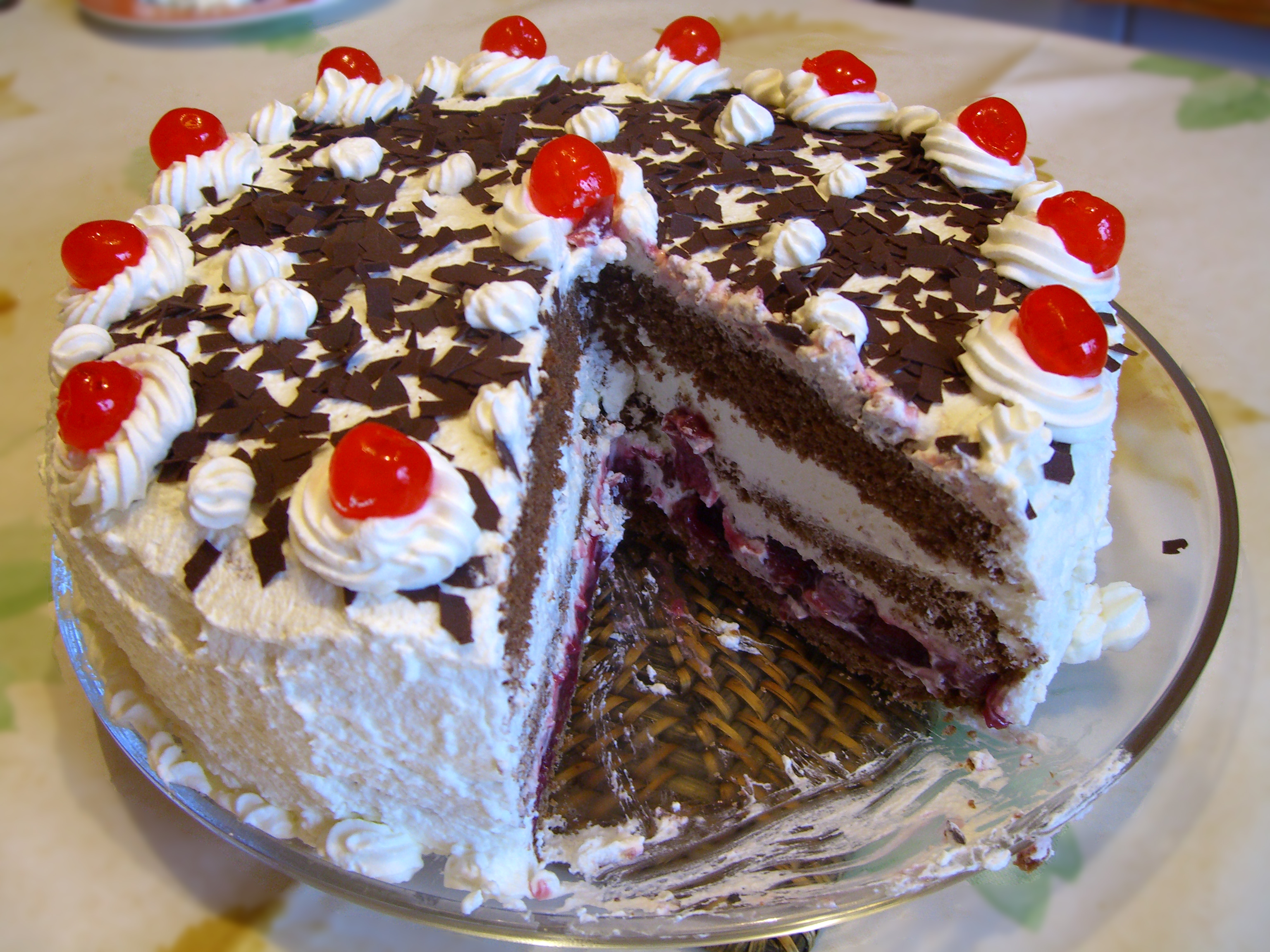
- Alternative names: Black Forest cake (United States)
- Place of origin: Germany
- Main ingredients: Butter, cocoa powder, cherries, eggs, flour, jam, Kirsch, sugar, and whipped cream

Black Forest gateau, (Note: Also spelled gâteau) (German: Schwarzwälder Kirschtorte [ˈʃvaʁt͡svɛldɐ ˈkɪʁʃˌtɔʁtə], lit. 'Black Forest cherry torte') or Black Forest cake, is a layer cake made out of sponge cake flavoured with cocoa powder, cherries, Kirsch, and whipped cream, with dark chocolate as a decoration. The origins of the cake and its name are disputed. However, the cake's recipe from 1927 is kept at an archive in Radolfzell, Germany. Black Forest gateau became popular in the second half of the 20th century and is now featured internationally in cafés and restaurants. A festival dedicated to the cake is organised in Todtnauberg.

== History ==
The origin of Black Forest gateau is disputed. The earliest known publication of the term Schwarzwälder Kirschtorte was in February 1915 in Brandenburg an der Havel. The confectioner Josef Keller (1887–1981) claimed in 1975 to have made Black Forest gateau while working at a café in Bad Godesberg. His son asserted about 1982 that Keller had invented the cake in 1915, though it is known that he could not have come to Bad Godesberg until after April 1915. He made the cake by mixing Kirsch schnapps, a cherry brandy, whipped cream, and cherries. Keller continued to serve the cake at his café after relocating to Radolfzell. Udo Rauch, the city archivist of Tübingen, cited the pastry chef Erwin Hildenbrand as having invented the cake in 1930. Although the origin of the cake's name is similarly disputed, the food writer Ursula Heinzelmann claims that it comes from the cake's resemblance to the Black Forest region's black, white, and red costume. According to a different theory, the cherries on the cake are supposed to resemble Bollenhut headwear.

The first written recipe of Black Forest gateau appeared in 1927, where it is kept at an archive in Radolfzell. Dr. Oetker featured a Black Forest gateau recipe for the first time in their 1951 cookbook. The recipe for the cake was protected by the European Commission in 2013, thus for it to be referred as Black Forest gateau in the European Union, the Kirsch in the cake must be produced from cherries cultivated in the Black Forest region.

Internationally, the cake was spread by German immigrants during the period of Nazi Germany. However, it only became popular in the second half of the 20th century. In the United States, where the cake is known as Black Forest cake, the cake was introduced by German immigrants. In the UK, the cake was among the most popular dishes at restaurants for several decades over the second half of the 20th century, forming part of the widespread prawn cocktail, steak and Black Forest gateau order. The cake is featured in the Portal (2007) game developed by Valve, which inspired an Internet meme.

== Ingredients and preparation ==
The primary ingredients of Black Forest gateau are butter, cocoa powder, eggs, flour, Kirsch, and sugar. The recipe calls for whisking together eggs and sugar, followed by the addition of cocoa powder and flour mixture and melted butter. After that, the cake batter is baked for 20 to 40 minutes. In addition, cherry jam is poured on top of the cake after whipped cream and icing sugar have been mixed and evenly distributed. Kirsch can be used as part of the cherry filling and frosting. On top of the cake, spirals of whipped cream and cherries are added. Dark chocolate can be added as a decoration.

=== Variations ===
The liquor is frequently left out of the cake in countries with a predominance of Muslims, while rum is used in Trinidad and Tobago in place of Kirsch, and some recipes call for cheaper blueberry jam instead of cherries. Non-cake variations of Black Forest cake include chocolate bars and ice cream.

== Reception ==
Since its inception, it has gained international recognition in cafés and restaurants. In Todtnauberg, a festival dedicated to Black Forest gateau is organised; at least up until 2014, it was organised bi-annually. Christopher Kull, the chief executive officer of the Black Forest Tourism Association, said that the cake is "Freiburg's most famous export". According to Priya Krishna of The New York Times, the cake is "a European artefact" that has crossed cultural boundaries, while Heinzelmann called it "the most famous German torte, at its best a marvellous combination of richness and lightness". Versions made with cheaper and more convenient ingredients, such as buttercream or inexpensive cherries, are common; Heinzelmann calls such a cake a "only a poor imitation of itself".

== See also ==
- List of cherry dishes
- List of German desserts
- Zuger Kirschtorte – Swiss layer cake
