= Ostheim cherry =

Sour cherry cultivar

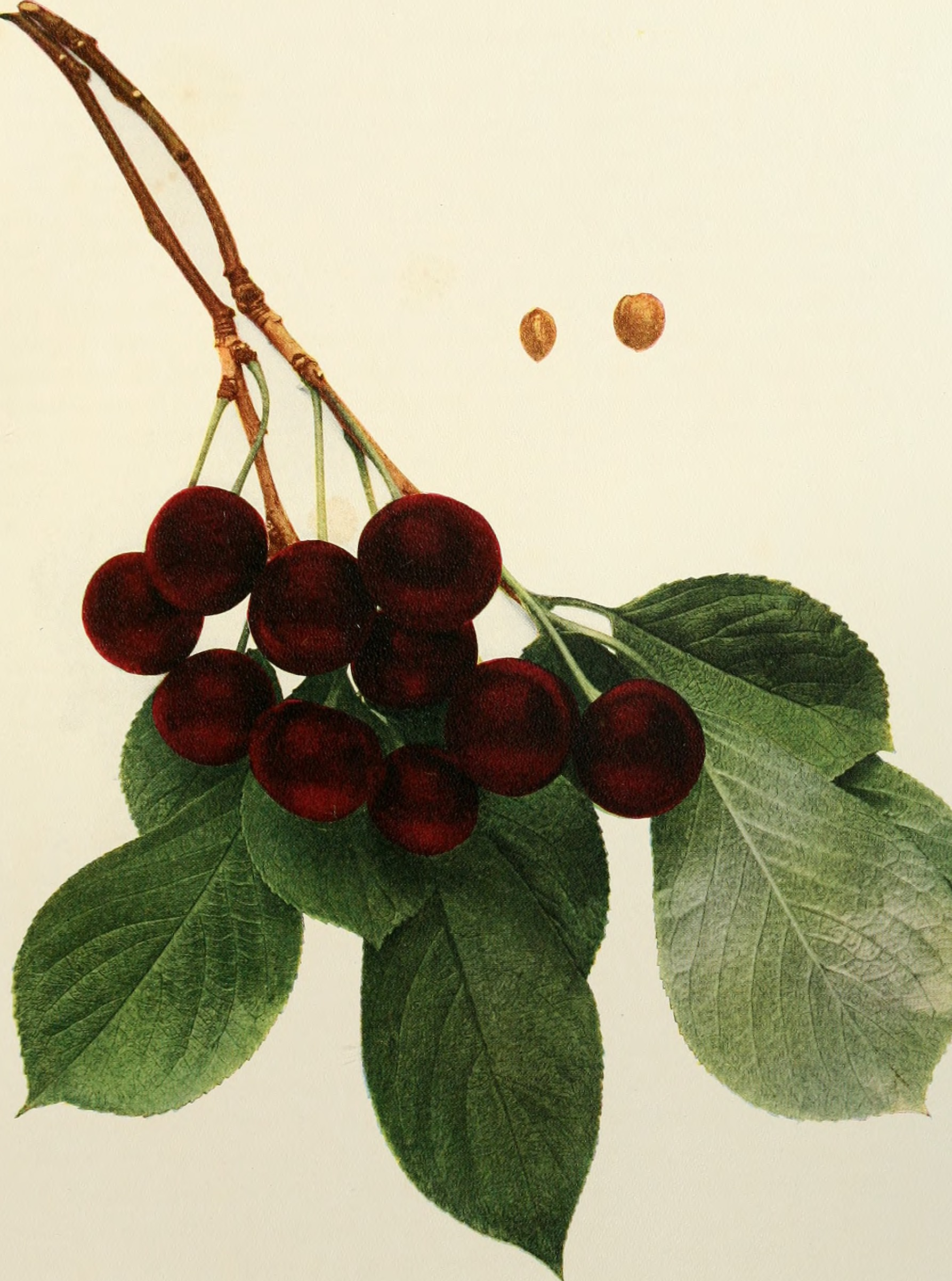

The Ostheim cherry is a variety of sour cherry (Prunus cerasus) that ripens relatively early. There are also individual named high-performance clones that were selected from this genetically more diverse mixture of forms, most famously "Reinhardts Ostheimer", "Naumburger Ostheimer" and "Kochs verbesserte Ostheimer Weichsel". The variety is recommended for fresh eating, but also for processing and has also been used as graft rootstock.

== History ==
It is purported to originate from the Spanish Sierra Morena and was brought to Ostheim vor der Rhön in 1714 by a military physician returning from the War of the Spanish Succession. Unfortunately, the most common method of propagation via root suckers favored the more prolific individuals, which, however, bear less. The variety used to be very well known and was one of the most widely cultivated varieties in Germany.

According to one of several hypotheses, the Hungarian Pándy meggy descends from the Ostheim cherry.

== Description ==
The trees have moderate growing vigor, a rounded crown and thin, drooping twigs. Self-rooted specimens have a shrub-like growth; suitable grafting rootstock can also produce a taller trunk. They are not very susceptible to disease and also thrive on poor soils and at altitude. Particularly heavy soils are unsuitable. The leaves are small and narrow. No significant pests or diseases are known.

Yields start early, but are not abundant. The self-sterile flowers appear early in the year, which makes them susceptible to frost damage. The fruits ripen somewhat unevenly and early (cherry week four or five). Left on the tree, they keep for considerable time without spoiling. They are eventually a matt shiny black-red and usually hang individually. They are small to medium-sized (depending on the reference), somewhat flattened and have barely recognizable sutures. The dark flesh is soft and juicy and easily separates from the relatively small pit. The fine, aromatic taste is typical of sour cherries with a pleasant acidity.

== Sources ==
- Walter Hartmann, Eckhart Fritz: Farbatlas Alte Obstsorten, published by E. Ulmer, Stuttgart 2008, ISBN 978-3-8001-5672-6
- Johann Georg Dittrich: Systematisches Handbuch der Obstkunde nebst Anleitung zur Obstbaumzucht und zweckmäßiger Benutzung des Obstes, tome 2: Steinobstfrüchte, published by Friedrich Mauke, Jena 1837, (pages 120 ff.)
- Description by the Rhöner Gartenfreunde
