= Vișinată =

Romanian alcoholic beverage

Vișinată (Romanian pronunciation: [viʃiˈnatə]) is a Romanian alcoholic beverage produced from sour cherries (vișine in Romanian), sugar and alcohol. It is very flavourful and sweet, and most often home-made. As a consequence, there is no "official" recipe for it.

Vișinată is easy to make, depending on the type of alcohol used. It is traditionally produced in small quantities, to suit a family's need.

The jar is filled halfway with sour cherries and an equal amount of sugar (by mass, not volume). The mix may be left to ferment for a few days, then the rest of the jar is filled with țuică or vodka (which stops the fermentation process) and sealed. The jar is then left in a dark place at room temperature for about 100 days. Contents are stirred around occasionally during this period to encourage proper mixing, especially during fermentation. At the end, the cherries are filtered out, and the resulting sweet drink is the vișinată.

The flavor is heavily dependent on the quality of the fruit. Therefore, it is advisable to use only hand-picked, healthy, well ripened, fresh fruit and avoid getting leaves, stems, or other debris into the jar. The maceration in alcohol will amplify any unpleasant taste in the fruit, such as with fruit that has started to rot, instead of masking it. Wood or leaves will release unpleasant tannins into the drink, which will soften with age.

Alternately, honey may be used instead of sugar. Few people do, however, since honey is more expensive, and depending on its type may not contribute in a positive way to the taste.

Some production methods involve the crushing of the sour cherries before putting them in the jar. Alternatively, the endocarps can be broken open and the kernels removed before being added to the jar. The kernels add an almond-like flavour to the drink. These processes add the risk that the resulting drink will not be clear, as filtering is more difficult.

Many people in Romania use single or double-distilled țuică (also homemade), which is not allowed to age instead of alimentary alcohol.

Aging the drink improves its taste - depending on the type of alcohol used, the initial drink may feel a little rough and burning. This rough sensation can be likened to that experienced whilst consuming carbonated drinks, hence vișinată is sometimes referred to by other cultures as "fizzy wine".

The remaining sour cherries are an excellent ingredient for cakes and pies, if used soon after removal from the jar - they get wrinkled and lose flavour with time.
