= Pándy meggy =

The Pándy üvegmeggy is a local variety of sour cherry (Prunus cerasus) with an excellent flavor and large, dark fruits. It is considered to be superior to the (English) Morello in several respects, but the trees are self-sterile and the fruit is susceptible to monilia rot.

From the diverse forms of the original seedling population, there are various high-performance selections such as the (officially approved) ‘Pándy 48’, ‘Pándy 279’ and ‘Pándy Bb. 119’. In addition, the formerly common vegetative propagation via root runners resulted in a number of sports with deviating characteristics.

== Description ==
The vigorously growing, high-crowned trees thrive on soil that is not too heavy and can tolerate dry locations. They are tolerant to the Prunus necrotic ringspot virus. They give an early, potentially high yield, given suitable (nutrient) conditions. It may vary greatly from year to year, though. The self-sterile flowers appear medium-late in the year and are not sensitive to frost. Nevertheless, fertilization depends on the weather. The fruits ripen in the fourth to fifth cherry week. However, there are varieties that cover a wide range of flowering and ripening times. There are leaflets on fruit stalks. The large to very large (3 to 5.6 grams, around 24 mm in diameter) cherries have a largely spherical shape, slightly flattened towards the stem. They are burst-resistant and suitable for mechanical harvesting. The firm, shiny skin develops a reddish to black-brown color. The dark, medium-firm flesh separates easily from the stone. It has an outstanding aroma with acidity levels that are very pleasant for fresh consumption.

== History ==
There are a number of hypotheses about its exact origin. It was spread throughout Hungary from the Nagykőrös area. Until after 1970, it was Hungary’s most widely cultivated variety and also gained international fame. Due to poor yields, cultivation declined even in Hungary. The variety was used as a crossing partner in most new sour cherry varieties in the decades around the turn of the millennium (in Germany and Hungary).
