= Oblačinska =

Oblačinska is a Serbian variety of sour cherry (Prunus cerasus). It is a genetically heterogeneous old local landrace from which several high-performance clones have been selected. It is one of the handful of sour cherry varieties with the most significant commercial importance worldwide. The fruits are mainly suitable for processing, for example jam, cakes and spirits.

== Description ==
The undemanding trees exhibit weak growth and produce regular and high yields early on (15 to 20 tons per hectare). They are very resistant to cherry leaf spot and cherry bitter rot (Glomerella ssp.).

The flowers are self-fertile. The high-quality fruits are quite uniformly small (little over 3 grams/piece) with about 9% stone content and even ripening. They detach from the stalks without injury, making them suitable for mechanical harvesting. Their skin is dark red and thin, and the aromatic flesh is medium firm and juicy with plenty of acidity (1 to 1.2%) and over 8 (to 10) % sugar (total soluble solids: around 17%).

== Significance and cultivation ==
In Serbia and Montenegro, sour cherries are one of the three most important fruit crops, with a harvest volume of 100,000 tons on 14,000 hectares. Serbia is one of the ten most important producing countries in the world and exports a lot. Oblačinska is the predominant variety here. Many years of cultivation in different environmental conditions and different propagation (including sexual) have resulted in a population of genetically heterogeneous forms. Most cultivation areas are concentrated in the south-east around Niš and in the province of Vojvodina. The trees are mostly cultivated on own roots and grown with an open vase/open center crown system. Grafted trees, on the other hand, are mainly grown as spindles on wild seedlings of sweet cherry and mahaleb cherry. Occasionally, the cultivar itself is used as a growth-moderating rootstock or as interstock for sweet cherry.
