= Ginjinha =

Portuguese liqueur

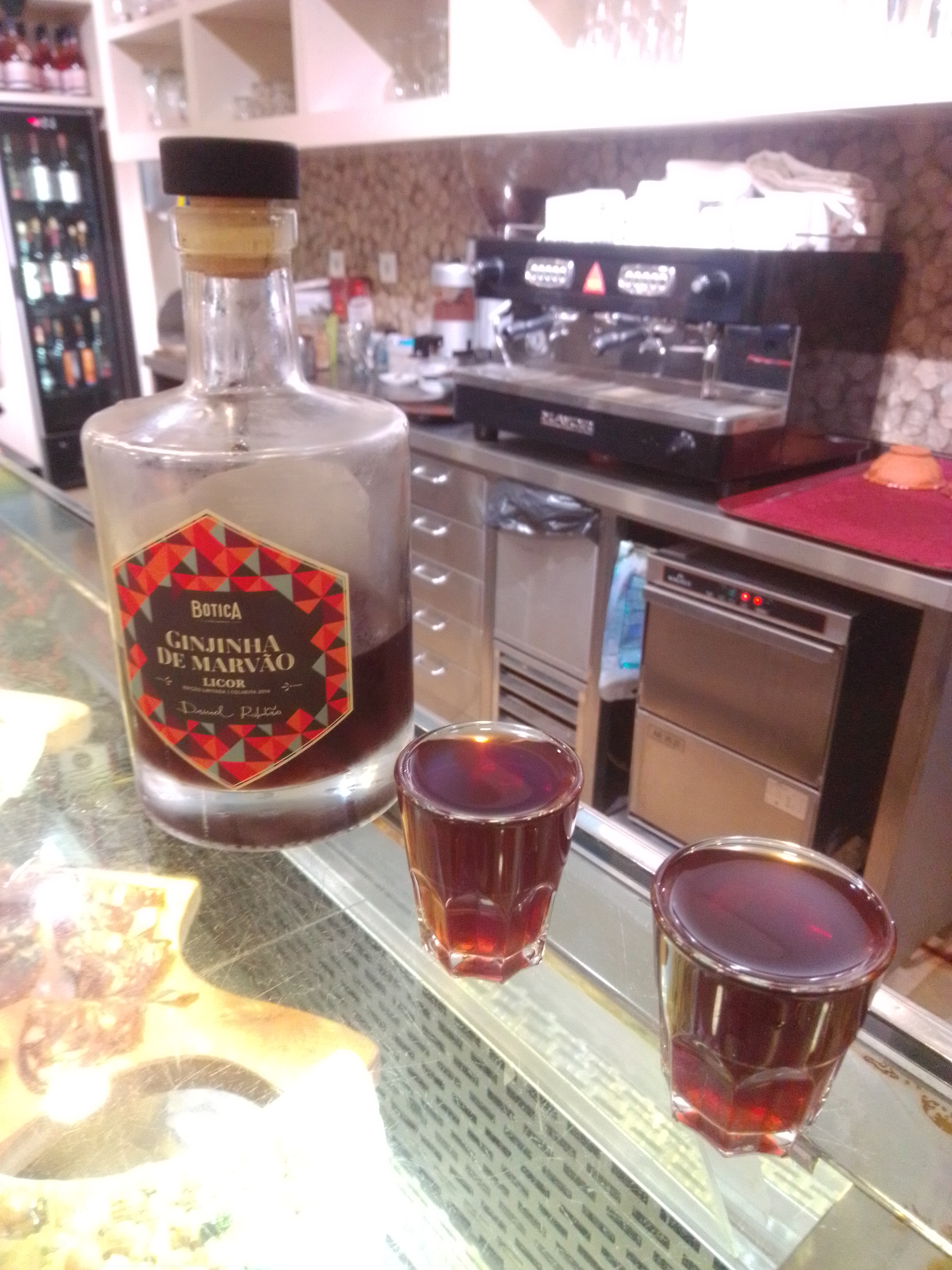
Ginja at a café

Ginjinha (Portuguese pronunciation: [ʒĩˈʒiɲɐ]), or simply ginja, is a Portuguese liqueur made by infusing ginja berries (sour cherry, Prunus cerasus austera, the Morello cherry) in alcohol (aguardente) and adding sugar together with other ingredients with cloves and cinnamon sticks being the most common. Ginjinha is served in the form of a shot with a piece of the fruit in the bottom of the cup. It is a popular choice of liqueur for the Portuguese and a typical drink in Lisbon, Alcobaça, Óbidos, Marvão, Covilhã and Algarve. The Serra da Estrela ginja, centred on Covilhã, has protected designation of origin.

== History ==
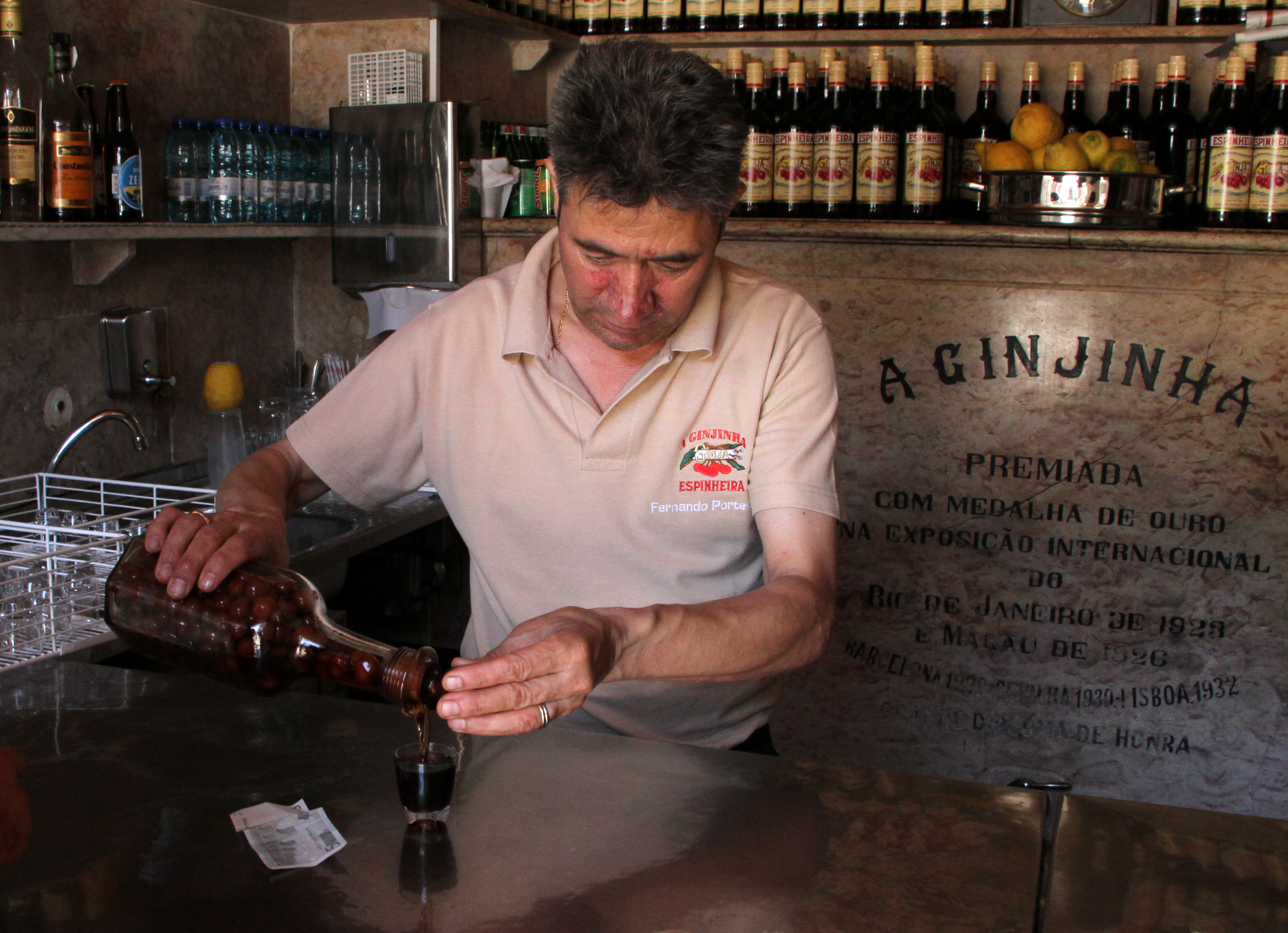
Ginja barman serving a drink

The Ginjinha of Praça de São Domingos in Lisbon was the first establishment in that city to commercialise the drink that gives its name to it. A Galician friar of the Church of Santo António, Francisco Espinheira, had the experience of leaving ginja berries in aguardente adding sugar, water and cinnamon. The success was immediate and ginjinha became the typical drink in Lisbon. In the 2000s, the business was in the hands of the fifth generation. Around 150,000 litres (33,000 imp gal; 40,000 US gal) of ginjinha are produced each year. Around 90 percent is consumed in Portugal and only around ten percent is exported, the majority of it to the United States. The traditional liqueur is served all around Portugal, but is especially prominent in the Oeste and Lisbon regions. In Óbidos, it is commonly served in a small edible chocolate cup.

== Ginjinha bars in Lisbon ==
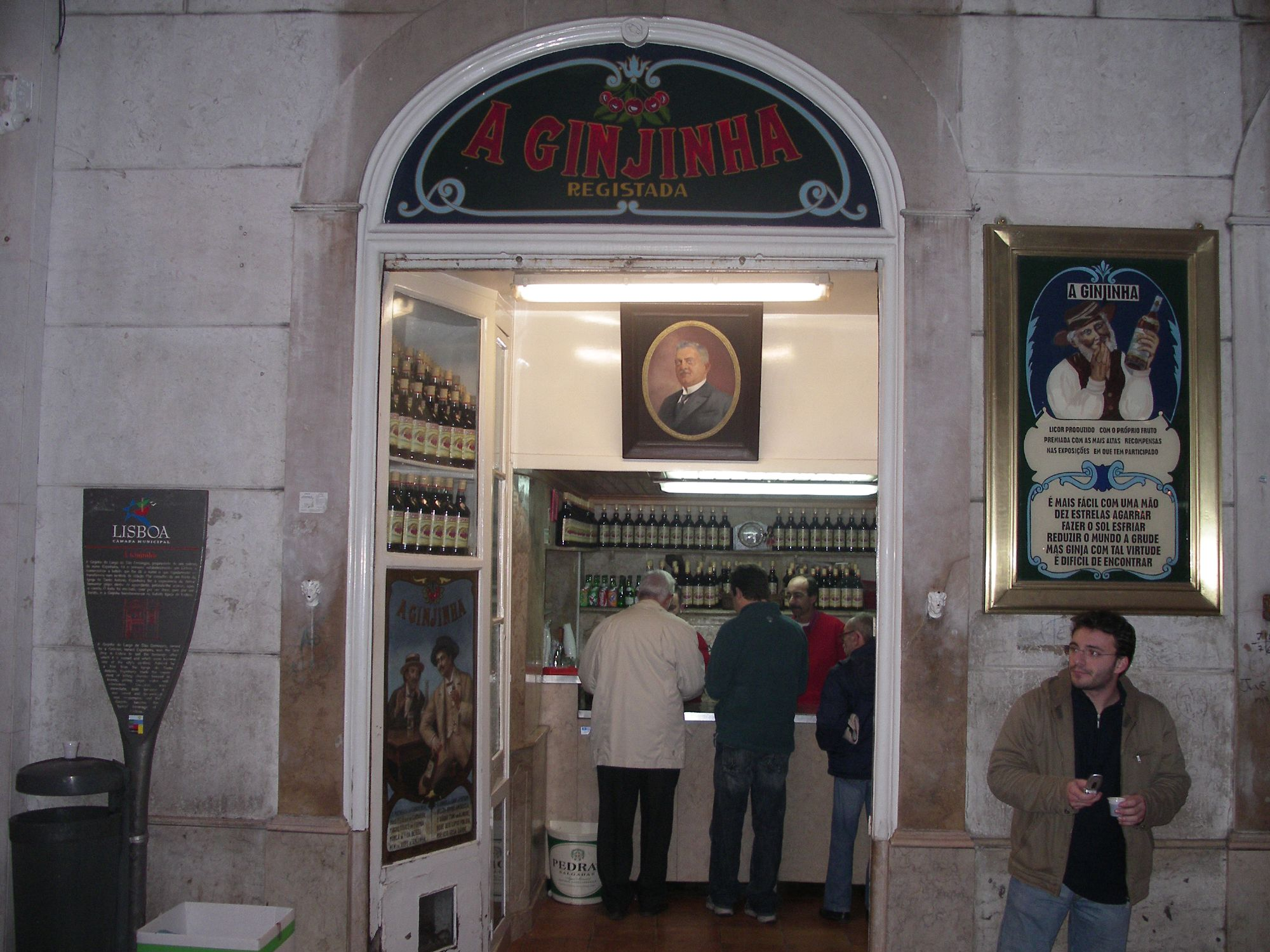
Ginjinha shop in Lisbon, Portugal

- Ginjinha Espinheira, since 1840
- Ginjinha Sem Rival, since 1890
- Ginjinha Rubi, since 1931
- Ginginha do Carmo, since 2011

== Ginja de Óbidos e Alcobaça ==
The sour cherry used to produce the Ginja from Alcobaça and Óbidos was applied for a PGI status in 2013.

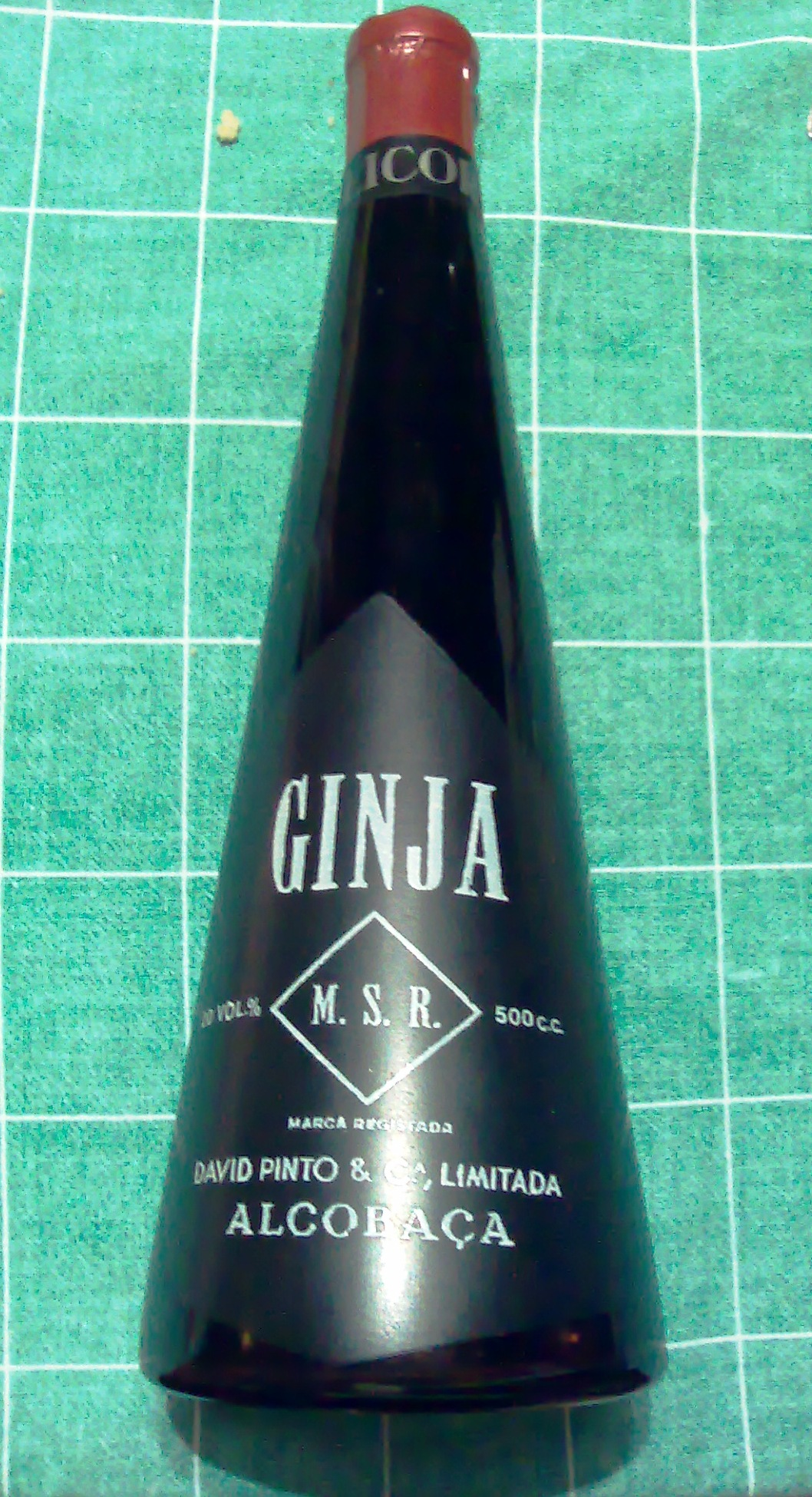
A bottle of Ginja from Alcobaça

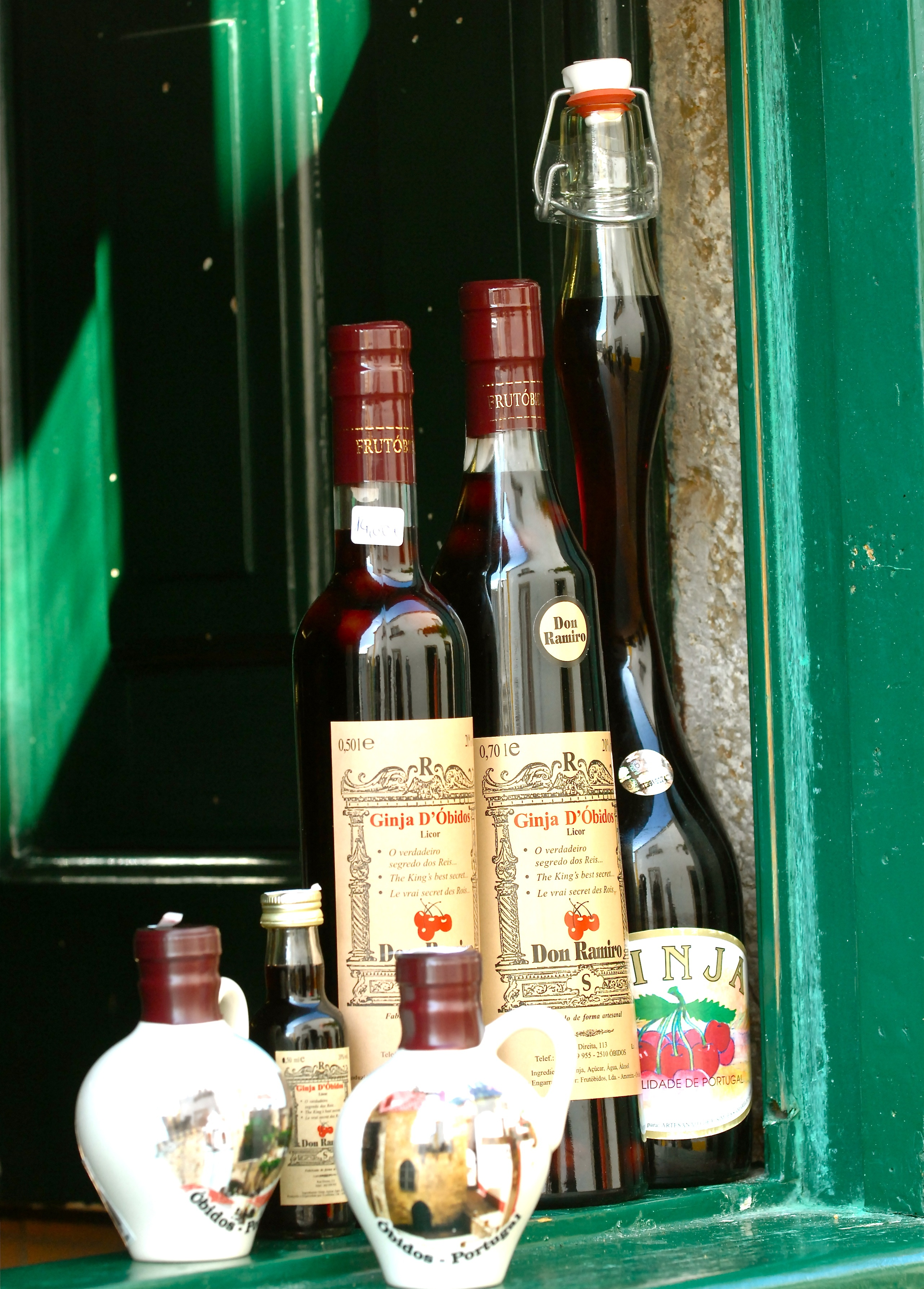
Ginja from Óbidos

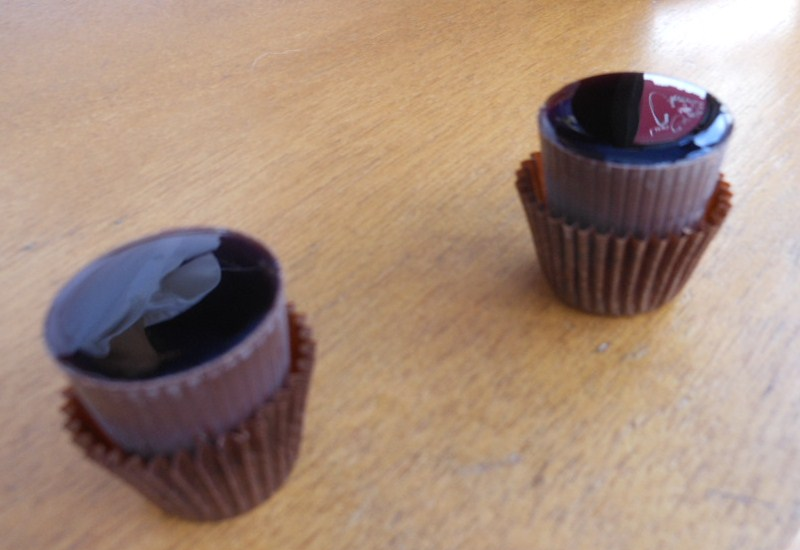
Chocolate cup ginja in Óbidos

== See also ==
- List of Portugal food and drink products with protected status
