= Fruit Belt =

American area with conditions for fruit growing

The Great Lakes lake-effect snow belts. A portion, but not all, of these areas contain fruit belts. Winter covering snow and the climate moderation that often accompanies it are only two of the necessary factors for economic fruit agriculture.

Fruit Belt is a term in the United States for an area where the microclimate provides good conditions for fruit growing.

Fruit Belts are prominent around the North American Great Lakes region, notably West Michigan (Fruit Ridge) and western Northern Lower Michigan in tandem, and the southern shore of Lake Erie. The conditions that produce a micro-climate favorable to fruit cultivation are the same that produce lake-effect snow; therefore, Fruit Belts and snowbelts are often concurrent. The map at right shows Great Lakes snowbelts which cover a somewhat larger area than the fruit belt. Notably, there are no Fruit Belts in Michigan's Upper Peninsula. A Fruit Belt also exists in Central Washington. Berries are grown on the West Coast.

== See also ==
- American Viticultural Area
- List of belt regions of the United States
