= Montmorency cherry =

Variety of flowering plant

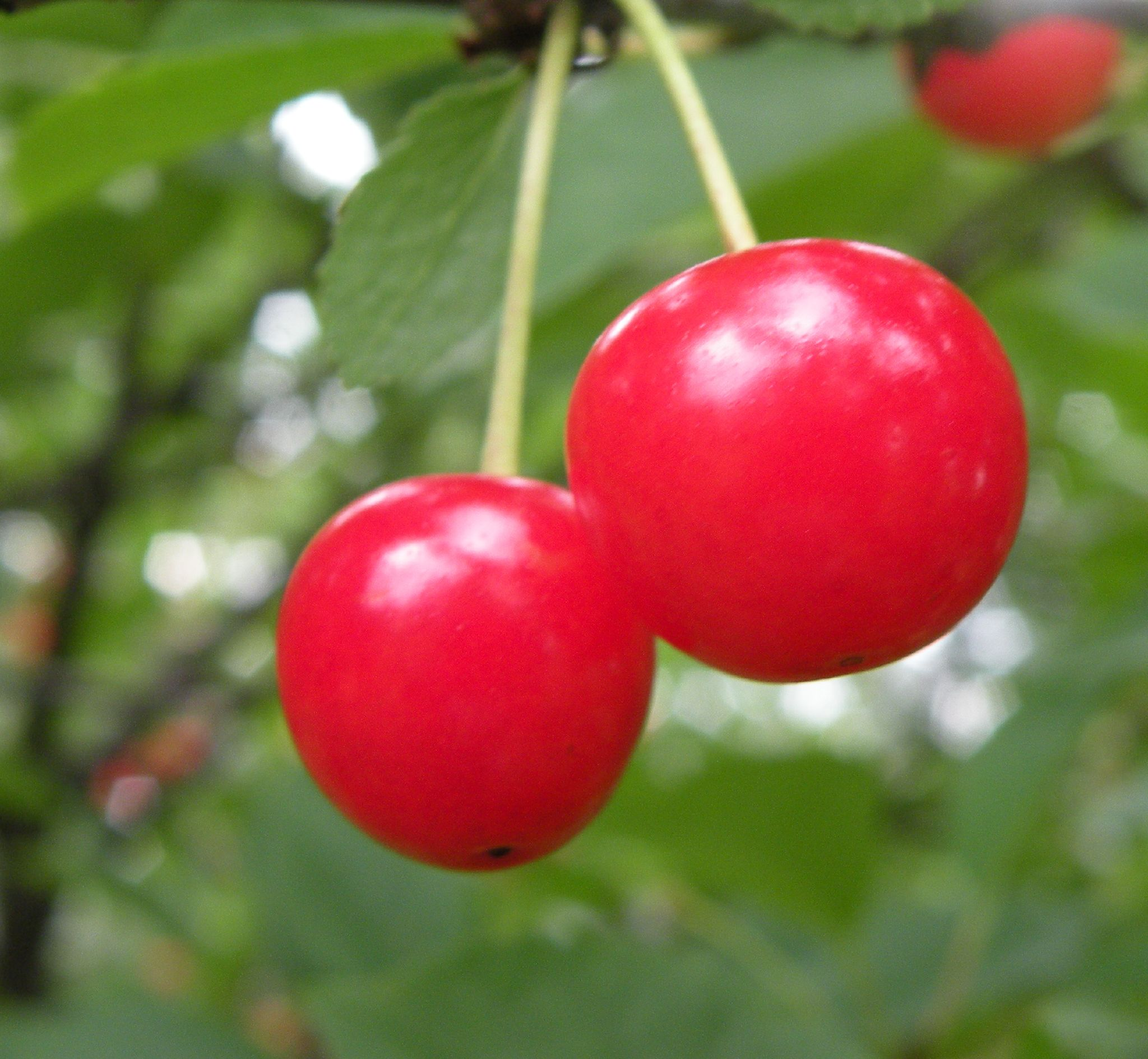
- Montmorency cherries
- Genus: Prunus
- Species: Prunus cerasus
- Cultivar: 'Montmorency'
- Origin: Montmorency, France

The Montmorency cherry (also known as the Common red Kentish) is a cultivar of sour cherry (Prunus cerasus). It is the most popular variety in the United States and Canada. The cherries are recommended for fresh consumption and for preserves. However, the main use is for processing, often for cherry pies, jams and preserves. Dried fruit, juice, juice concentrate and Kirsch are also available.

It is considered part of the lighter-red Amarelle group of sour cherries cultivars, rather than the darker-red Morello cultivars. There are several sports in cultivation. The tree is named for Montmorency, a suburb of Paris, France.

== Description ==
The tree is susceptible to cherry leaf spot. It yields rather steadily, mainly on annual wood. The large fruits ripen late. They have a very thin skin of a bright red color (although some trees produce a darker red fruit). The flesh is tender with a particular sweetness and consistency and colorless, slightly tart juice.

== Economic significance ==
Notable cultivation areas are or were Île-de-France in France, Ontario in Canada, Michigan and Door County, Wisconsin in the USA, and parts of Indian-administered Kashmir. Michigan produces around 90,000 tons each year (2012, 2022), primarily in the Grand Traverse Bay region. They grossed about US$0.45 per kilo in 2022.

== History ==
A book from 1690 describes the Montmorency cherry and mentions two varieties: one with long stems and one with short stems, with otherwise similar characteristics, but with the latter enjoying more appreciation.

It has been cultivated in the vicinity of the Montmorency forest since the 18th century. The communes of Soisy-sous-Montmorency and Saint-Prix are among the last places where it is still grown.

At the end of the 18th century, Paris received 7,000 to 8,000 basketfuls of cherries from the Montmorency valley each day. Cherries from this origin and from the hills of Meudon were highly prized by the nobility. However, overharvesting of the trees led to a gradual decline of the variety.

The tree came to the United States via England and has been cultivated in the United States since at least the early 20th century.

A complete sequenced genome was published in 2023.

== See also ==
- Cherry production in Michigan
- Michigan wine
