= Kirsch =

Brandy made from morello cherries

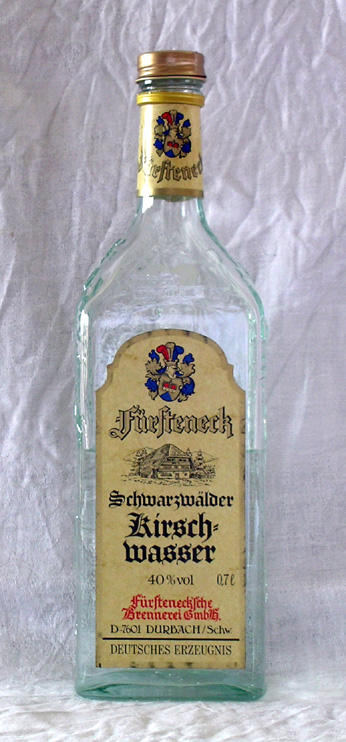
Kirschwasser, produced in Black Forest, Germany and bottled at 40% ABV

Kirschwasser (/ˈkɪərʃvɑːsər/, UK also /-væsər/, German: [ˈkɪɐʃvasɐ]; German for 'cherry water'), or just Kirsch (German: [kɪʁʃ]; the term used in Switzerland and France, less so in Germany), is a clear, colourless brandy from Germany, Switzerland, and France, traditionally made from double distillation of morello cherries. It is now also made from other kinds of cherries. The cherry stones are included in the fermentation process, not removed beforehand. Unlike cherry liqueurs and cherry brandies, Kirschwasser is not sweet. It is sometimes distilled from fermented cherry juice.

== Serving ==
Kirschwasser is usually drunk neat. It is traditionally served cold in a very small glass and is taken as an apéritif. It is an important ingredient in fondue. People in the German-speaking region where it originated usually serve it after dinner, as a digestif.

Kirschwasser is used in some cocktails, such as the Ladyfinger, the Florida, and the Rose.

High-quality kirschwasser should be served around 16 °C (61 °F), warmed by the hands as with brandy.

== Origin and production ==
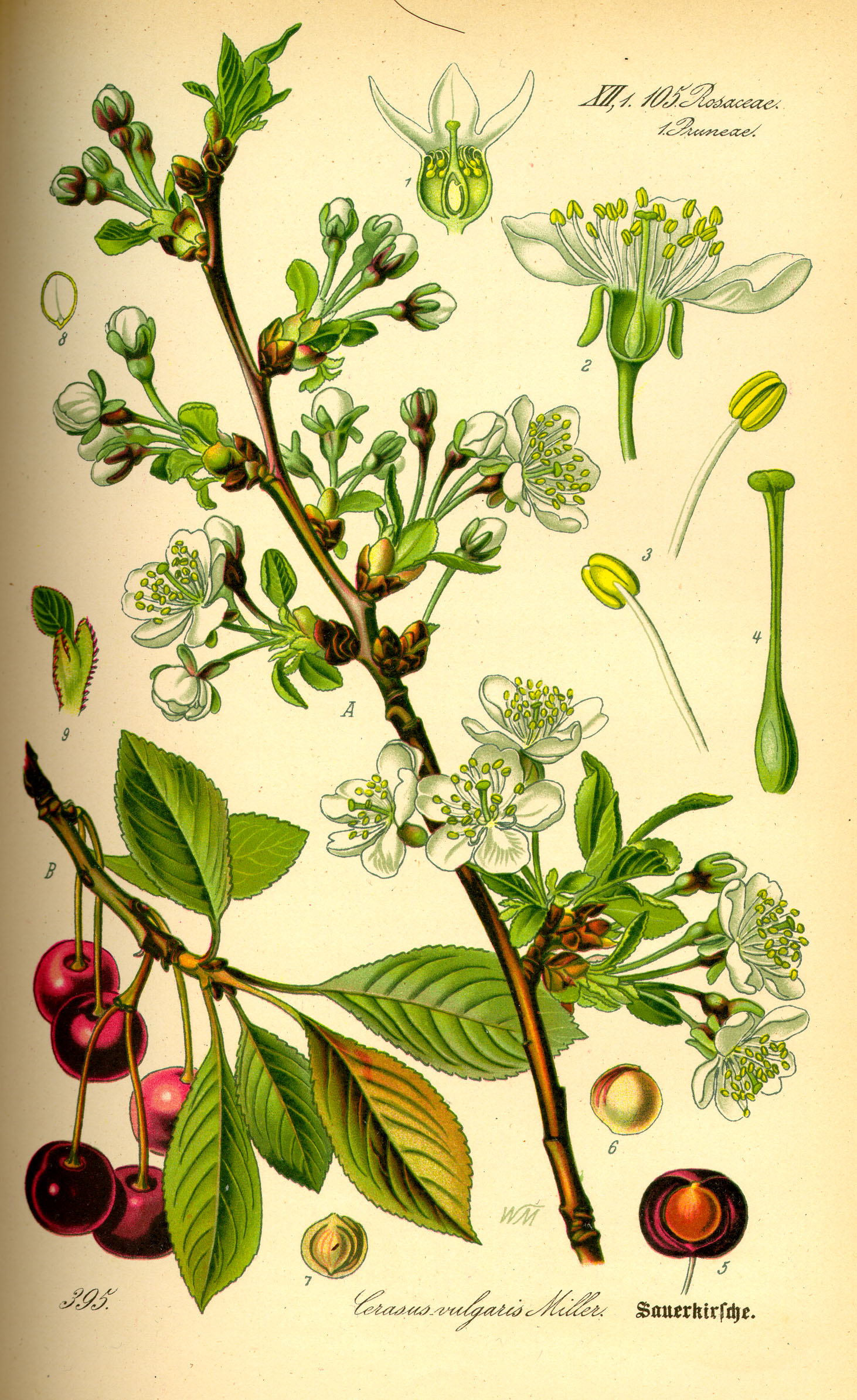
Illustration of the sour cherry

Because morellos were originally grown in the Black Forest regions of Germany, kirschwasser is believed to have originated there. Kirschwasser is colourless because it is either not aged in wood or was aged in barrels made of ash. It may have been aged in paraffin-lined wood barrels or earthenware vessels. Rivals in producing high quality "Kirsch" is Switzerland and Alsace; the latter even has a kirschwasser route, and other quality cherry-production, German-speaking areas like South Tyrolia.

In France and English-speaking countries, clear fruit brandies are known as eaux de vie. The European Union sets a minimum of 37.5% ABV (75 proof) for products of this kind; kirschwasser typically has an alcohol content of 40%–50% ABV (80–100 proof). About 10 kilograms (22 pounds) of cherries go into the making of a 750 ml bottle of kirschwasser.

One French variety, Kirsch de Fougerolles, and two Swiss varieties, Zuger Kirsch and Rigi Kirsch, have been certified as appellation d'origine protégée (AOP).

== Chemical composition ==
Compared with brandy or whisky, the characteristic features of kirsch are that it contains relatively large quantities of higher alcohols and compound ethers, and the presence in this spirit of small quantities of hydrogen cyanide, partly as such and partly in combination as benzaldehyde-cyanohydrin, to which the distinctive flavour of kirsch is largely due.

== Food ==
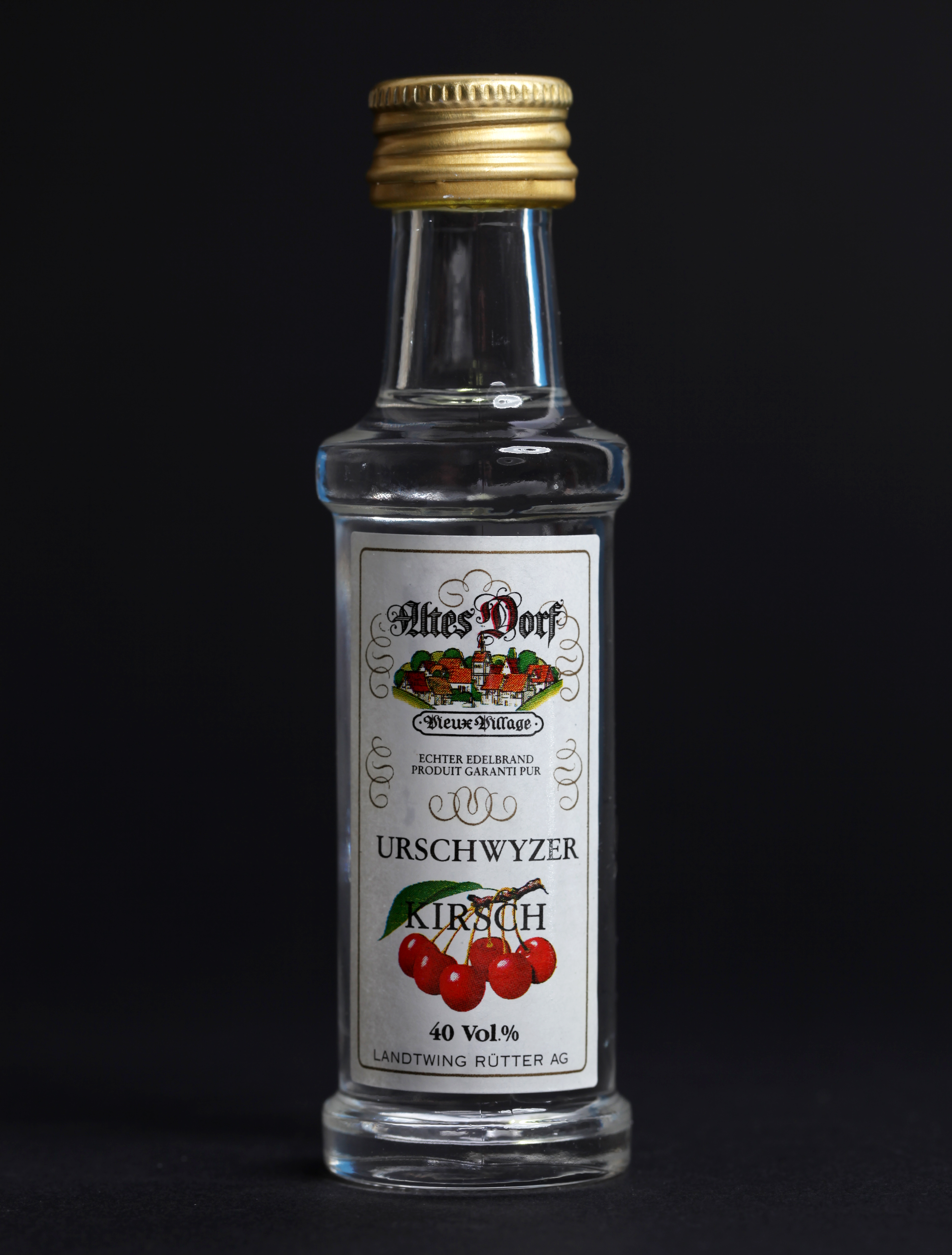
Urschwyzer kirsch, produced in Switzerland and bottled at 40% ABV

Kirsch is used in some cakes, notably traditional German Schwarzwälder Kirschtorte (Black Forest gateau), Gugelhupf and Zuger Kirschtorte.

It is also sometimes used in Swiss fondue and the dessert, cherries jubilee.

Kirsch can also be used as a filling of chocolates. A typical kirsch chocolate consists of no more than one milliliter of kirsch, surrounded by milk or (more usually) dark chocolate with a film of hard sugar between the two parts, which acts as an impermeable casing for the liquid content and compensates for the lack of sweetness typical of kirsch. Manufacturers include Swiss chocolatiers Lindt & Sprüngli and Camille Bloch.

== See also ==
- Culinary Heritage of Switzerland
- Fruit brandy
- Himbeergeist
- Schnapps
