= Fruit Ridge (Michigan) =

- Nickname: The Ridge
- Location in Michigan
- Coordinates: 43.11808°N 85.76921°W
- Country: United States
- State: Michigan
- Counties: Kent

Area
  - Total: 158 sq mi (410 km^{2})

Fruit Ridge (also known as The Ridge) is a topographical land feature and growing region in West Michigan. The area is so named for its extensive agricultural activity, specifically because of its fruit production.

== Agriculture ==
Its characteristics make it a fruit-growing region. The area's deposits of fertile clay loam soils with moisture holding qualities, elevation of greater than 800 feet (240 m), and its proximity to Lake Michigan create a climate and provide soil and terrain for the growing of fruits and vegetables.

The Ridge is well known for apple production; in 2006 the area accounted for 65% of all Michigan apple production.

== Geography ==
The Ridge is approximately 8 miles (13 km) wide and 20 miles (32 km) long covering 158 square miles (410 km^{2}) in portions of Kent, Newaygo, Muskegon, and Ottawa counties. It extends from Walker in the south; to Grant in the North, and is primarily centered on Sparta, the location of the Old Orchard Juice Company. Fruit Ridge Avenue was named after it.

== Renewable energy ==
In addition to agricultural practices, Fruit Ridge is also becoming an area of interest for the construction of commercial wind farms. Iberdrola Renewables of Spain has installed a tower of nearly 200 feet (61 m) on the ridge to test whether the wind is strong enough to produce a steady flow of electricity. Company officials hope to build 30 to 35 towers in the area. The Ridge is an area of interest because of the availability of straight line winds, existing high-voltage transmission lines, and farmers eager to preserve agriculture on the ridge. Heritage Sustainable Energy of Traverse City has also been securing wind rights leases in the Fruit Ridge Area. It is estimated that landowners will receive from $3,000 to $5,000 per year per megawatt.

== Pesticide Environmental Stewardship Program ==
In 2005, International baby food manufacturer Gerber Products Company as well as Pacific Biocontrol, and Michigan State University all were working with area apple packers to develop a region-wide codling moth mating disruption program. This pest, which has been a major apple pest for many years, is developing documented resistance to the organophosphate insecticides.

== See also ==
- Fruit Belt
