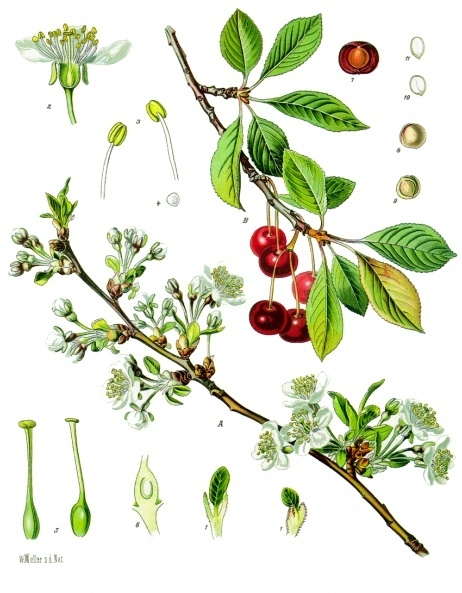
- 1897 illustration

Scientific classification
- Kingdom: Plantae
- Clade: Embryophytes
- Clade: Tracheophytes
- Clade: Angiosperms
- Clade: Eudicots
- Clade: Rosids
- Order: Rosales
- Family: Rosaceae
- Genus: Prunus
- Subgenus: Prunus subg. Cerasus
- Species: P. cerasus

Binomial name
- Prunus cerasus L. 1753

Synonyms
- List: Cerasus acida (Ehrh.) Borkh.; Cerasus austera (L.) Borkh.; Cerasus austera (L.) M.Roem.; Cerasus collina Lej. & Courtois; Cerasus fruticosa Pall.; Cerasus vulgaris Mill.; Druparia cerasus (L.) Clairv.; Prunus acida Ehrh.; Prunus aestiva Salisb.; Prunus austera (L.) Ehrh.; Prunus caproniana (L.) Gaudin; Prunus recta (Liegel) K.Koch; Prunus semperflorens Ehrh.

= Prunus cerasus =

Species of cherry tree

Prunus cerasus (sour cherry, tart cherry, or dwarf cherry) is an Old World species of Prunus in the subgenus Cerasus (cherries). It has two main groups of cultivars: the dark-red Morello cherry and the lighter-red Amarelle cherry. The sour pulp is edible.

== Description ==
The tree is smaller than the sweet cherry (growing to a height of 4–10 m), has twiggy branches, and its crimson-to-near-black cherries are borne upon shorter stalks.

It is closely related to the sweet cherry (Prunus avium), but has a fruit that is more acidic.

Its fruit persists for an average of 17.4 days, and always bears 1 seed per fruit. Fruits average 84.9% water, and their dry weight includes 39.7% carbohydrates and 1.0% lipids.

== Taxonomy ==
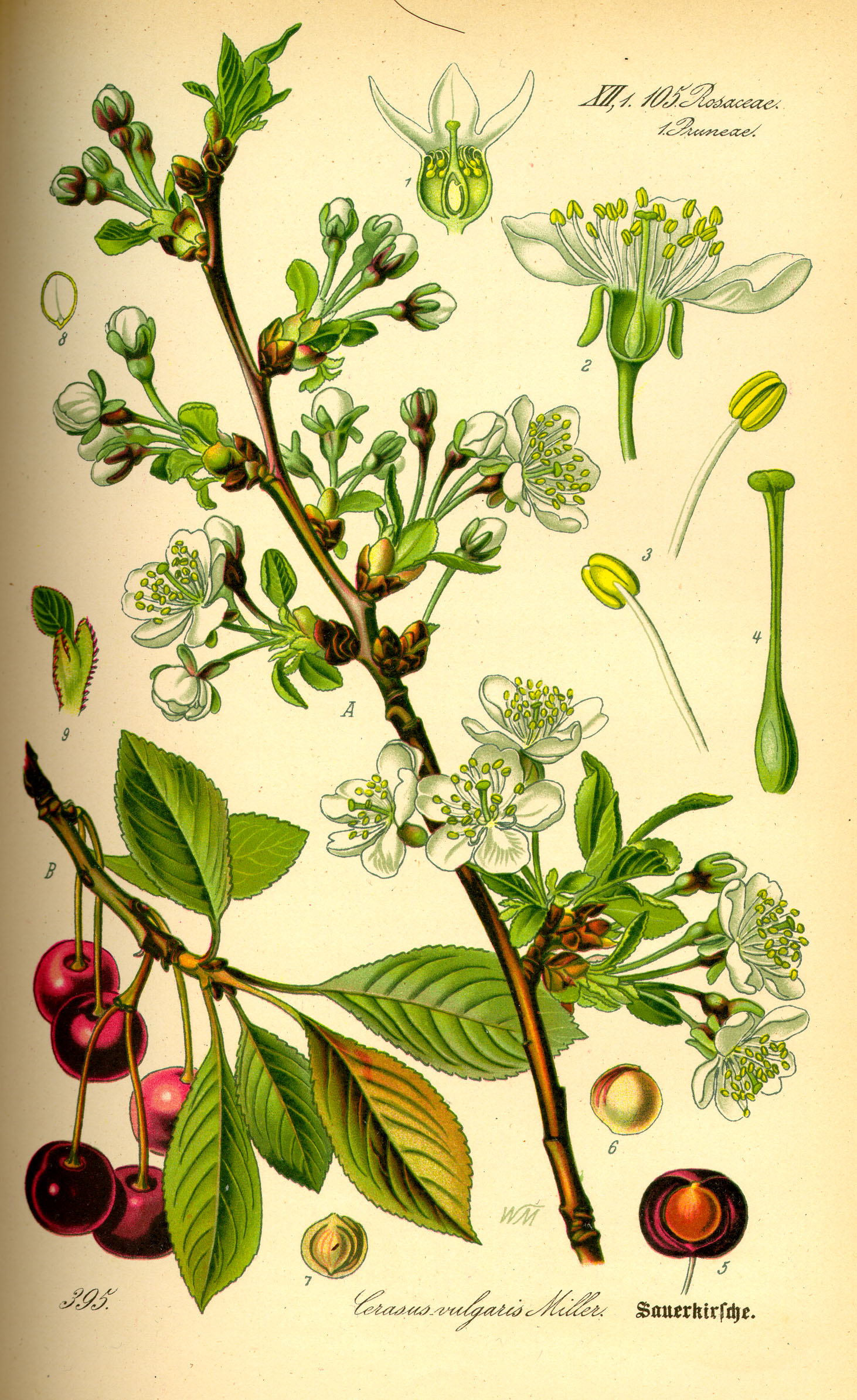
Illustration of Morello cherry

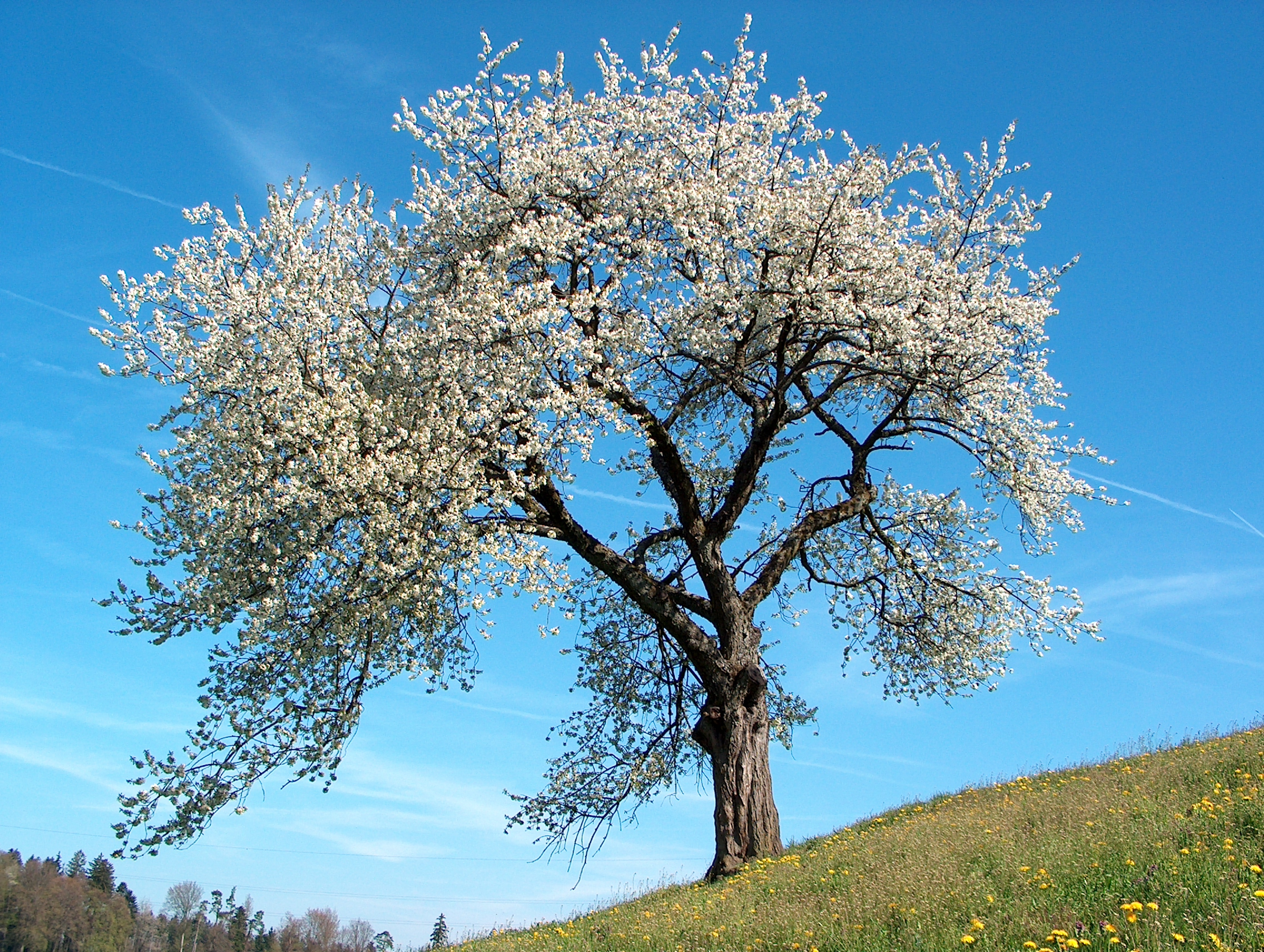
A blooming sour cherry tree

Prunus cerasus, a tetraploid with 2n=32 chromosomes, is thought to have originated as a natural hybrid between Prunus avium and Prunus fruticosa in the Iranian Plateau or Eastern Europe where the two species come into contact. Prunus fruticosa is believed to have provided its smaller size and sour tasting fruit. The hybrids then stabilized and interbred to form a new, distinct species.

There are two main varieties (groups of cultivars) of the sour cherry: the dark-red Morello cherry and the lighter-red Amarelle cherry.

== Distribution and habitat ==
It is distributed in much of Europe, North Africa and West Asia. There are likely no truly wild occurrences. However, particularly the subspecies acida easily escapes cultivation and is naturalized throughout the growing area.

== Cultivation ==
Cultivated sour cherries were selected from wild specimens of Prunus cerasus from around the Caspian and Black Seas, and were known to the Greeks in 300 BC. They were also used by Persians and the Romans who introduced them into Britain long before the 1st century AD.

As early as the 12th century, a Morello type sour cherry was grown in the Schaerbeek region of Belgium. Schaerbeek cherries were devastated by the Napoleonic and World Wars. Today there are efforts to reestablish Schaerbeek sour cherries, a defining component of Kriek lambic beer culture in Belgium recognized by UNESCO in 2016 as an "Intangible Cultural Heritage of Humanity." Although a "Morello type," Schaerbeek cherries are distinctive in that they are ovate on the horizontal axis, a deeper burgundy color when ripe, have a lower chill requirement to set fruit, and have a distinctive cinnamon aroma and flavor.

In England, sour cherry cultivation was popularized in the 16th century in the time of Henry VIII. They became a common crop amongst Kentish growers, and by 1640 over two dozen named cultivars were recorded.

Before the Second World War there were more than fifty cultivars of sour cherry in cultivation in England; today, however, few are grown commercially, and despite the continuation of named cultivars such as 'Kentish Red', 'Amarelles', 'Griottes' and 'Flemish', only the generic Morello is offered by most nurseries. This is a late-flowering variety, and thus misses more frosts than its sweet counterpart and is therefore a more reliable cropper. The Morello cherry ripens in mid- to late summer, toward the end of August in southern England. It is self-fertile, and would be a good pollenizer for other varieties if it did not flower so late in the season.

Sour cherries require similar cultivation conditions to pears, that is, they prefer a rich, well-drained, moist soil, although they demand more nitrogen and water than sweet cherries. Trees will do badly if waterlogged, but have greater tolerance of poor drainage than sweet varieties. As with sweet cherries, Morellos are traditionally cultivated by budding onto strong growing rootstocks, which produce trees too large for most gardens, although newer dwarfing rootstocks such as Colt and Gisella are now available. During spring, flowers should be protected, and trees weeded, mulched and sprayed with natural seaweed solution. This is also the time when any required pruning should be carried out (note that cherries should not be pruned during the dormant winter months). Morello cherry trees fruit on younger wood than sweet varieties, and thus can be pruned harder. They are usually grown as standards, but can be fan trained, cropping well even on cold walls, or grown as low bushes.

Sour cherries suffer fewer pests and diseases than sweet cherries, although they are prone to heavy fruit losses from birds. In summer, fruit should be protected with netting. When harvesting fruit, they should be cut from the tree rather than risking damage by pulling the stalks.

Unlike most sweet cherry varieties, sour cherries are self-fertile or self-pollenizing. Two implications of this are that seeds generally run true to the cultivar, and that much smaller pollinator populations are needed because pollen only has to be moved within individual flowers. In areas where pollinators are scarce, growers find that stocking beehives in orchards improves yields.

Sour cherry production 2022, in tonnes
Russia	297,200
Poland	183,800
Ukraine	180,240
Turkey	176,770
Serbia	164,446
Iran	134,055
United States	110,770
World	1,593,025

== Production ==
In 2022, world production of sour cherries was 1.6 million tonnes, led by Russia with 19% of the total. Other major producers were Poland, Ukraine, and Turkey.

== Uses ==
=== Culinary ===
The sour pulp is edible. Dried sour cherries are used in cooking including soups, pork dishes, cakes, tarts, and pies. They are also used to make a jam/fruit spread.

Sour cherries are particularly common in Turkey, especially in the form of vişne suyu (sour cherry nectar), a widely consumed beverage, and vişne reçeli (sour cherry jam), often eaten as part of a traditional breakfast or mixed into plain yoghurt.

Sour cherries or sour cherry syrup are used in liqueurs and drinks, such as the Romanian vișinată or the Portuguese ginjinha. In Iran, Turkey, Greece and Cyprus, sour cherries are prized for making spoon sweets by slowly boiling pitted sour cherries and sugar; the syrup thereof is used for sharbat-e Albalou, vişne şurubu or vyssináda, a beverage made by diluting the syrup with ice-cold water. A particular use of sour cherries is in the production of kriek lambic, a cherry-flavored variety of a naturally fermented beer made in Belgium. In Germany and Austria, sour cherries are used for desserts such as the donauwelle. Cherry bounce is made by infusing sour cherries in old French brandy.

== Gallery ==
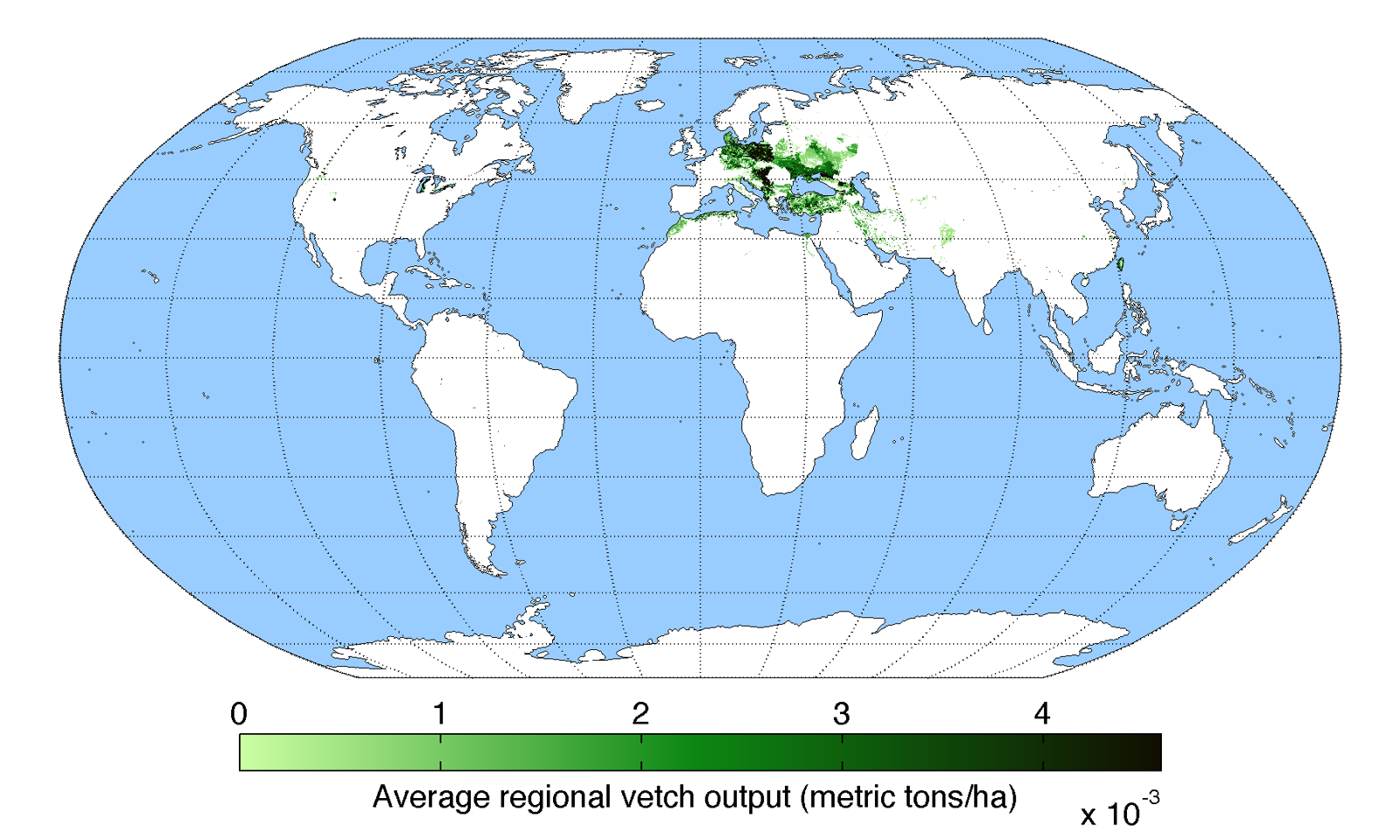
Worldwide sour cherry production, 2024

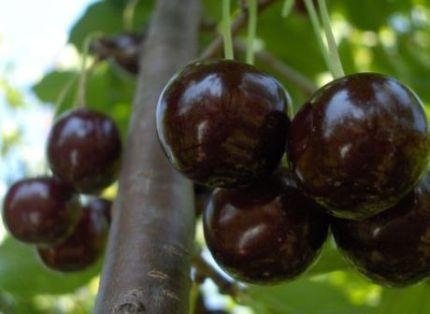
Ripe sour cherries, Hungary

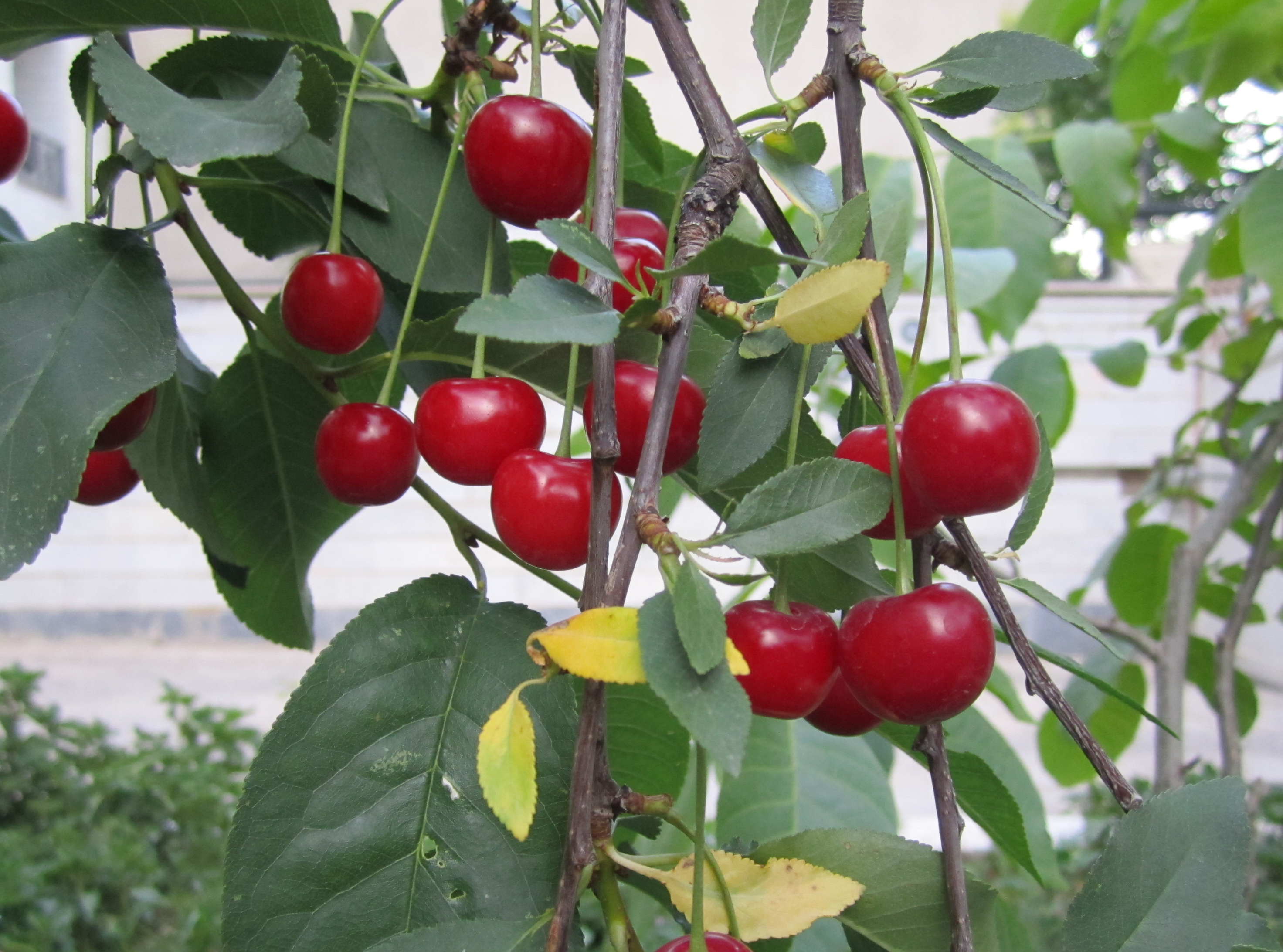
Ripe sour cherries and their leaves, Iran

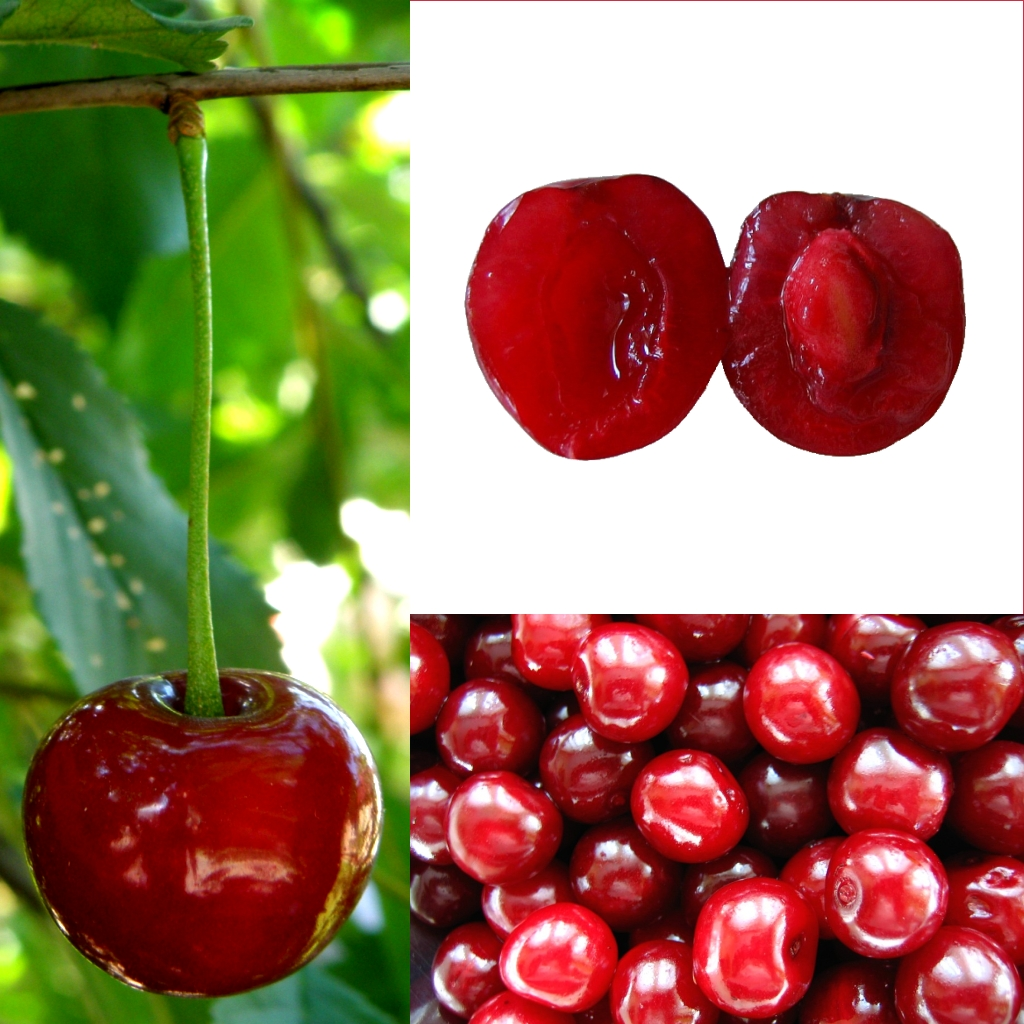
Sour cherries

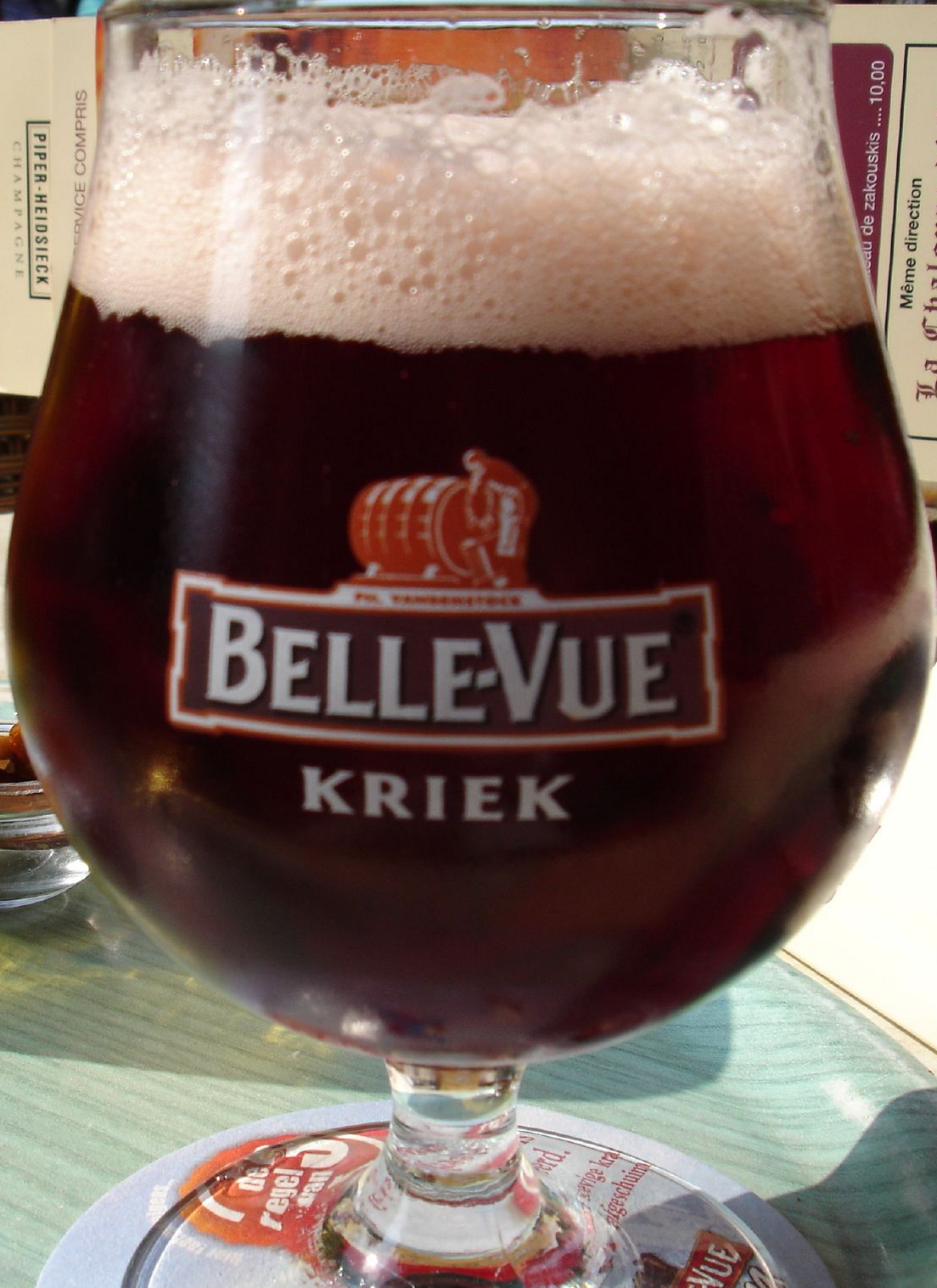
Kriek lambic is infused with sour cherries.

== Cultivars ==
Some notable cultivars are:

- Morello
- Ostheim cherry
- Stevnsbær
- Pándy meggy
- Amarena cherry (Prunus cerasus var. amarena)
- Marasca cherry (Prunus cerasus var. marasca)
- Griotte de Kleparow
- Balaton cherry
- Montmorency cherry
- North Star cherry, a dwarf variety

For commercial production, "Morello" is the main cultivar grown in Central Europe, while the "Montmorency" variety is the most common in the US. Kütahya is the most important in Turkey, Oblačinska in Serbia.

== See also ==
- Fruit tree propagation
- Ginjinha, a Portuguese liqueur made from sour cherries
- Kirsch
- Kriek, a traditional Belgian beer made with sour cherries
- Pruning fruit trees
- Sour cherry soup
- Syzygium corynanthum, an Australian rainforest tree also known as the sour cherry
- Vișinată, a Romanian liqueur made with sour cherries (vișina in Romanian)

== Bibliography ==
- Ehrlén, Johan; Eriksson, Ove (1991). "Phenological variation in fruit characteristics in vertebrate-dispersed plants". Oecologia. 86 (4): 463–470. doi:10.1007/BF00318311. ISSN 0029-8549.
