= Cherry ice cream =

Ice cream flavor

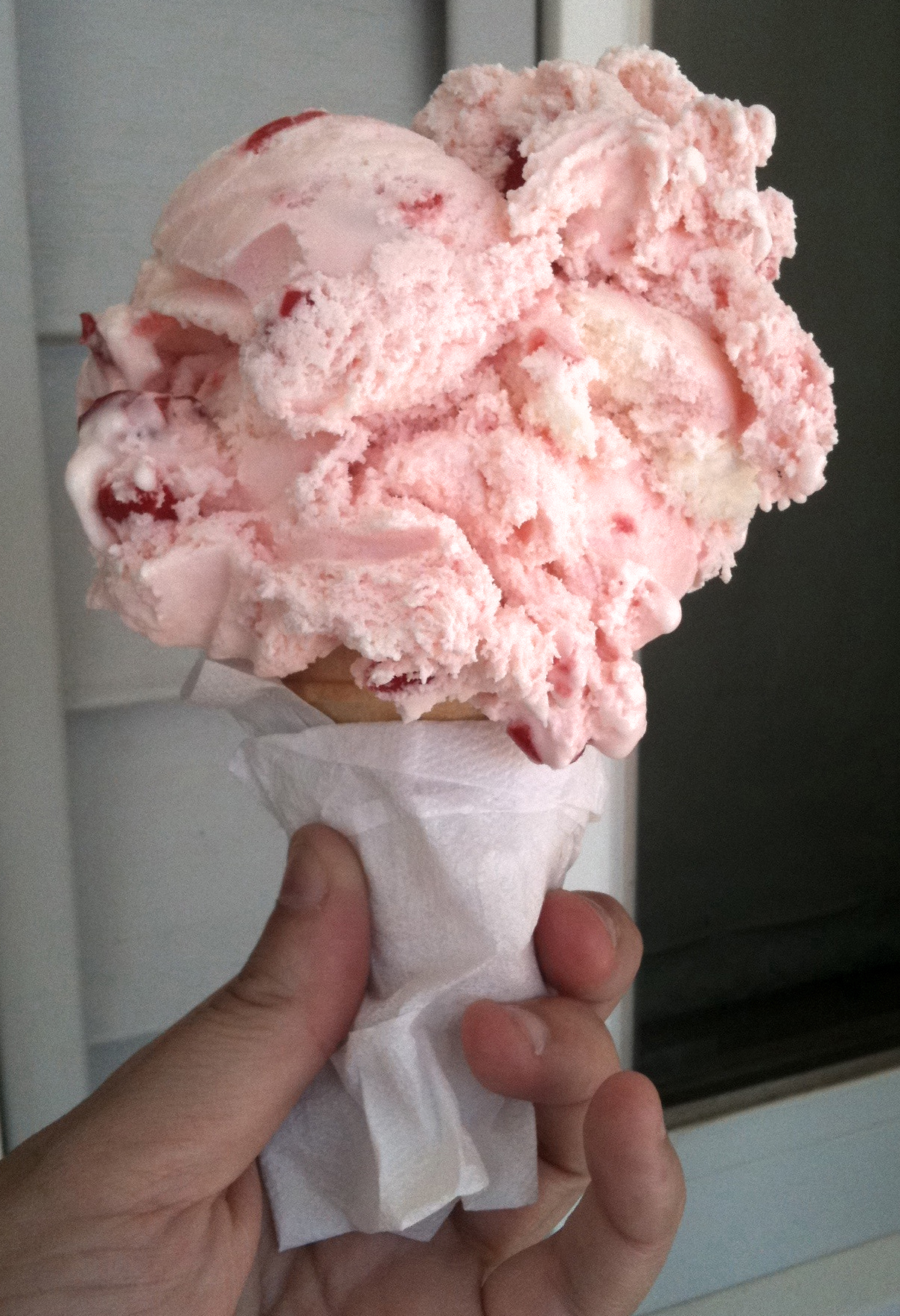
- A cherry ice cream cone
- Type: Ice cream
- Course: Dessert
- Serving temperature: Frozen
- Main ingredients: Cherries, milk, cream, sugar

Cherry ice cream is a common ice cream flavor, prepared using typical ice cream ingredients and cherries. Various types of cherries and cherry cultivars are used. In the United States, where the flavor is especially popular, it has been mass-produced since at least 1917.

== Overview ==
Cherry ice cream is a common ice cream flavor in the United States consisting of typical ice cream ingredients and cherries. Whole or sliced or chopped cherries are used, and cherry juice or cherry juice concentrate is sometimes used as an ingredient. Cherry extract and cherry pit oil have also been used as ingredients. Various cherry cultivars are used, such as black cherries, bing cherries and sour cherry cultivars. Maraschino cherries are also used. In the 20th century, White House Cherry ice cream, consisting of vanilla ice cream with Maraschino cherries, was a popular flavor in some parts of the U.S. . Cherry gelato has also been produced, and the dish can be prepared as a soft serve ice cream. Chocolate is sometimes used as an ingredient in cherry ice cream.

== History ==
André Viard in Le Cuisinier Impérial, first published in 1806, gives a recipe for glace de cerises. Cherry ice cream has been produced in the United States since at least 1892. A version of the dish created in 1932 included bitter almond extract, which is used as an additive on sour cherries, and was described as providing the flavor of maraschino cherry to the sour cherries.

It has become a tradition for cherry ice cream to be served at the International Cherry Blossom Festival in Macon, Georgia.

== Mass production ==
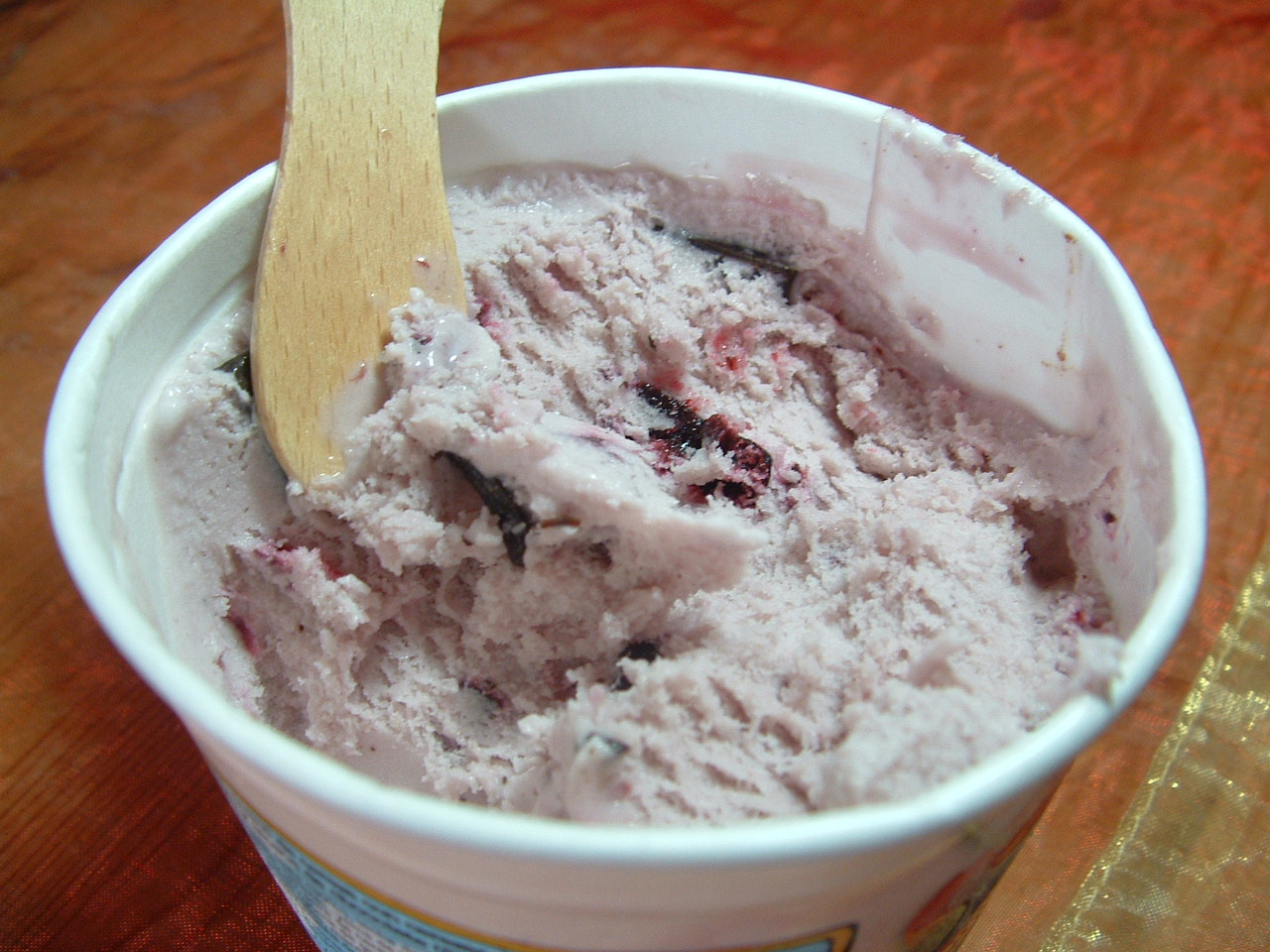
Ben & Jerry's Cherry Garcia ice cream

Cherry ice cream has been mass-produced in the United States since at least 1917.

== See also ==
- List of cherry dishes
- List of ice cream flavors
