= Cherry =

Fruit of some plants of the genus Prunus

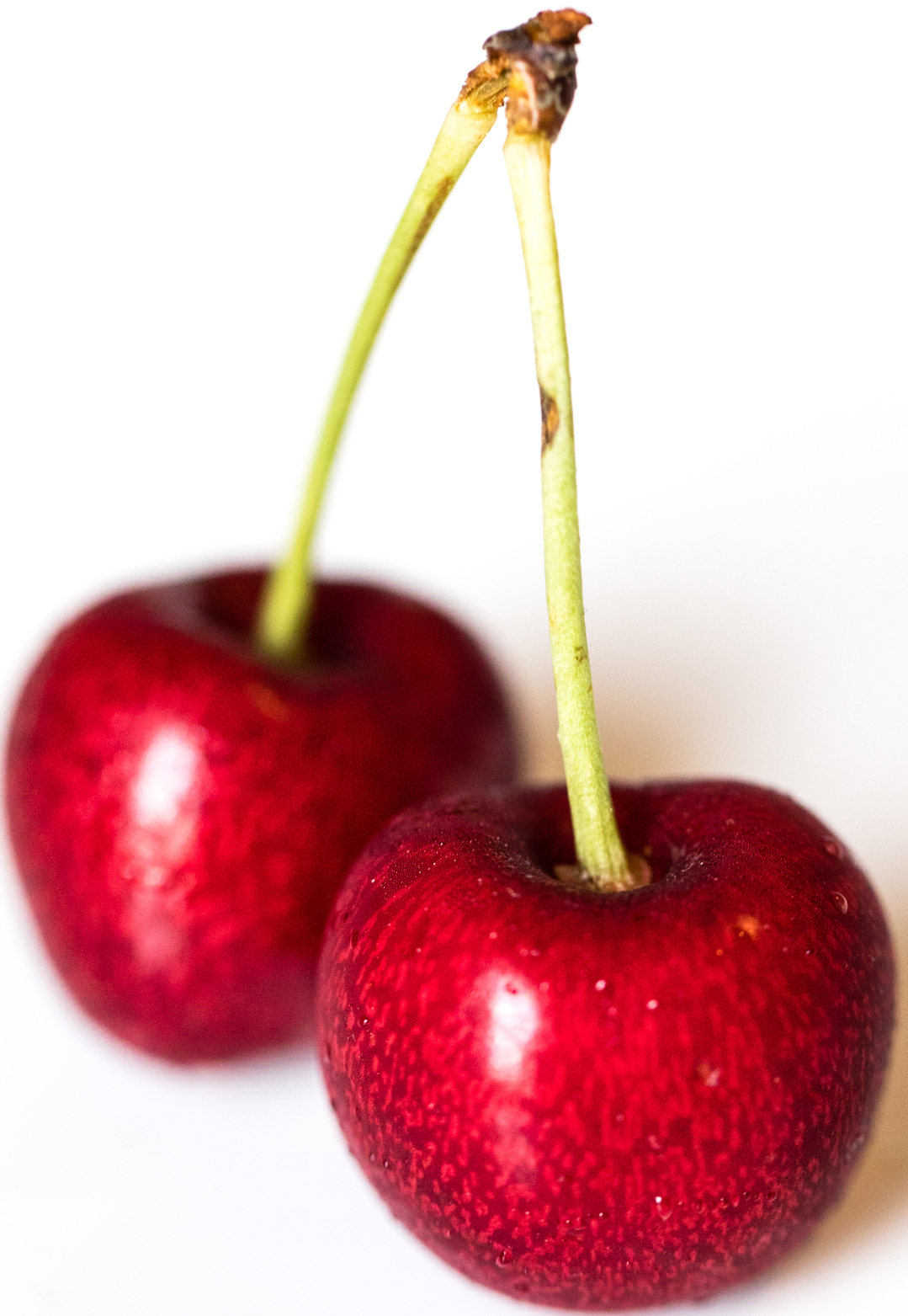
Red cherries with stems

A cherry is the fruit of many plants of the genus Prunus, and is a fleshy drupe (stone fruit).

Commercial cherries are obtained from cultivars of several species, such as the sweet Prunus avium and the sour Prunus cerasus. The tree, its flowers, and its wood are all called by the same name, as in "ornamental cherry" or "cherry blossom". Wild cherry can be any of the cherry species growing outside cultivation, although Prunus avium is often specifically called "wild cherry" in the British Isles.

== Botany ==
=== True cherries ===
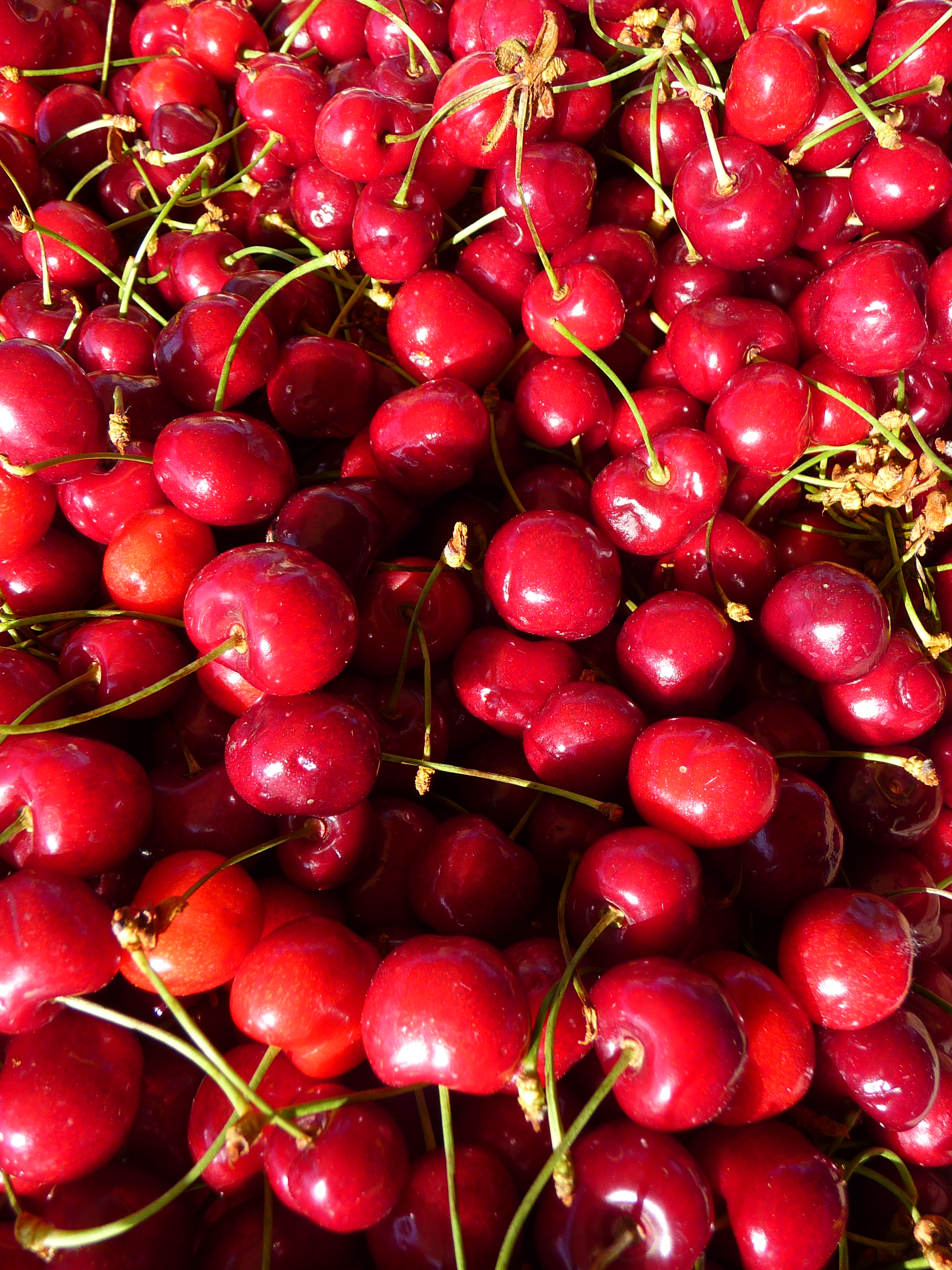
Prunus avium, sweet cherry

Prunus subg. Cerasus contains species that are typically called cherries. They are known as true cherries and distinguished by having a single winter bud per axil, by having the flowers in small corymbs or umbels of several together (occasionally solitary, e.g. P. serrula; some species with short racemes, e.g. P. maacki), and by having smooth fruit with no obvious groove.

=== Bush cherries ===
Bush cherries are characterized by having three winter buds per axil. They used to be included in Prunus subg. Cerasus, but phylogenetic research indicates they should be a section of Prunus subg. Prunus.

=== Bird cherries, cherry laurels, and other racemose cherries ===
Prunus subg. Padus contains most racemose species that are called cherries which used to be included in the genera Padus (bird cherries), Laurocerasus (cherry laurels), Pygeum (tropical species such as African cherry) and Maddenia.

== Etymology ==
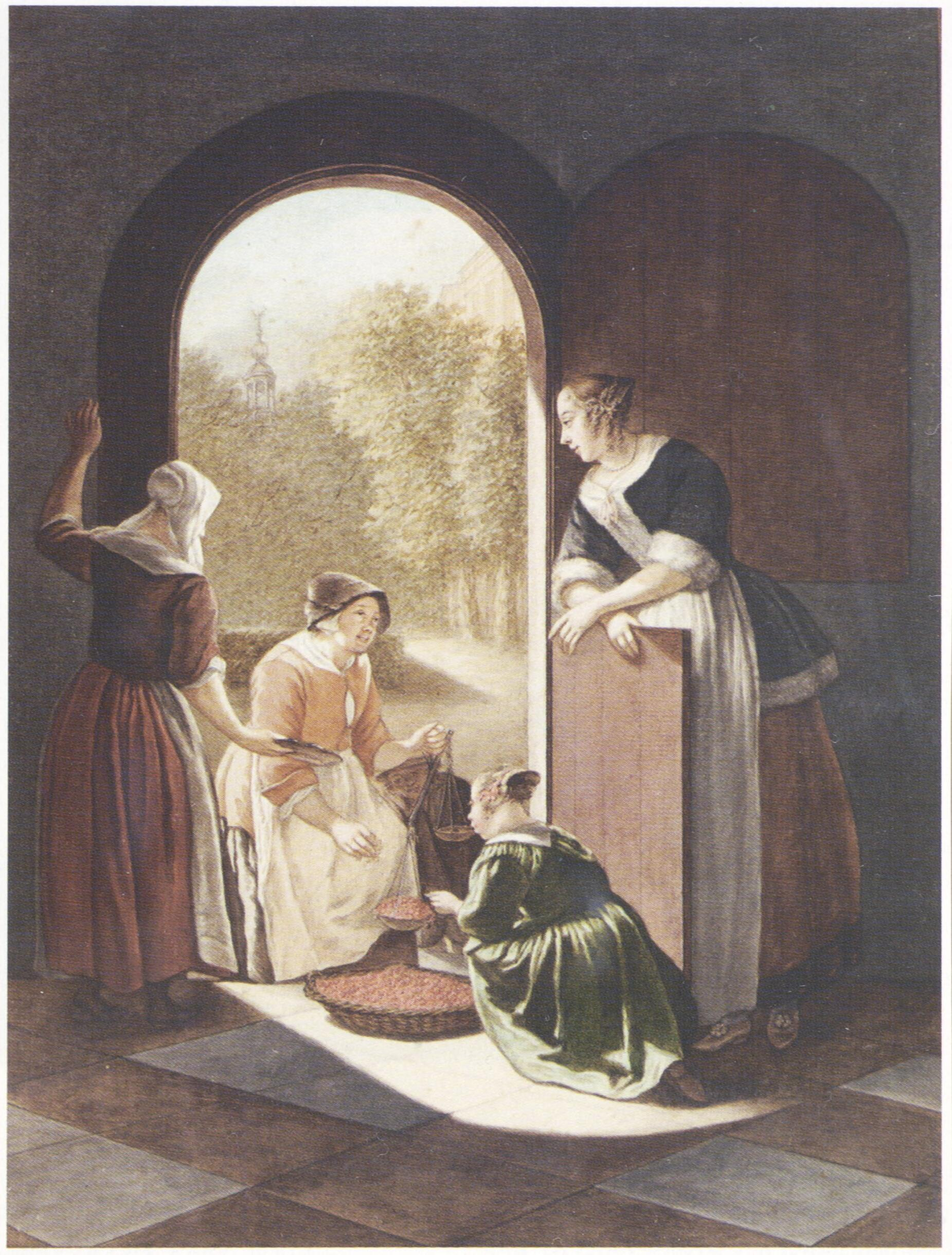
The Cherry Seller by Sara Troost (Netherlands, 18th century)

The English word cherry derives from Old Northern French or Norman cherise from the Latin cerasum, referring to an ancient Greek region, Kerasous (Κερασοῦς) near Giresun, Turkey, from which cherries were first thought to be exported to Europe.

The word "cherry" is also used for some species that bear fruits with similar size and shape even though they are not in the same Prunus genus; some of these species include the "Jamaican cherry" (Muntingia calabura) and the "Spanish cherry" (Mimusops elengi).

== Antiquity ==
The indigenous range of the sweet cherry extends through most of Europe, western Asia, and parts of northern Africa, and the fruit has been consumed throughout its range since prehistoric times. A cultivated cherry is recorded as having been brought to Rome by Lucius Licinius Lucullus from northeastern Anatolia, also known as the Pontus region, in 72 BCE.

Cherries were introduced into England at Teynham, near Sittingbourne in Kent, by order of Henry VIII, who had tasted them in Flanders.

Cherries, along with many other fruiting trees and plants, probably first arrived in North America around 1606 in the New France colony of Port Royal, which is modern-day Annapolis Royal, Nova Scotia. Richard Guthrie described in 1629, the "fruitful valley adorned with...great variety of fruit trees, chestnuts, pears, apples, cherries, plums and all other fruits."

== Cultivation ==
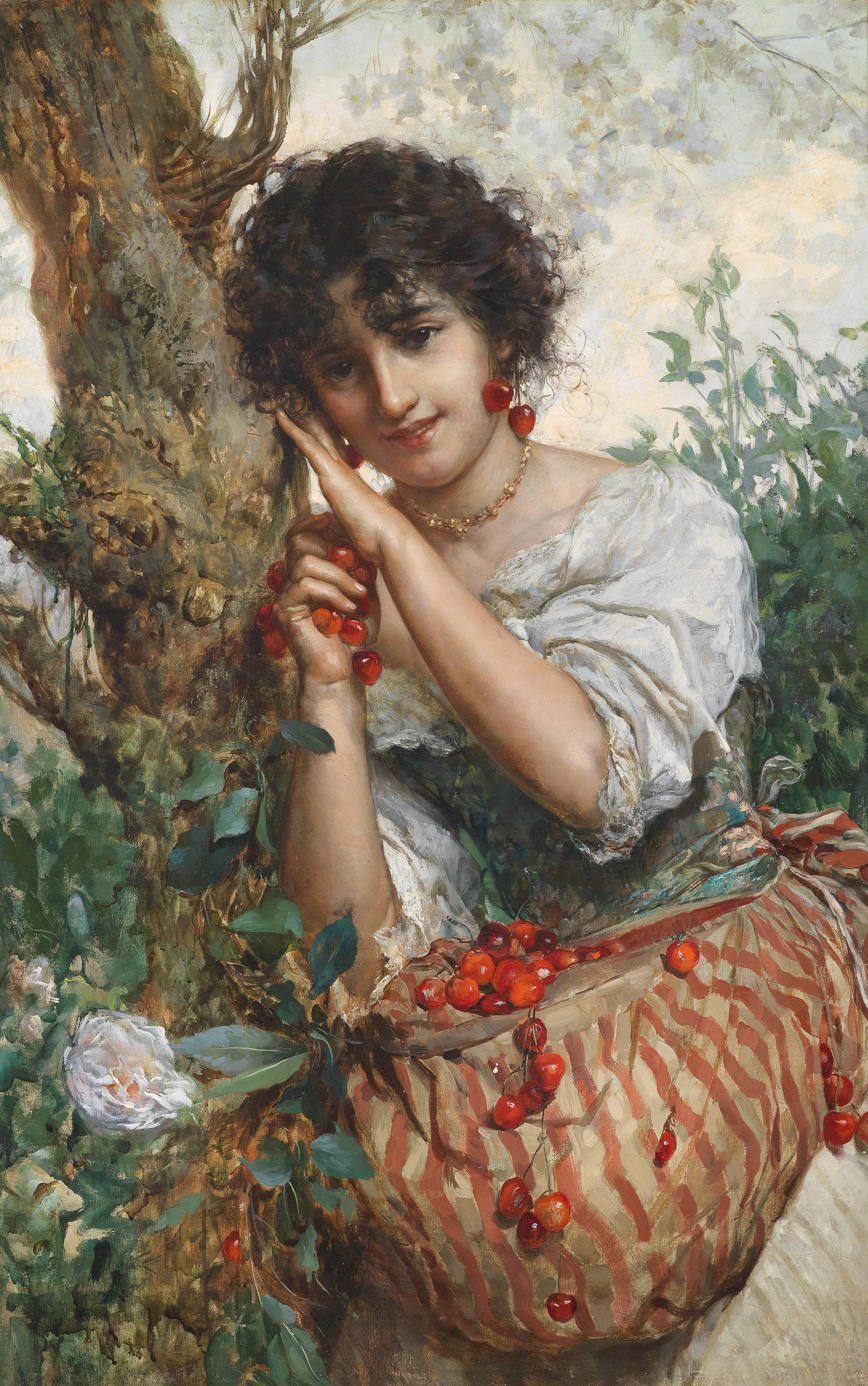
Cherry time by Salvatore Postiglione

The most common cherry species in cultivation is sweet cherry (P. avium) to which most cherry cultivars belong. The sour cherry (P. cerasus) is also cultivated, mainly for cooking. Both species originate in Europe and western Asia; they usually do not cross-pollinate. In East Asia, Chinese cherry (P. pseudocerasus) and downy cherry (P. tomentosa) have been cultivated for thousands of years for their sweet fruits.

Irrigation, spraying, labor, and their propensity to damage from rain and hail make cherries relatively expensive. Nonetheless, demand is high for the fruit. In commercial production, sour cherries, as well as sweet cherries sometimes, are harvested by using a mechanized "shaker." Hand picking is also widely used for sweet as well as sour cherries to harvest the fruit to avoid damage to both fruit and trees.

Common rootstocks include Mazzard, Mahaleb, Colt, and Gisela Series, a dwarfing rootstock that produces trees significantly smaller than others, only 8 to 10 feet (2.5 to 3 meters) tall. Sour cherries require no pollenizer, while few sweet varieties are self-fertile.

A cherry tree will take three to four years once it is planted in the orchard to produce its first crop of fruit, and seven years to attain full maturity.

Production of cherries

Cherry yield

=== Growing season ===
Like most temperate-latitude trees, cherry trees require a certain number of chilling hours each year to break dormancy and bloom and produce fruit. The number of chilling hours required depends on the variety. Because of this cold-weather requirement, no members of the genus Prunus can grow in tropical climates. (See "production" section for more information on chilling requirements)

Cherries have a short growing season and can grow in most temperate latitudes. Cherries blossom in April (in the Northern Hemisphere) and the peak season for the cherry harvest is in the summer. In southern Europe in June, in North America in June, in England in mid-July, and in southern British Columbia (Canada) in June to mid-August. In many parts of North America, they are among the first tree fruits to flower and ripen in mid-Spring.

In the Southern Hemisphere, cherries are usually at their peak in late December and are widely associated with Christmas. 'Burlat' is an early variety which ripens during the beginning of December, 'Lapins' ripens near the end of December, and 'Sweetheart' finish slightly later.

=== Pests and diseases ===
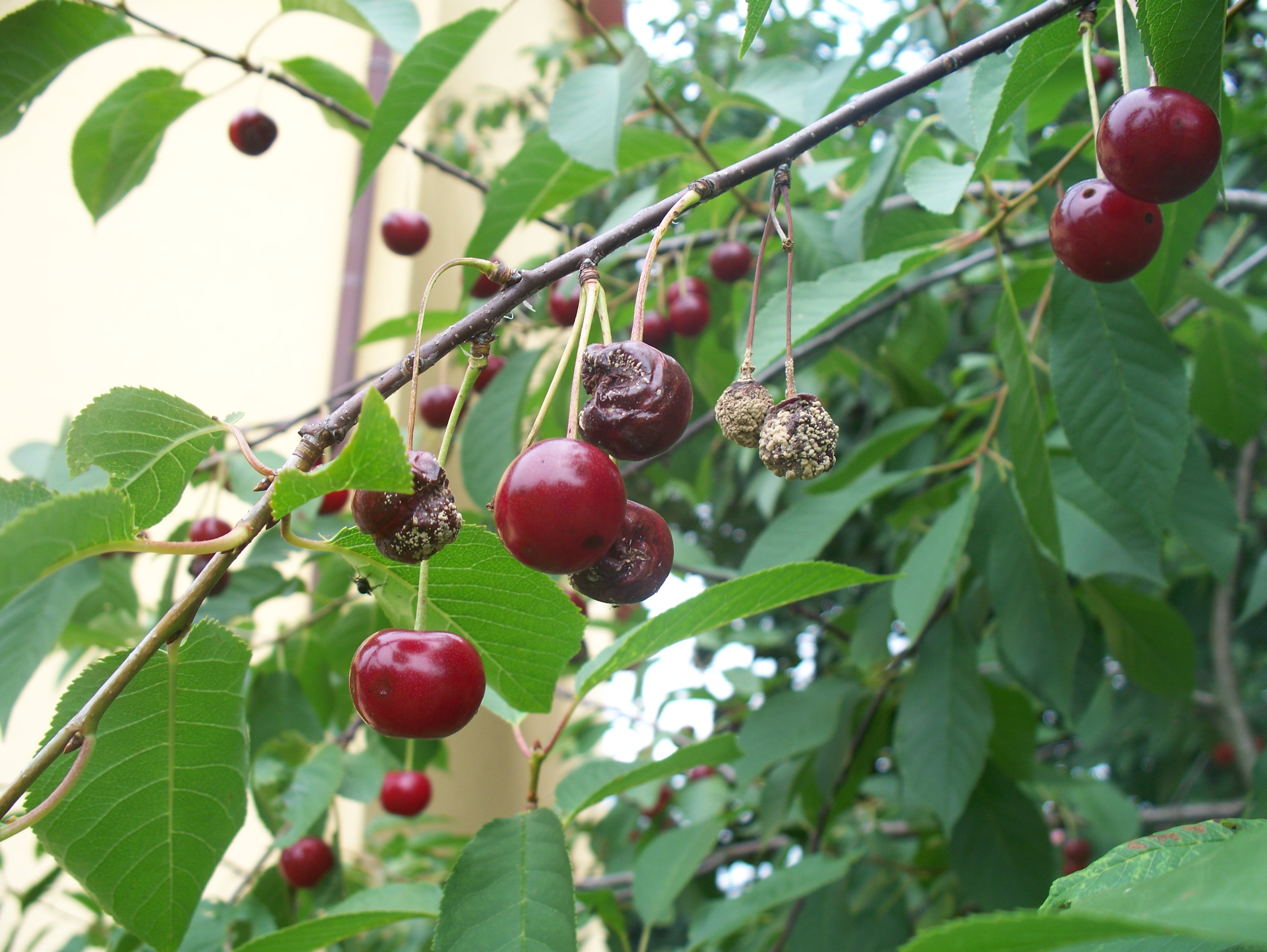
Cherries with Monilinia laxa

Generally, the cherry can be a difficult fruit tree to grow and keep alive. In Europe, the first visible pest in the growing season soon after blossom (in April in western Europe) usually is the black cherry aphid ("cherry blackfly," Myzus cerasi), which causes leaves at the tips of branches to curl, with the blackfly colonies exuding a sticky secretion which promotes fungal growth on the leaves and fruit. At the fruiting stage in June/July (Europe), the cherry fruit fly (Rhagoletis cingulata and Rhagoletis cerasi) lays its eggs in the immature fruit, whereafter its larvae feed on the cherry flesh and exit through a small hole (about 1 mm diameter), which in turn is the entry point for fungal infection of the cherry fruit after rainfall. In addition, cherry trees are susceptible to bacterial canker, cytospora canker, brown rot of the fruit, root rot from overly wet soil, crown rot, and several viruses.

== Cultivars ==
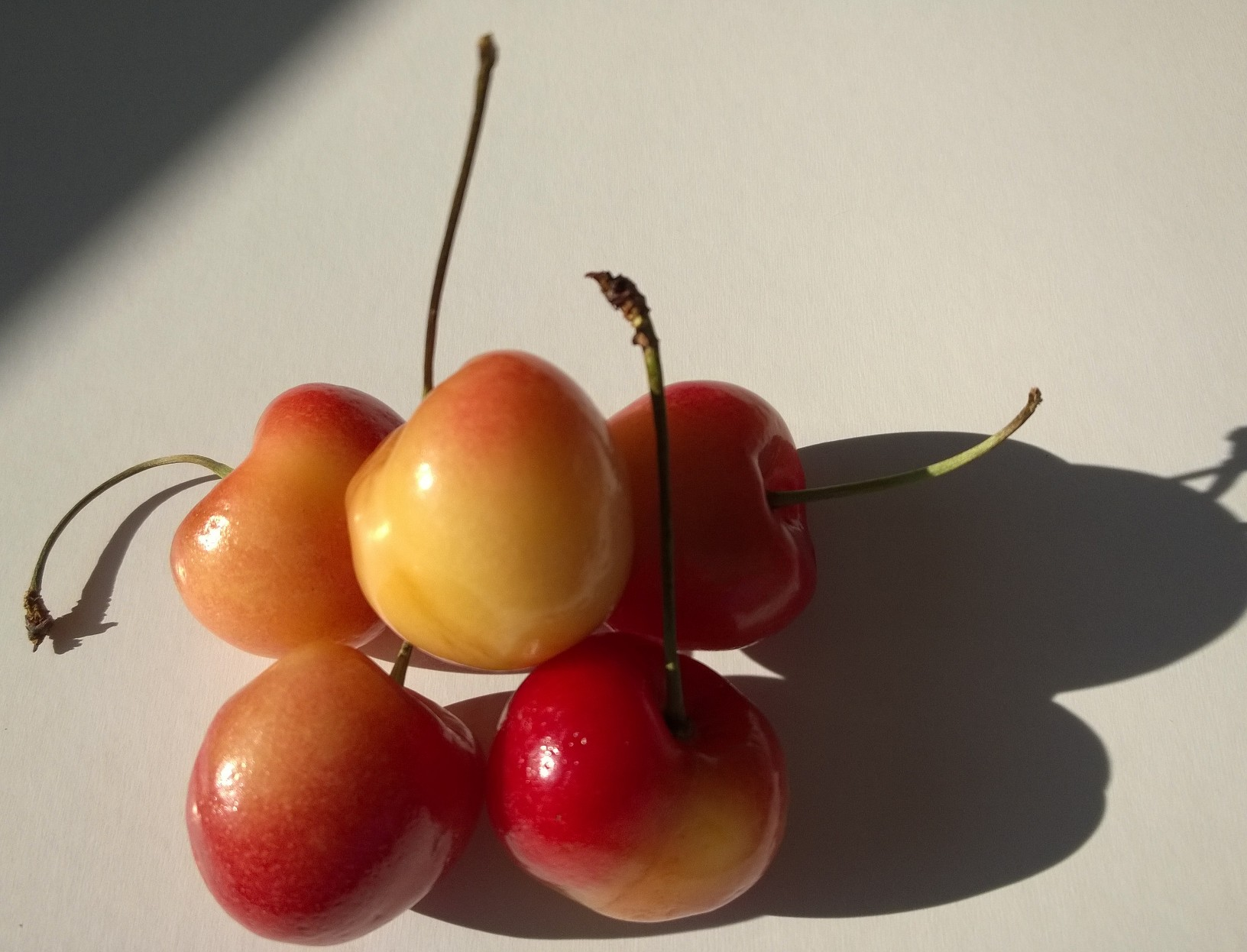
Rainier cherries from the state of Washington, US

The following cultivars have gained the Royal Horticultural Society's Award of Garden Merit:

Name	Height m	Spread m	Ref.
Accolade	8	8	
Amanogawa	8	4	
Autumnalis (P. × subhirtella)	8	8	
Autumnalis Rosea (P. × subhirtella)	8	4	
Avium Grandiflora (see Plena)			
Colorata (P. padus)	12	8	
Grandiflora (see Plena)			
Kanzan	12	12+	
Kiku-shidare-zakura	4	4	
Kursar	8	8	
Morello (P. cerasus)	4	4	
Okamé (P. × incam)	12	8	
Pandora	12	8	
Pendula Rosea	4	4	
Pendula Rubra	4	4	
Pink Perfection	8	8	
Plena (Grandiflora)	12	8+	
Praecox (P. incisa)	8	8	
Prunus avium (wild cherry)	12+	8+	
Prunus × cistena	1.5	1.5	
Prunus sargentii (Sargent's cherry)	12+	8+	
Prunus serrula (Tibetan cherry)	12	8+	
Shirofugen	8	8	
Shirotai	8	8	
Shōgetsu	8	8	
Spire	12	8	
Stella	4	4	
Ukon	8	8+	

See cherry blossom and Prunus for ornamental trees.

== Production ==
Top (sweet) cherry producing nations in 2020 (tonnes)
Rank	Country	Production
1	Turkey	724,994
2	United States	294,900
3	Chile	255,471
4	Uzbekistan	185,068
5	Iran	164,080
6	Italy	104,380
7	Greece	93,740
8	Spain	82,130
9	Ukraine	63,550
10	Bulgaria	52,330
	World	2,609,550
Source: UN Food & Agriculture Organization

Top sour cherry producing nations in 2020 (tonnes)
Rank	Country	Production
1	Russia	254,800
2	Turkey	189,184
3	Ukraine	174,630
4	Serbia	165,738
5	Poland	153,100
6	Iran	121,651
7	Uzbekistan	70,650
8	United States	63,276
9	Hungary	61,460
10	Belarus	53,763
	World	1,479,045
Source: UN Food & Agriculture Organization

In 2020, world production of sweet cherries was 2.61 million tonnes, with Turkey producing 28% of this total. Other major producers of sweet cherries were the United States and Chile. World production of sour cherries in 2020 was 1.48 million tonnes, led by Russia, Turkey, Ukraine and Serbia.

=== Middle East ===
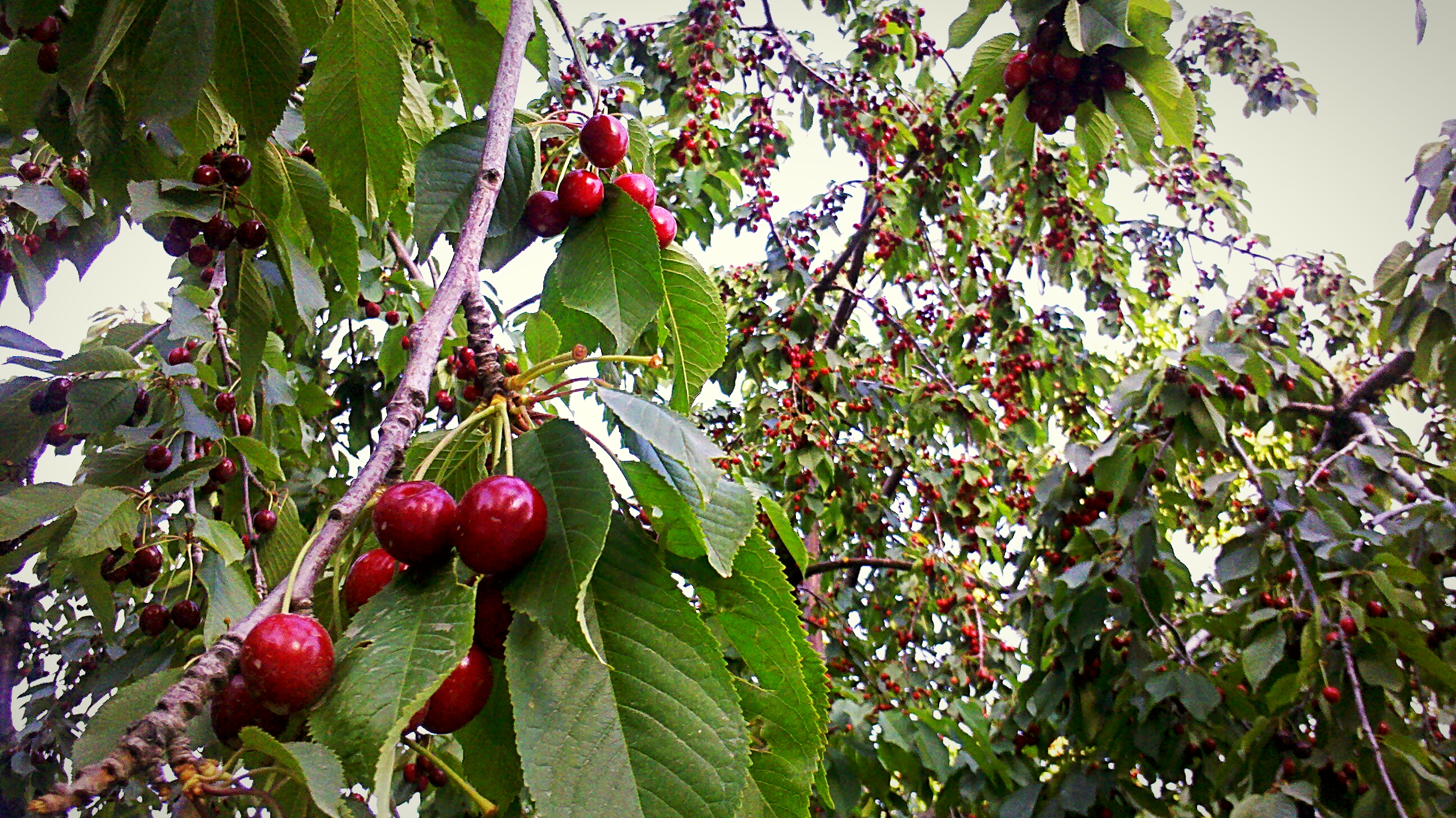
Ripe sweet cherries in Tehran

Major commercial cherry orchards in West Asia are in Turkey, Iran, Syria, Lebanon, and Azerbaijan.

=== Europe ===
Major commercial cherry orchards in Europe are in Turkey, Italy, Spain and other Mediterranean regions, and to a smaller extent in the Baltic States and southern Scandinavia.

In France since the 1920s, the first cherries of the season come in April/May from the region of Céret (Pyrénées-Orientales), where the local producers send, as a tradition since 1932, the first crate of cherries to the president of the Republic.

=== North America ===
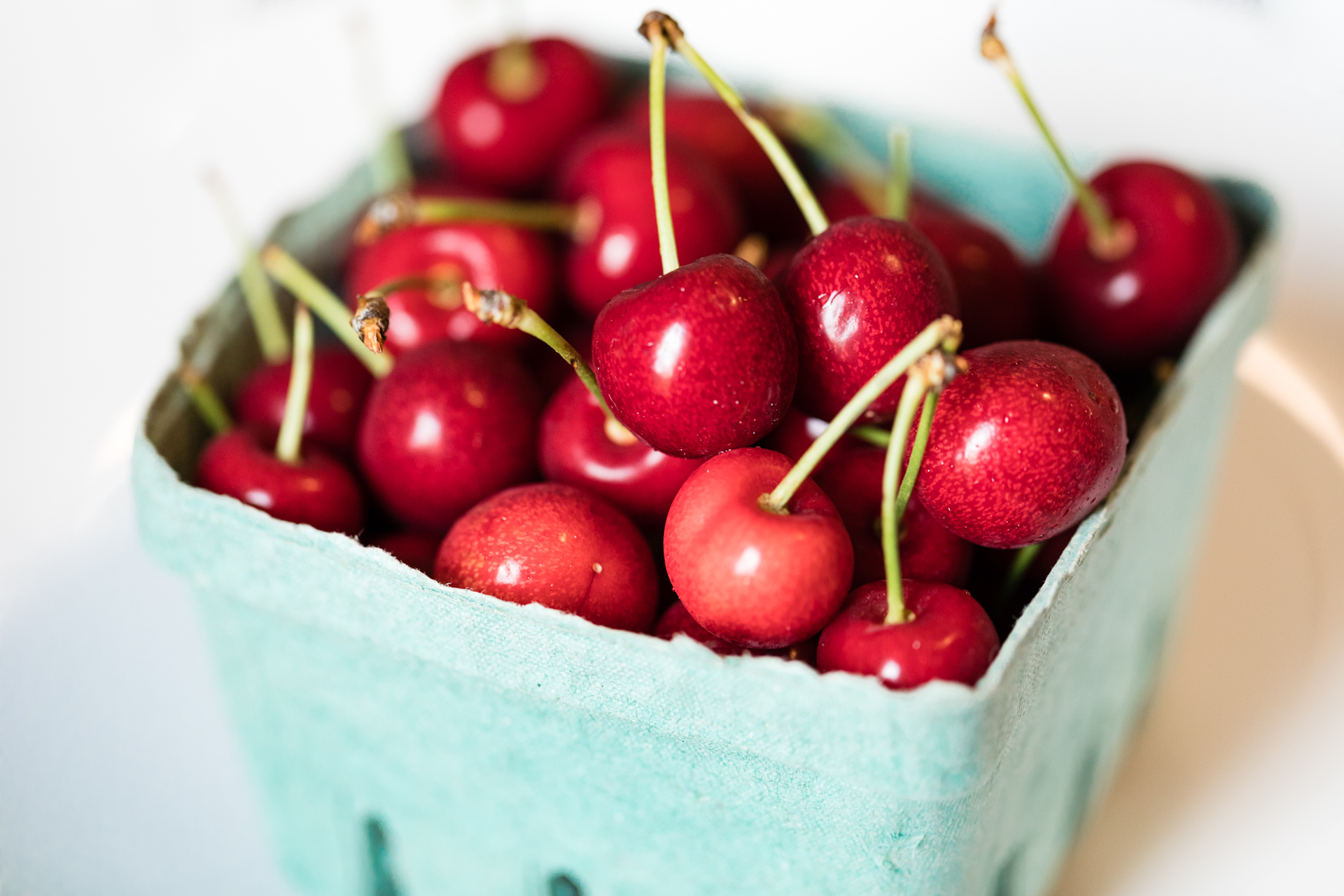
Fresh Michigan cherries in a basket

In the United States, most sweet cherries are grown in Washington, California, Oregon, Wisconsin, and Michigan. Important sweet cherry cultivars include Bing, Ulster, Rainier, Brooks, Tulare, King, and Sweetheart. Both Oregon and Michigan provide light-colored 'Royal Ann' ('Napoleon'; alternately 'Queen Anne') cherries for the maraschino cherry process. Most sour (also called tart) cherries are grown in Michigan, followed by Utah, New York, and Washington. Sour cherries include 'Nanking' and 'Evans.' Traverse City, Michigan is called the "Cherry Capital of the World", hosting a National Cherry Festival.

Most cherry varieties have a chilling requirement of 800 or more hours, meaning that in order to break dormancy, blossom, and set fruit, the winter season needs to have at least 800 hours where the temperature is below 7 °C (45 °F). "Low chill" varieties requiring 300 hours or less are Minnie Royal and Royal Lee, requiring cross-pollinization, whereas the cultivar, Royal Crimson, is self-fertile. These varieties extend the range of cultivation of cherries to the mild winter areas of southern US. This is a boon to California producers of sweet cherries, as California is the second largest producer of sweet cherries in the US.

Native and non-native sweet cherries grow well in Canada's provinces of Ontario and British Columbia where an annual cherry festival has been celebrated for seven consecutive decades in the Okanagan Valley town of Osoyoos. In addition to the Okanagan, other British Columbia cherry growing regions are the Similkameen Valley and Kootenay Valley, all three regions together producing 5.5 million kg annually or 60% of total Canadian output.

=== Australia ===
In Australia, cherries are grown in all states except for the Northern Territory. The major producing regions are located in the temperate areas within New South Wales, Victoria, South Australia and Tasmania. Western Australia has limited production in the elevated parts in the southwest of the state. Key production areas include Young, Orange and Bathurst in New South Wales, Wandin, the Goulburn and Murray valley areas in Victoria, the Adelaide Hills region in South Australia, and the Huon and Derwent Valleys in Tasmania.

Key commercial varieties in order of seasonality include 'Empress', 'Merchant', 'Supreme', 'Ron's seedling', 'Chelan', 'Ulster', 'Van', 'Bing', 'Stella', 'Nordwunder', 'Lapins', 'Simone', 'Regina', 'Kordia' and 'Sweetheart'. New varieties are being introduced, including the late season 'Staccato' and early season 'Sequoia'. The Australian Cherry Breeding program is developing a series of new varieties which are under testing evaluation.

The New South Wales town of Young is called the "Cherry Capital of Australia" and hosts the National Cherry Festival.

== Nutritional value ==
Raw sweet cherries are 82% water, 16% carbohydrates, 1% protein, and negligible in fat (table). As raw fruit, sweet cherries provide little nutrient content per 100 g serving, as only dietary fiber and vitamin C are present in moderate content, while other vitamins and dietary minerals each supply less than 10% of the Daily Value (DV) per serving, respectively (table).

Compared to sweet cherries, raw sour cherries contain 50% more vitamin C per 100 g (12% DV) and about 20 times more vitamin A (8% DV), beta-Carotene in particular (table).

Cherries, sour, red, raw
Nutritional value per 100 g (3.5 oz)
- Energy: 209 kJ (50 kcal)
- Carbohydrates: 12.2 g
- Sugars: 8.5 g
- Dietary fiber: 1.6 g
- Fat: 0.3 g
- Protein: 1 g
Vitamins and minerals
Vitamins	Quantity %DV^{†}
Vitamin A equiv. beta-Carotene lutein zeaxanthin	7% 64 μg 7% 770 μg 85 μg
Thiamine (B1)	3% 0.03 mg
Riboflavin (B2)	3% 0.04 mg
Niacin (B3)	3% 0.4 mg
Pantothenic acid (B5)	3% 0.143 mg
Vitamin B6	3% 0.044 mg
Folate (B9)	2% 8 μg
Choline	1% 6.1 mg
Vitamin C	11% 10 mg
Vitamin K	2% 2.1 μg
Minerals	Quantity %DV^{†}
Calcium	1% 16 mg
Iron	2% 0.32 mg
Magnesium	2% 9 mg
Manganese	5% 0.112 mg
Phosphorus	1% 15 mg
Potassium	6% 173 mg
Sodium	0% 3 mg
Zinc	1% 0.1 mg
- Other constituents: Quantity
- Water: 86 g
- Link to USDA Database entry
- ^{†}Percentages estimated using US recommendations for adults, except for potassium, which is estimated based on expert recommendation from the National Academies.

Cherries, sweet, red, raw
Nutritional value per 100 g (3.5 oz)
- Energy: 263 kJ (63 kcal)
- Carbohydrates: 16 g
- Sugars: 12.8 g
- Dietary fiber: 2.1 g
- Fat: 0.2 g
- Protein: 1.1 g
Vitamins and minerals
Vitamins	Quantity %DV^{†}
Vitamin A equiv. beta-Carotene lutein zeaxanthin	0% 3 μg 0% 38 μg 85 μg
Thiamine (B1)	2% 0.027 mg
Riboflavin (B2)	3% 0.033 mg
Niacin (B3)	1% 0.154 mg
Pantothenic acid (B5)	4% 0.199 mg
Vitamin B6	3% 0.049 mg
Folate (B9)	1% 4 μg
Choline	1% 6.1 mg
Vitamin C	8% 7 mg
Vitamin K	2% 2.1 μg
Minerals	Quantity %DV^{†}
Calcium	1% 13 mg
Iron	2% 0.36 mg
Magnesium	3% 11 mg
Manganese	3% 0.07 mg
Phosphorus	2% 21 mg
Potassium	7% 222 mg
Sodium	0% 0 mg
Zinc	1% 0.07 mg
- Other constituents: Quantity
- Water: 82 g
- Link to USDA Database entry
- ^{†}Percentages estimated using US recommendations for adults, except for potassium, which is estimated based on expert recommendation from the National Academies.

=== Health risks ===
The cherry kernels, accessible by chewing or breaking the hard-shelled cherry pits, contain amygdalin, a chemical that releases the toxic compound hydrogen cyanide when ingested. The amount of amygdalin in each cherry varies widely, and symptoms would show only after eating several crushed pits (3–4 of the Morello variety or 7–9 of the red or black varieties). Swallowing the pits whole normally causes no complications.

== Other uses ==
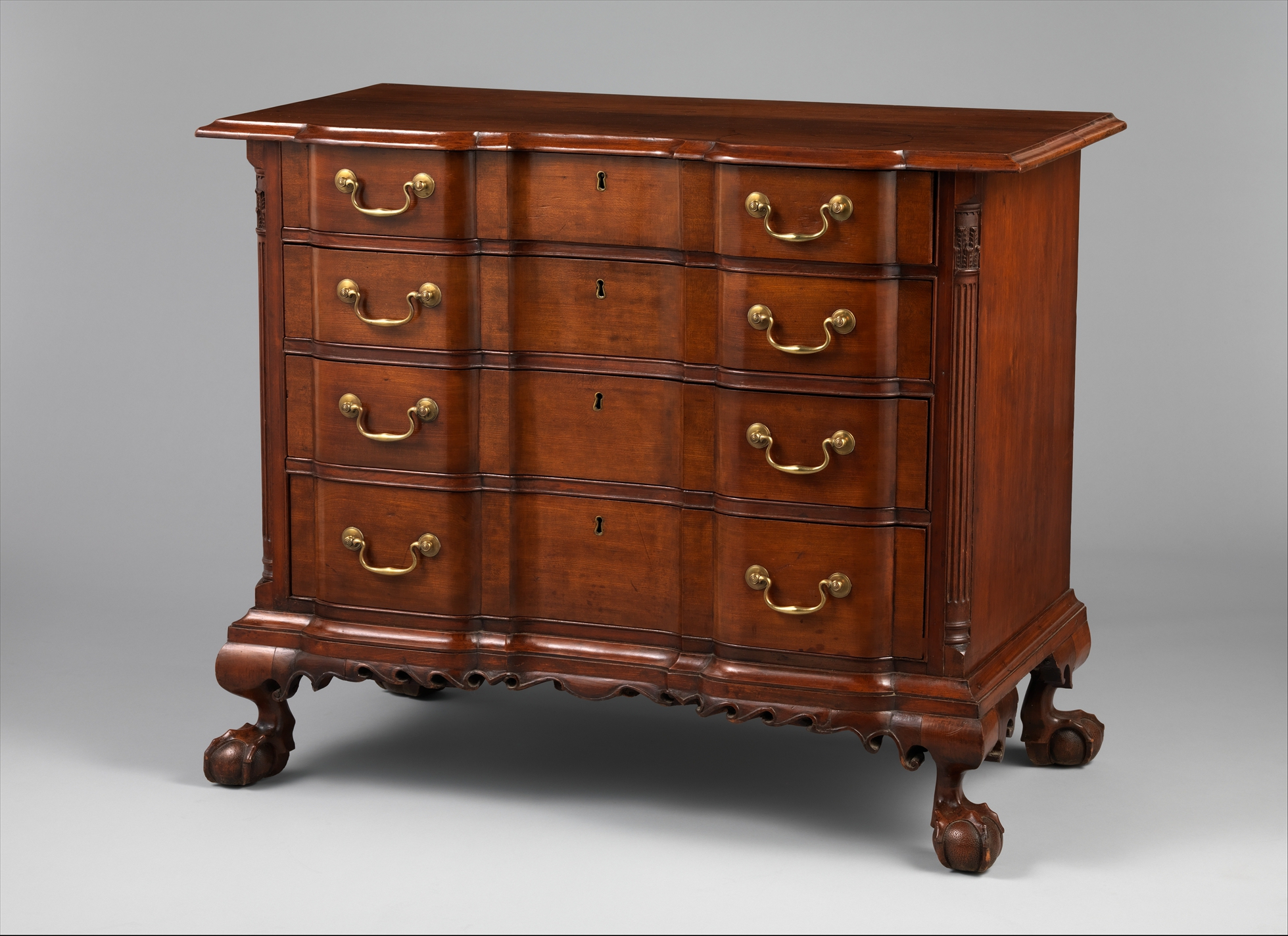
Cherrywood chest of drawers

Cherry wood is valued for its rich color and straight grain in manufacturing fine furniture, particularly desks, tables and chairs.

== See also ==
- Cherry ice cream
- Cherry juice
- Cherry pit oil
- Cherry pitter
- Dried cherry
- Cherry cordial
- List of Award of Garden Merit flowering cherries
- List of cherry dishes
- Mahleb, a spice made out of cherry seeds (found within cherry pits)
- George Washington cherry tree anecdote
