= Cherry juice =

Fruit juice (beverage)

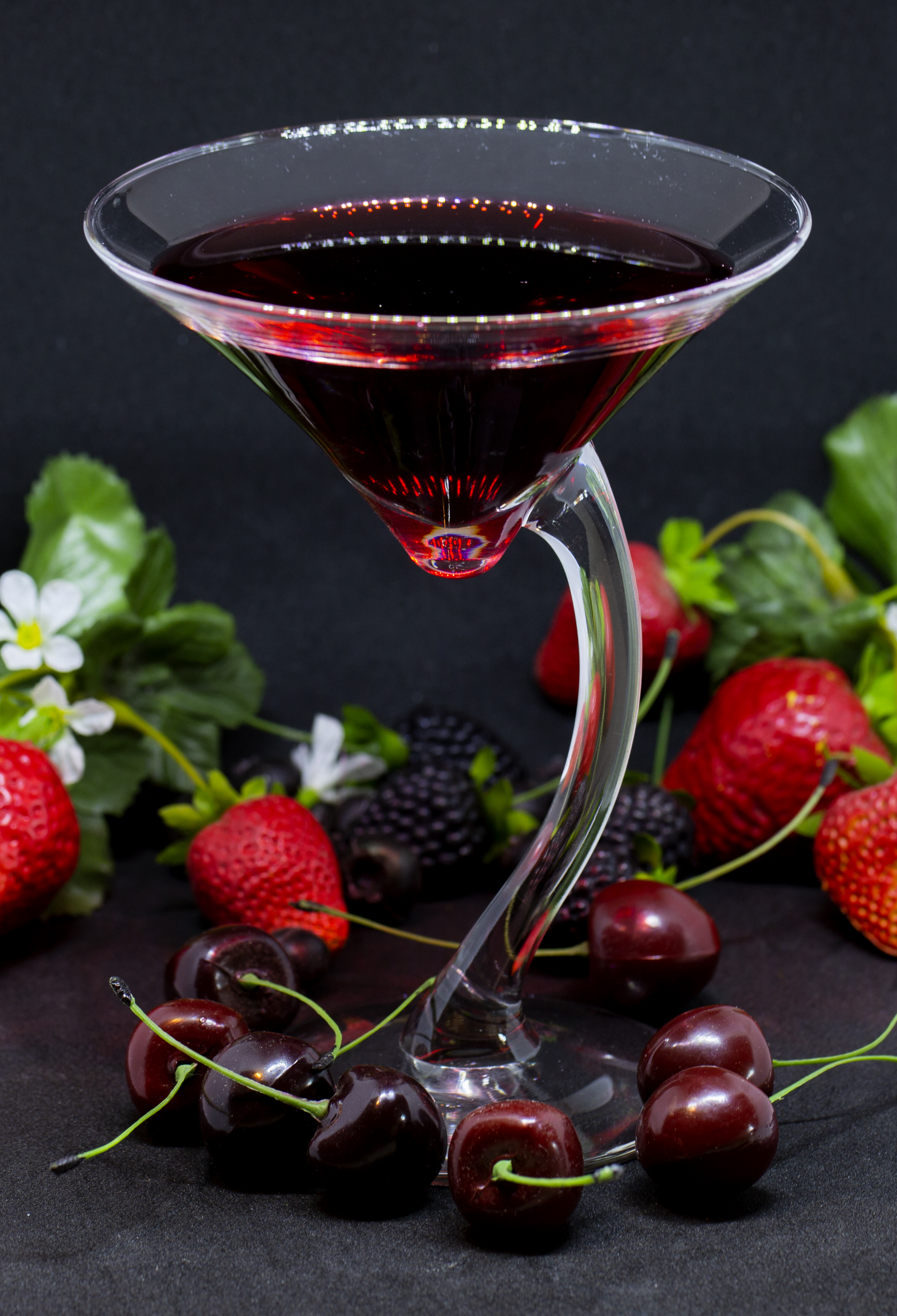
- A glass of Montmorency tart cherry juice

Nutritional value per 1 cup (~240 mL) tart cherry juice
- Carbohydrates
- Sugars: 32.84 g
- Fat: 1.45 g
- Protein: .83 g
Vitamins and minerals
Vitamins	Quantity %DV^{†}
Thiamine (B1)	13%.161 mg
Vitamin B6	6%.10 mg
Vitamin C	0% 0 mg
Minerals	Quantity %DV^{†}
Calcium	3% 35 mg
Iron	6% 1.13 mg
Magnesium	7% 30 mg
Phosphorus	4% 46 mg
Potassium	14% 433 mg
Sodium	0% 11 mg
Zinc	1%.08 mg
- Other constituents: Quantity
- Water: 229.13 g
- 159 calories per cup
- ^{†}Percentages estimated using US recommendations for adults, except for potassium, which is estimated based on expert recommendation from the National Academies.

Cherry juice is a fruit juice consisting of the juice of cherries. It is consumed as a beverage and used as an ingredient in various foods, processed foods and beverages. It is also marketed as a health supplement. It is produced by hot- or cold-pressing cherries, collecting the juice, and then filtering and pasteurizing it.

== Usage ==
=== As a food ===
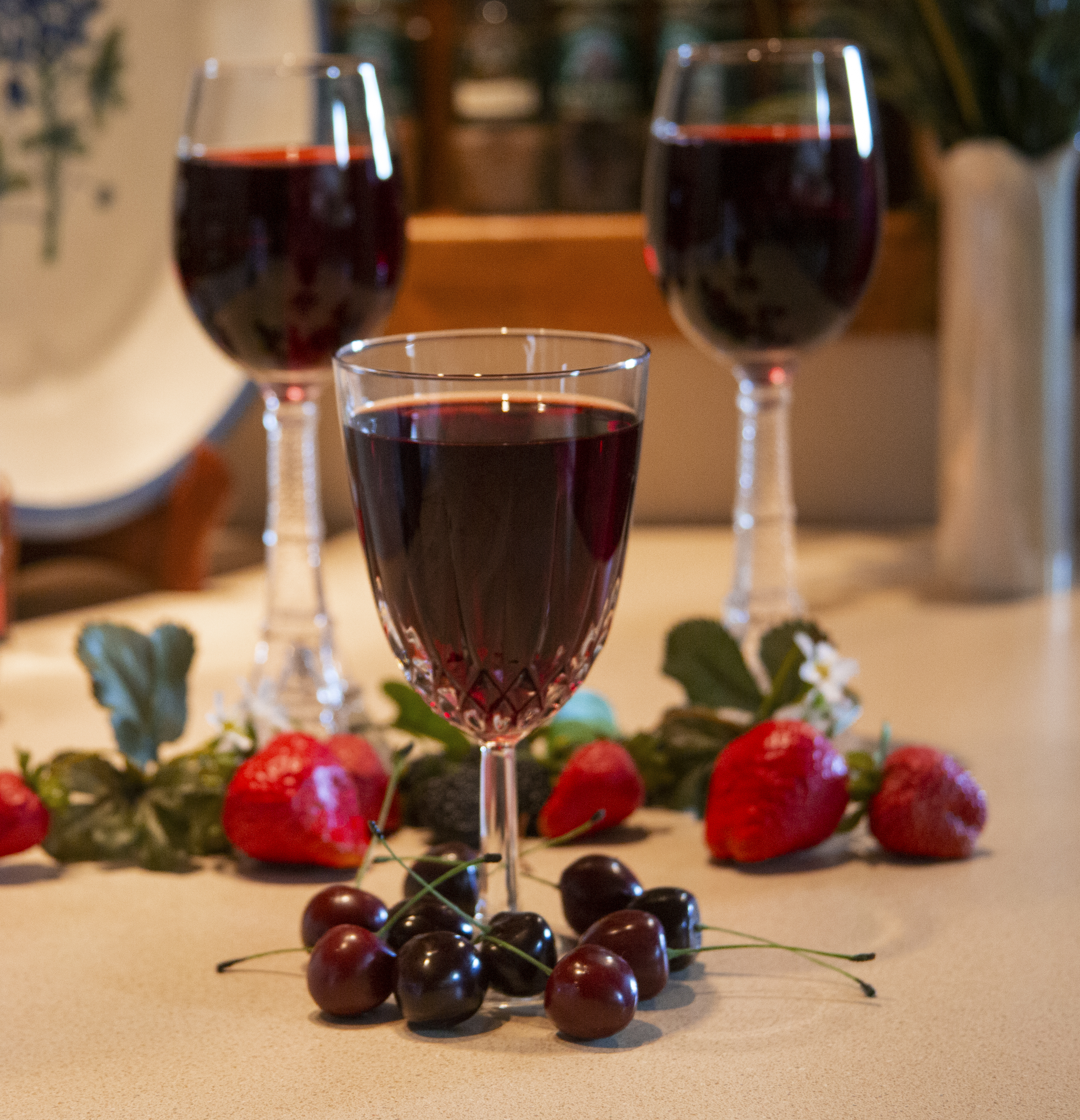
Glasses of Montmorency cherry juice

Cherry juice is a mass-produced food product that is consumed as a beverage and used as an ingredient in various foods, processed foods and beverages. It is sometimes used as an ingredient in cherry ice cream and in cherry pie filling. It is also used as an ingredient in cherry brandy and cherry bounce. Cherry jelly has also been produced using the juice. Cherry juice concentrate is used by food manufacturers in the production of fruit juice blends. Cherry juice from the Montmorency cherry is used to produce cherry essence, which is used as a flavor concentrate by food manufacturers.

=== In alcoholic beverages ===
Kirsch fruit brandy is sometimes produced via the distillation of fermented cherry juice. Cherry juice is also used as an ingredient in beer. For example, Samuel Smith Old Brewery's cherry beer contains 17% of organic cherry juice, and Three Floyds Brewing produces its Battle of Charro II Imperial Brett IPA using cherry juice as an ingredient. Cherry cider has also been brewed by some companies using cherry juice. Sweetened cherry juice is sometimes used in the production of kriek lambic, a distinctively sour, cherry beer style from Belgium.

=== As a dietary supplement ===
Montmorency cherry juice is produced as a dietary supplement, and is manufactured as a concentrate and in capsules as a freeze-dried powder.

Claims have been made that cherry juice can be helpful for improving sleep for people with insomnia, but there is no good evidence to support these claims.

== Commercial production ==
Large-scale commercial cherry juice production is typically produced using a hot extraction or a cold extraction method.

Hot extraction involves heating the cherries, pressing them, and then straining and filtering to remove solids. Hot pressed cherry juice typically has a deeper coloration compared to that produced using cold extraction. The heating of the fruit also serves to prevent the juice from browning, because the heating stops natural enzymic actions that occur when the fruit is macerated.

Cold extraction involves first removing the pits from fresh cherries and then pressing them and collecting the juice. The juice is then heated to kill microorganisms, stop enzyme activity and to solidify particulate matter prior to filtering. As with hot-extracted juice, the cold-extracted juice is also typically strained and filtered. Cold-extracted cherry juice has a greater likeness to the flavor of fresh cherries, and its coloration is lighter compared to that of hot-extracted juice.

Frozen cherries are sometimes used, which enables the creation of a juice that has the cherry-like flavor of cold-extracted juice and a deeper coloration such as that produced by hot extraction.

Ascorbic acid is sometimes added as a color stabilizer prior to the cherries being pressed. The juice is typically filtered and clarified prior to being packaged, and pasteurization or flash pasteurization is typically utilized. It is sometimes processed as a frozen concentrate. Commercial cherry juice concentrate is shipped in bulk containers to food manufacturers and in smaller, consumer-sized containers for retail sales.

In the United States, cherry juice is produced mostly in the state of Wisconsin. More minute amounts are produced in the U.S. states of New York, Pennsylvania and Colorado.

=== Beverage production ===
Pure cherry juice has a strong flavor and can have high acidity, so when produced commercially as a beverage product it is sometimes diluted with water to make it more palatable. Sugar syrup or dry sugar is sometimes added to the product when produced as a beverage. Mixtures of both hot-pressed and cold-pressed juices are sometimes used in the production of cherry juice beverages, which allows for a product that has a desirable coloration and flavor for consumers. Cherry juice is also produced as a carbonated beverage product.

== History ==
Herodotus notes that cherry juice was consumed by the Argippaeans, either fresh or mixed with milk. Cherry juice was also drunk by ancient Romans.

In the late 19th century, cherry juice was not produced in the United States, and was imported from Germany. The imported juice was used by wholesale liquor and drug companies, as well as soda producers. Drug companies typically used the juice to produce syrups for soda water, and liquor companies used it to produce cherry brandy, cherry bounce and liqueurs. German-imported cherry juice was fortified with alcohol to prevent the juice from fermenting, which would spoil it. During this time, juice produced in Magdeburg, Germany from black cherries grown in the area was typically exported to the U.S.

== See also ==
- Cheribundi – a producer of tart cherry juice products
- Cherryade – a beverage
- Cherry cola – a carbonated beverage
- Cherry Smash soda
- Juicing
- List of cherry dishes
- List of juices
