= Moonshine =

High-proof liquor, generally made illicitly

- Type: Whisky
- Alcohol by volume: At least 40%
- Proof (US): At least 80°
- Colour: Clear to off-white depending on ingredients
- Ingredients: Grain (mashing), sugar (fermented water, kilju)

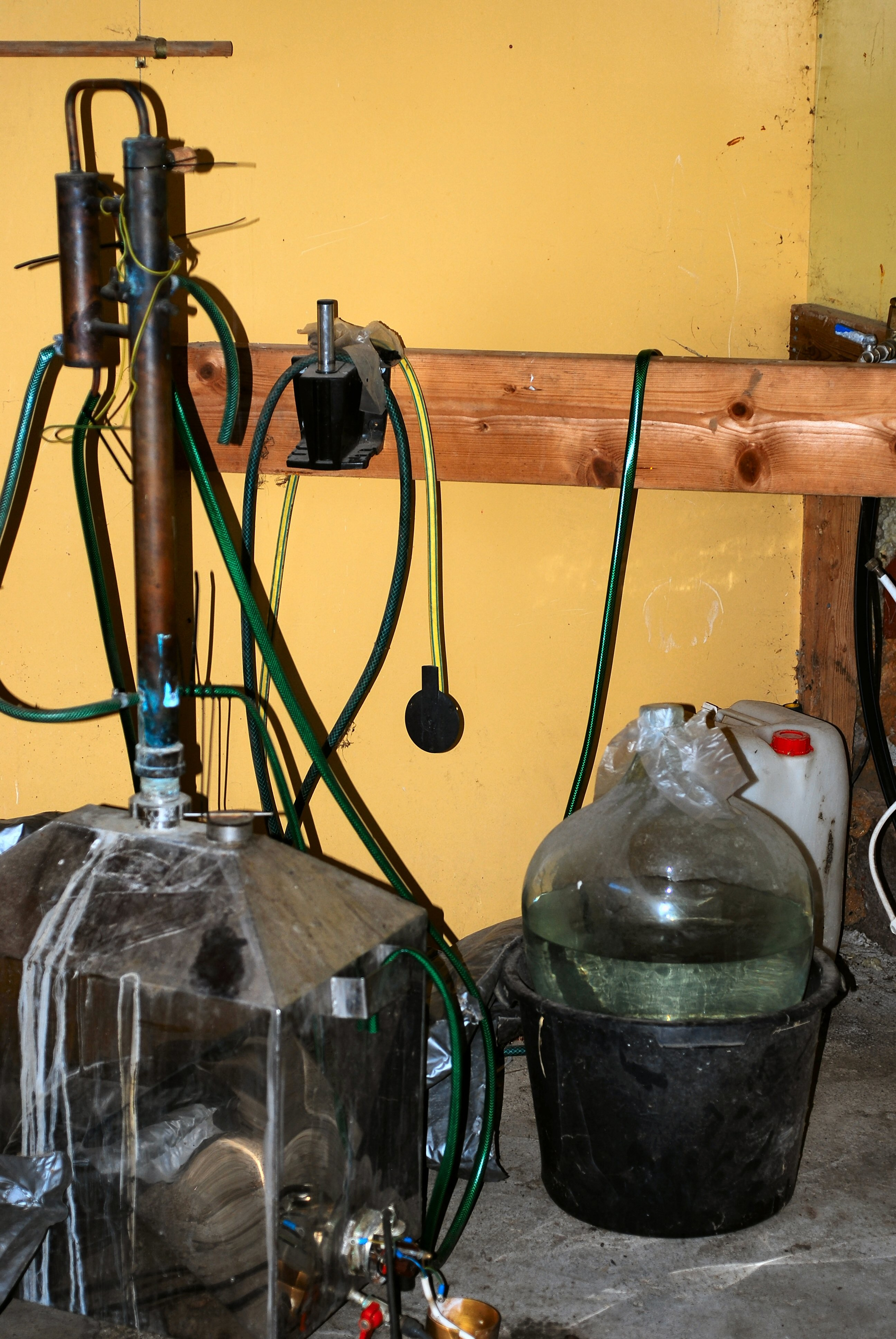
A modern DIY pot still

Moonshine is high-proof liquor, traditionally made or distributed illegally. The name was derived from a tradition of distilling the alcohol at night, usually when the moon was out, to avoid detection.

== Terminology ==
Different languages and countries have their own terms for moonshine.

== Fractional crystallization ==
The ethanol may be concentrated in fermented beverages by means of freezing. For example, the name applejack derives from the traditional method of producing the drink, jacking, the process of freezing fermented cider and then removing the ice, increasing the alcohol content. Starting with the fermented juice, with an alcohol content of less than ten percent, the concentrated result can contain 25–40% alcohol by volume (ABV).

== Moonshine stills ==
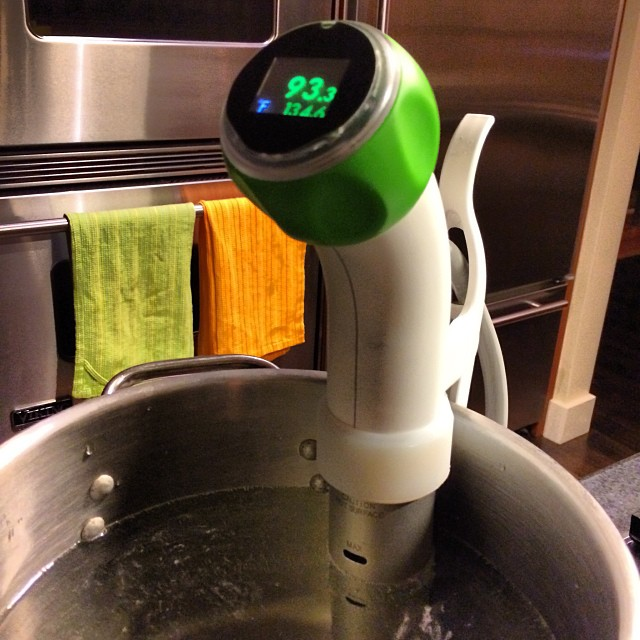
A thermal immersion circulator, like this sous vide stick, is used to evaporate ethanol in plastic stills or spiral stills.

In some countries, moonshine stills are illegal to sell, import, and own without permission. However, enthusiasts explain on internet forums how to obtain equipment and assemble it into a still. To cut costs, stainless steel vessels are often replaced with plastic stills, vessels made from polypropylene that can withstand relatively high heat.

- A column still, or a spiral still, can achieve a vapor alcohol content of 95% ABV.
- Moonshine is usually distilled to 40% ABV, and seldom above 66% based on 48 samples. For example, conventional pot stills commonly produce 40% ABV, and top out between 60% and 80% ABV after multiple distillations. However, ethanol can be dried to 95% ABV by heating 3A molecular sieves such as 3A zeolite.

The preferred heat source for plastic stills or spiral stills is sous vide sticks; these control temperature, time, and circulation, and are therefore preferred over immersion heaters. Multiple units can be used to increase the wattage. Also, sous vide sticks, commonly sold in 1200 W and generally temperature regulated up to 90 °C (194 °F) (ethanol boils at 78 °C (172 °F)), evaporate the ethanol faster than an immersion heater, commonly sold in 300 W. Electrical injury may occur if immersion heaters are modified, such as if a 35 °C (95 °F) thermostat is removed from an aquarium heater (because doing so may break its waterproofing), or if an immersion heater is disassembled from an electric water boiler.

=== Evaporation stills ===
==== Plastic still ====
A plastic still is a device for distillation specially adapted for separating ethanol and water. Plastic stills are common because they are cheap and easy to manufacture. The principle is that a smaller amount of liquid is placed in an open smaller vessel inside a larger one that is closed. A cheap 100 W immersion heater is typically used as heat source, but a thermal immersion circulator, like a sous vide stick is ideal because it comes with a temperature controller. The liquid is kept heated at about 50 °C (122 °F) and slowly evaporates the ethanol to 40% ABV that condense on the inner walls of the outer vessel. The condensation that accumulates in the bottom of the vessel can then be diverted directly down through a filter containing activated carbon. The final product has approximately twice as much alcohol content as the starting liquid and can be distilled several times if stronger distillate is desired. The method is slow, and is not suitable for large-scale production.

=== Boiling stills ===
==== Fractional distillation ====
Fractional distillation is the separation of a mixture into its component parts, or fractions. Chemical compounds are separated by heating them to a temperature at which one or more fractions of the mixture vaporize. It uses distillation to fractionate. Generally the component parts have boiling points that differ by less than 25 °C (45 °F) from each other under a pressure of one atmosphere.

===== Column still =====
Column still legend: 1. Analyzer*; 2. Rectifier*; 1. Wash; 2. Steam; 3. Liquid out; 4. Alcohol vapor; 5. Recycled less volatile components; 6. Most volatile components; 7. Condenser; *Both columns are preheated by steam.

A column still, also called a continuous still, patent still or Coffey still, is a variety of still consisting of two columns. A column still can achieve a vapor alcohol content of 95% ABV.

====== Spiral still ======
A spiral still is a type of column still with a simple slow air-cooled distillation apparatus, commonly used for bootlegging. Column and cooler consist of a 5-foot-long (1.5 m) copper tube wound in spiral form. The tube first goes up to act as a simple column, and then down to cool the product. Cookware usually consists of a 30-litre (6.6 imp gal; 7.9 US gal) plastic wine bucket. The heat source is typically a thermal immersion circulator (commonly runs at 1200 W), like a sous vide stick because it is hard to find 300 W immersion heaters, and it is risky to disassemble the immersion heater from an electric water boiler because it may cause electrical injury. The spiral burner is popular because, despite its simple construction and low manufacturing cost, it can provide 95% ABV.

==== Pot still ====
A pot still is a type of distillation apparatus or still used to distill flavored liquors such as whisky or cognac, but not rectified spirit because they are poor at separating congeners. Pot stills operate on a batch distillation basis (as opposed to a Coffey or column stills, which operate on a continuous basis). Traditionally constructed from copper, pot stills are made in a range of shapes and sizes depending on quantity and style of spirit. Geographic variations in still design exist, with certain kinds popular in parts of Appalachia, a region known for moonshine distilling.

Spirits distilled in pots commonly have 40% ABV, and top out between 60 and 80% after multiple distillations.

== Safety ==
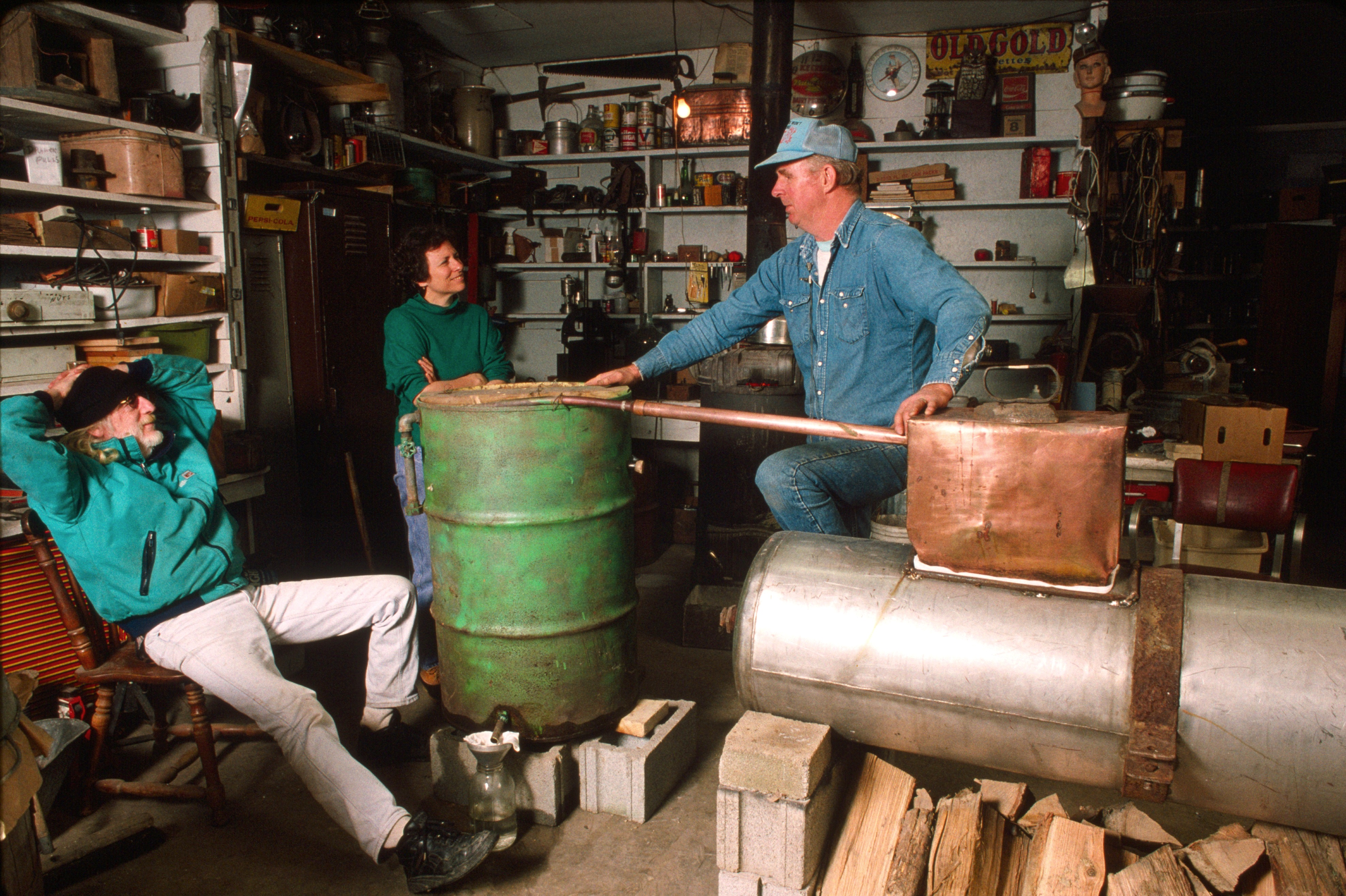
Former West Virginia moonshiner John Bowman explains the workings of a still. (November 1996, American Folklife Center)

Poorly produced moonshine can be contaminated, mainly from materials used in the construction of the still. Stills employing automotive radiators as condensers are particularly dangerous; in some cases, glycol produced from antifreeze can be a problem.

The head that comes immediately after the foreshot (the initial product of the still) typically contains small amounts of other undesirable compounds, such as acetone and various aldehydes. Fusel alcohols are other undesirable byproducts of fermentation that are contained in the "aftershot," and are also typically discarded.

Alcohol concentrations at higher strengths (the GHS identifies concentrations above 24% ABV as dangerous) are flammable and therefore dangerous to handle. This is especially true during the distilling process, when vaporized alcohol may accumulate in the air to dangerous concentrations if adequate ventilation is not provided.

=== Adulterated moonshine ===
Contaminated moonshine can occur if proper materials and techniques are not used. The prolonged consumption of impure moonshine may cause renal disease, primarily from increased lead content.

==== Heavy metals ====
Analysis of Georgia moonshine samples revealed potentially toxic levels of copper, zinc, lead, and arsenic. A review of twelve arsenic poisoning cases found contaminated moonshine responsible for about half, suggesting it may be a significant source in some areas.

==== Lead ====
Radiators used as condensers may contain lead at the plumbing joints, and their use has resulted in blindness or lead poisoning from tainted liquor. This was a deadly hazard during the Prohibition-era United States. Consumption of lead-tainted moonshine is a serious risk factor for saturnine gout, a painful but treatable medical condition that damages the kidneys and joints. A 2004 Virginia study found that of 48 samples of illicitly distilled moonshine seized by law enforcement, 60% of the samples had lead levels above the EPA water guideline of 15 ppb.

The incidence of impure moonshine has been documented to significantly increase the risk of renal disease among those who regularly consume it, primarily from increased lead content.

==== Methanol ====
Contamination is still possible by unscrupulous distillers using cheap methanol to increase the apparent strength of the product. Moonshine can be made both more palatable and perhaps less dangerous by discarding the "foreshot" – the first 50–150 millilitres (1.8–5.3 imp fl oz; 1.7–5.1 US fl oz) of alcohol that drip from the condenser. Because methanol vaporizes at a lower temperature than ethanol, it is commonly assumed that the foreshot contains most of the methanol, if any, from the mash. However, research shows that a larger fraction of methanol is present at the end of the distillation run.

Outbreaks of methanol poisoning have occurred from methanol accidentally produced in moonshine production or deliberately used to strengthen it.

==== Purification ====
In modern times, reducing methanol with the absorption of a molecular sieve is a practical method for production.

==== Methanol safety by fermentation ingredient ====
- Grain starches: Methanol is not produced in toxic amounts by fermentation of sugars from grain starches.
- Methanol is produced in the fermentation of fruits via the action of pectin methylesterase, while of regulatory concern this does not typically exceed toxic levels and poisonings typically occur from methanol addition (e.g. as a lacing agent).

=== Tests ===
==== Alcohols ====
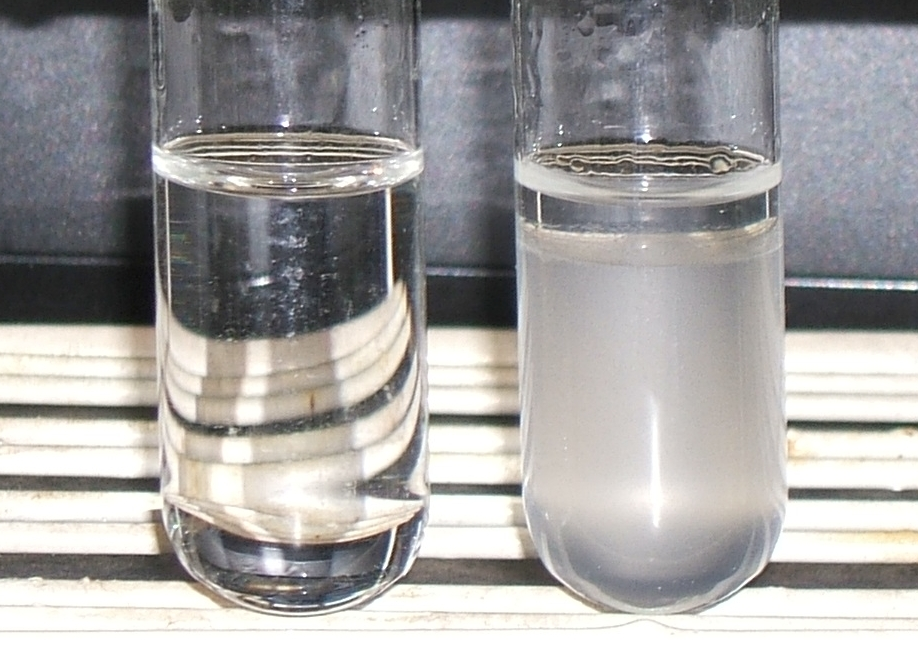
Lucas test: Negative (left) with ethanol and positive with t-butanol.

The Lucas test in alcohols is a test to differentiate between primary, secondary, and tertiary alcohols. It can be used to detect the levels of fusel alcohols.

==== Strength ====
A quick estimate of the alcoholic strength, or proof, of the distillate (the ratio of alcohol to water) is often achieved by shaking a clear container of the distillate. Large bubbles with a short duration indicate a higher alcohol content, while smaller bubbles that disappear more slowly indicate lower alcohol content.

A more reliable method is to use an alcoholmeter or hydrometer. A hydrometer is used during and after the fermentation process to determine the potential alcohol percentage of the moonshine, whereas an alcoholmeter is used after the product has been distilled to determine the volume percent or proof.

=== Misconceptions ===
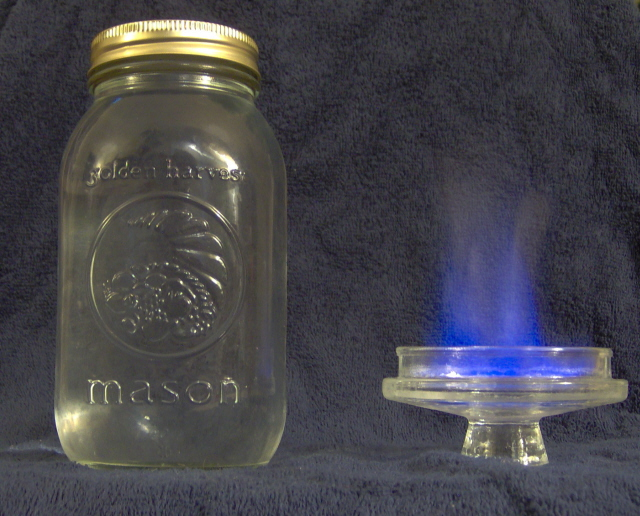
A typical jar of moonshine, with a sample being ignited to produce a blue flame. It was once wrongly thought that the blue flame meant that it was safe to drink.

A common folk test for the quality of moonshine was to pour a small quantity of it into a spoon and set it on fire. The theory was that a safe distillate burns with a blue flame, but a tainted distillate burns with a yellow flame. Practitioners of this simple test also held that if a radiator coil had been used as a condenser, then there would be lead in the distillate, which would give a reddish flame. This led to the mnemonic, "Lead burns red and makes you dead," or simply, "Red means dead."

== Legality ==
Manufacturing of spirits through distilling, fractional crystallization, etc. outside a registered distillery is illegal in many countries.

=== USA ===
A federal ban on home distilling was put in place during the Reconstruction era in 1868 in part to prevent tax avoidance on the sales of homebrew moonshine. This ban remains in place as of 2026, but in a case decided by the United States Court of Appeals for the Fifth Circuit, the ban was considered unconstitutional as an unlawful means for Congress to excise its tax authority. The ruling would still ban sales of moonshine but not prevent making it as a hobbyist or personal consumption. Two weeks later, the Sixth Circuit upheld the ban as constitutional as part of the regulation of interstate commerce, creating a circuit split.

There are six states that allow the production of moonshine for personal consumption (Alaska, Arizona, Maine, Massachusetts, Missouri, and New Hampshire). Additionally, North Dakota law permits the production of moonshine for personal consumption up to the federally legal amount of zero gallons, meaning that production of any amount is illegal.

Legal States
States	Legality
Alaska	Personal use only
Arizona	Must have a permit for personal use/register still
Maine	Produce up to 24 proof gallons of distilled spirits per person over 21 per year
Massachusetts	Personal use on own property only
Missouri	Personal use up to 200 US gallons (760 L) per year
New Hampshire	Liquor that is produced from 100/200 gallons of beer or wine per individual/household per year
North Dakota	Only up to federally-allowed amount (zero gallons)

== History ==
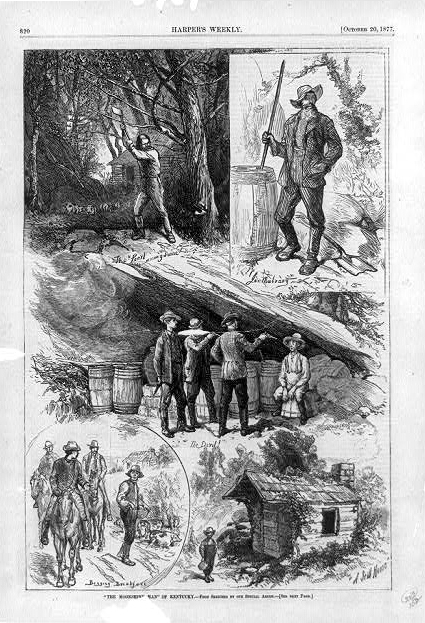
The Moonshine Man of Kentucky, an illustration from Harper's Weekly, 1877, showing five scenes from the life of a Kentucky moonshiner

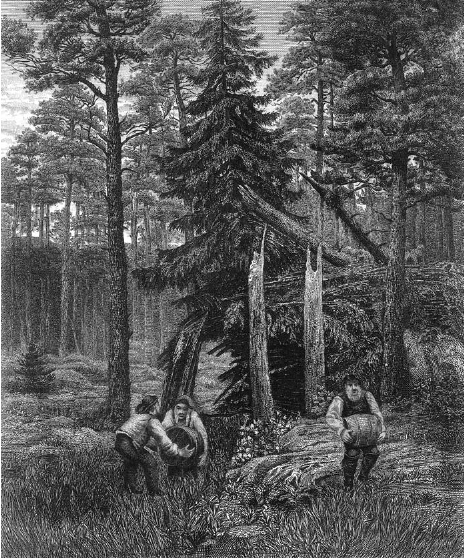
Moonshining, a scene from the archipelago of Loviisa in the 19th century, by Berndt Lindholm

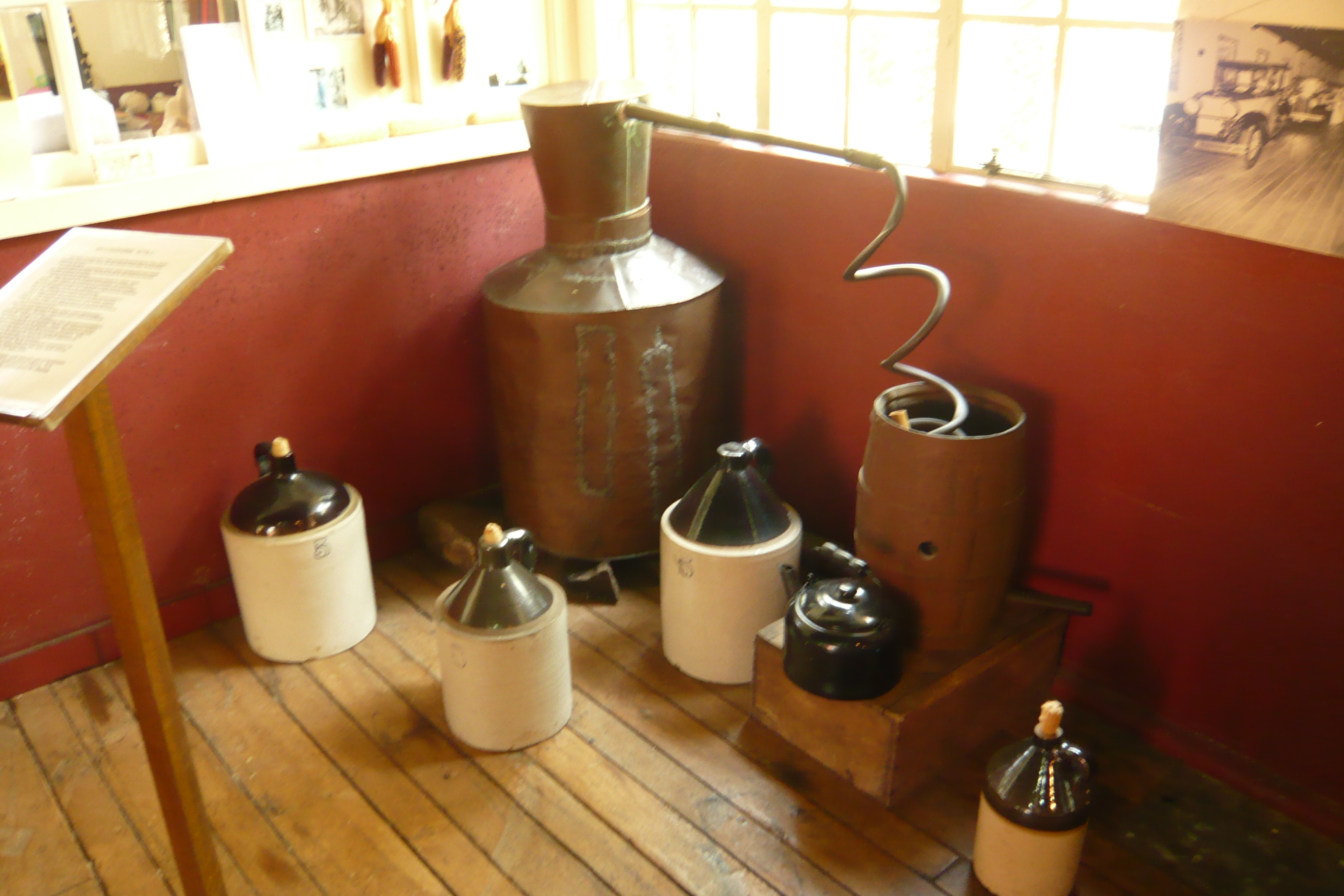
A historical moonshine distilling-apparatus in a museum

Traditionally, moonshine usually is a clear, unaged whiskey, made with barley mash in Scotland and in Ireland, and made with maize corn mash in the United States. The word moonshine originated in the 18th century, in the British Isles, as a result of excise tax laws, and became an American English usage in the post–Independence U.S. after the Tariff of 1791 (Excise Whiskey Tax of 1791) outlawed un-registered distilleries, which provoked the Whiskey Rebellion (1791–1794), wherein for four years the Excise Whiskey Tax went unpaid by the tax rebels by way of violent protest. The Excise Whiskey Tax was law until 1802, upon repeal of the Tariff of 1791.

In the 19th century, the Revenue Act of 1861 and the Revenue Act of 1862 levied heavy taxes upon the distilleries producing vinous spirits, which taxation increased the number of illegal distilleries, which then increased police actions by the IRS agents despatched to collect taxes from distilleries; the agents were known as Revenuers. Illegal distilling accelerated during the Prohibition era (1920–1933), which mandated a total ban on alcohol production under the Eighteenth Amendment of the Constitution. Since the amendment was repealed in 1933, laws focus on evasion of taxation on any type of spirits or intoxicating liquors. Applicable laws were historically enforced by the Bureau of Alcohol, Tobacco, Firearms and Explosives of the US Department of Justice, but are now usually handled by state agencies.

=== Etymology ===
The earliest known instance of the term "moonshine" being used to refer to illicit alcohol dates to the 1785 edition of Grose's Dictionary of the Vulgar Tongue, which was published in England. Prior to that, "moonshine" referred to anything "illusory" or to literally the light of the moon. The U.S. Government considers the word a "fanciful term" and does not regulate its use on the labels of commercial products; as such, legal moonshines may be any type of spirit, which must be indicated elsewhere on the label.

=== Prohibition in the United States ===
In Prohibition-era United States, moonshine distillation was done at night to deter discovery. While moonshiners were present in urban and rural areas around the United States after the Civil War, moonshine production concentrated in Appalachia because the limited road network made it easy to evade revenue officers and because it was difficult and expensive to transport corn crops. As a study of farmers in Cocke County, Tennessee, observes: "One could transport much more value in corn if it was first converted to whiskey. One horse could haul ten times more value on its back in whiskey than in corn." Moonshiners such as Maggie Bailey of Harlan County, Kentucky, Amos Owens of Rutherford County, North Carolina, and Marvin "Popcorn" Sutton of Maggie Valley, North Carolina, became legendary.

Once the liquor was distilled, drivers called "runners" or "bootleggers" smuggled moonshine liquor across the region in cars specially modified for speed and load-carrying capacity. The cars were ordinary on the outside but modified with souped-up engines, extra interior room, and heavy-duty shock absorbers to support the weight of the illicit alcohol. After Prohibition ended, the out-of-work drivers kept their skills sharp through organized races, which led to the formation of the National Association for Stock Car Auto Racing (NASCAR). Several former "runners," such as Junior Johnson, became noted drivers in the sport.

Some varieties of maize corn grown in the United States were once prized for their use in moonshine production. One such variety used in moonshine, Jimmy Red corn, a "blood-red, flint-hard 'dent' corn with a rich and oily germ," almost became extinct when the last grower died in 2000. Two ears of Jimmy Red were passed on to "seed saver" Ted Chewning, who saved the variety from extinction and began to produce it on a wider scale.

There have been modern-day attempts on the state level to legalize home distillation of alcohol, similar to how some states have been treating cannabis, despite there being federal laws prohibiting the practice. For example, the New Hampshire state legislature has tried repeatedly to pass laws allowing unlicensed home distillation of small batches. In 2023, Ohio introduced legislation to do the same. In 2026, the United States Court of Appeals for the Fifth Circuit ruled home distillation bans unconstitutional, pending appeal. If not appealed, this ruling would apply to Texas, Louisiana, and Mississippi.

== See also ==
- Bootleggers and Baptists
- Bureau of Alcohol, Tobacco, Firearms and Explosives (ATF)
- Congener (alcohol)
- Dixie Mafia
- Farmhouse ale
- Free Beer
- Homebrewing
- Moonshine by country
- Moonshine in popular culture
- Nip joint
- Rum-running
- Sour mash

== Sources ==
- Davis, Elaine. Minnesota 13: "Wet" Wild Prohibition Days (2007) ISBN 978-0-9798017-0-9
- Peine, Emelie K.; Schafft, Kai A. (Spring–Fall 2012). "Moonshine, Mountaineers, and Modernity: Distilling Cultural History in the Southern Appalachian Mountains". Journal of Appalachian Studies. 18 (1/2). Appalachian Studies Association: 93–112. doi:10.2307/23337709. JSTOR 23337709. S2CID 142229259.
- Rowley, Matthew. Moonshine! History, songs, stories, and how-tos (2007) ISBN 978-1-57990-648-1
- Watman, Max. Chasing the White Dog: An Amateur Outlaw's Adventures in Moonshine (2010) ISBN 978-1-4391-7024-3
- King, Jeff. The Home Distiller's Workbook: Your Guide to Making Moonshine, Whisky, Vodka, Rum and So Much More! (2012) ISBN 978-1-4699-8939-6
