= Amos Owens =

Amos Owens (ca. 1822 – 1906), aka The Cherry Bounce King, was a nineteenth and early twentieth century moonshine producer who lived in Rutherford County, North Carolina. Of Irish descent, his grandfather fought in the Battle of King's Mountain in the Revolutionary War. He was renowned for the mixture of whiskey, honey and cherries and "[p]eople from all over the South visited him to taste his celebrated beverage." At its peak, the "cherry bounce" that Owens produced on his Cherry Mountain, North Carolina estate was served as far west as the Mississippi River.

== Early life ==
Owens was born around 1822 in North Carolina, where he grew up without receiving any formal education, other than a few days of organized schooling. At age nine, he was hired out as a "drawer of water and hewer of trees", an occupation that he held for thirteen years and that provided him enough money to buy 100 acres on Cherry Mountain at the age of 23. Shortly after buying this first tract on Cherry Mountain, he married a local woman named Mary Ann Sweezey, paying the justice of the peace who oversaw their vows in brandy. At age 29, he'd earned enough from distilling to purchase all of Cherry Mountain, where he would live for the remainder of his life.

During this time, he also developed his renowned "cherry bounce", a liqueur consisting of corn whiskey, cherries, and either sourwood honey or sugar water.

== Civil War years ==
Like many other moonshiners from western North Carolina, eastern Tennessee, and Kentucky, Owens joined the Confederate Army during the Civil War, fighting in the Battle of Bull Run and later serving in the 56th North Carolina Regiment. During the War, he served time in Union stockades. When he returned home to Cherry Mountain, he vowed never to pay the federal excise tax on distilled spirits which President Lincoln had reintroduced in 1862 to help fund the Union's war efforts.

== Post-Civil War years ==
For a number of years, Owens hosted an annual celebration on the second Sunday of June that included as much food and cherry bounce as a person could consume for 25 cents. Activities during the celebration included boxing, dancing, "gander pulling", and dog fighting. After the celebration ended each year, Owens often buried the proceeds. During this time, his cherry bounce became popular across much of the Southeast, reaching as far west as the Mississippi River "where bartenders kept a few jugs in the luxury paddle wheelers that plied the river from Cincinnati to New Orleans."

Owens often used a telescope to spot IRS revenue agents before they reached his stills. However, he was not always successful in evading the agents. Over the course of his more than fifty years distilling spirits, Owens spent time in the federal penitentiary three times, and appeared in court four times for illegal distilling activities. He last appeared in court for illegal distilling at the age of sixty-eight. Following this last appearance, evidence suggests he ceased all distilling activities.
