= Cherry bounce =

Liqueur made by infusing brandy with cherries and sugar

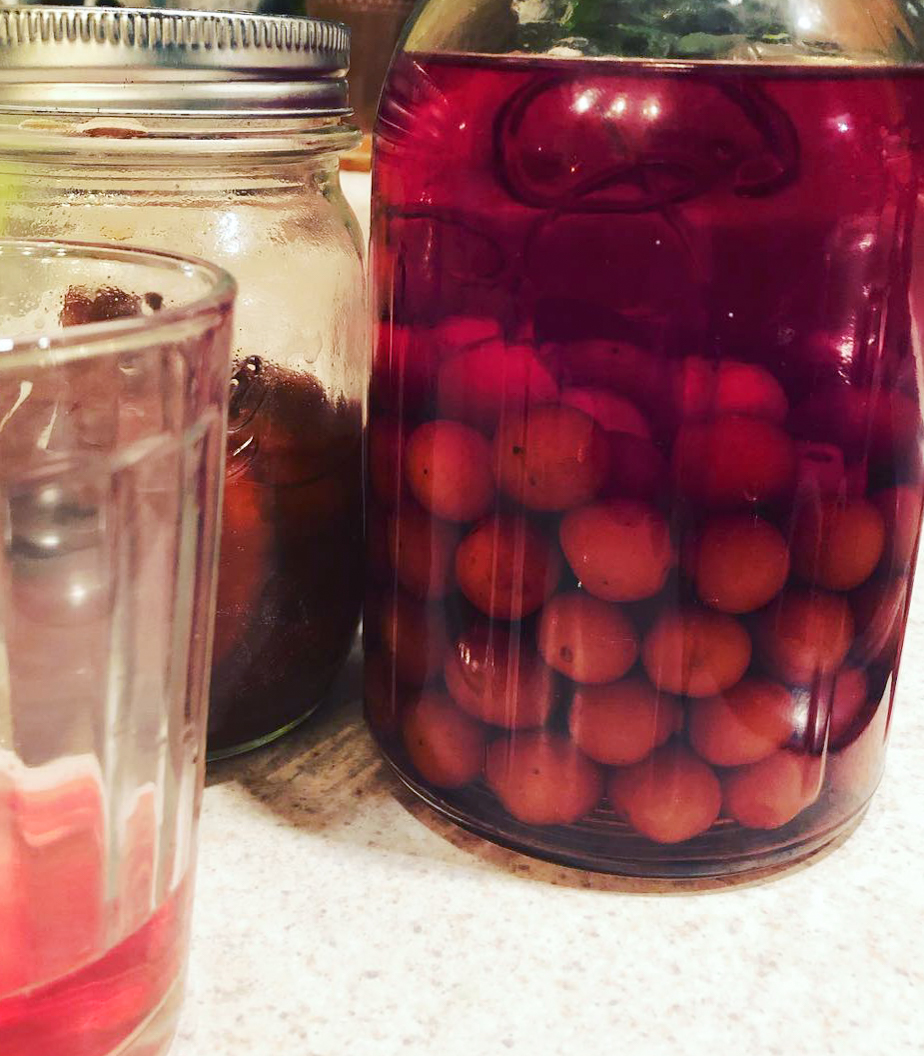

Cherry Bounce is a type of liqueur made by infusing old French brandy with Prunus cerasus (sour cherry), cinnamon, nutmeg, and sugar. Some recipes use rum, whiskey or vodka instead of brandy.

== Origins and etymology ==
The English hamlet of Frithsden claims to have originated the Cherry Bounce. A lane leading off the Old High Street in nearby Hemel Hempstead is named Cherry Bounce and is shown having had this name in maps dating back to the early 19th century. The drink, however, is at least a century older. "Cherrybounce" is recorded as an individual's nickname in a House of Lords report in 1670.

The name of the drink may derive from an 18th-century definition of the term bounce which meant a "sharp blow". The name of the drink would thus impart a meaning similar to the modern term "shot".

Ginjinha is a similar liquor popular in Portugal, that seems to date back to the 15-16 century.

== Preparation and history ==
Early English recipes called for the use of brandy, while later recipes introduced substitutions for both the alcohol and sweetener used. The liqueur, which is popular in parts of the United States, also has a long history there.

In 1687 Robert DePriest a French Huguenot, brought cherry tree cuttings and stones from France which he planted on his plantation on the Pamunkey River between Totopotomoy and Mattadequin Creeks, arrived in New Kent County, Colonial Virginia and planted 20 acres of Prunus cerasus (Kentish Sour Cherry) trees he brought from southern France. Their orchard of Prunus cerasus var. caproniana is where the botanical name for the "Kentish Red Cherry" originated.

In 1729, William DePriest produced the liqueur Cherry Bounce for their neighbor Col. John Dandridge's wedding to Frances Orlando Jones. In the cold winter of January 1759, DePriest attended and provided 4 barrels of Cherry Bounce to George and Martha Washington's Wedding. Patrick Henry's brother-in-law David Shelton married Elizabeth DePriest and Cherry Bounce was served in Hanover Tavern.

A recipe written by Elizabeth DePriest was found among the papers of Martha Washington. This recipe called for old French brandy and is said to have been one of George Washington's favorite drinks.

William DePriest, fourth generation in America, hero of Kings Mountain, planted enough cherry trees to have two mountains in Rutherford County, North Carolina named after him. DePriest Mountain and Little DePriest Mountain, also called The Priest and Little Priest, are both sometimes referred to as Cherry Mountain.

The moonshine producer Amos Owens, known as the "Cherry Bounce King", famously purchased land on Cherry Mountain, North Carolina where he distilled Cherry Bounce in large volumes until around 1900.

The most common preparation involves picking the cherries in early May, then letting them steep in the liquor and spices until Thanksgiving or Christmas.

== See also ==
- Cherry brandy, cherries macerated in spirit
- Cherry juice
