= Cherryade =

Soft drink

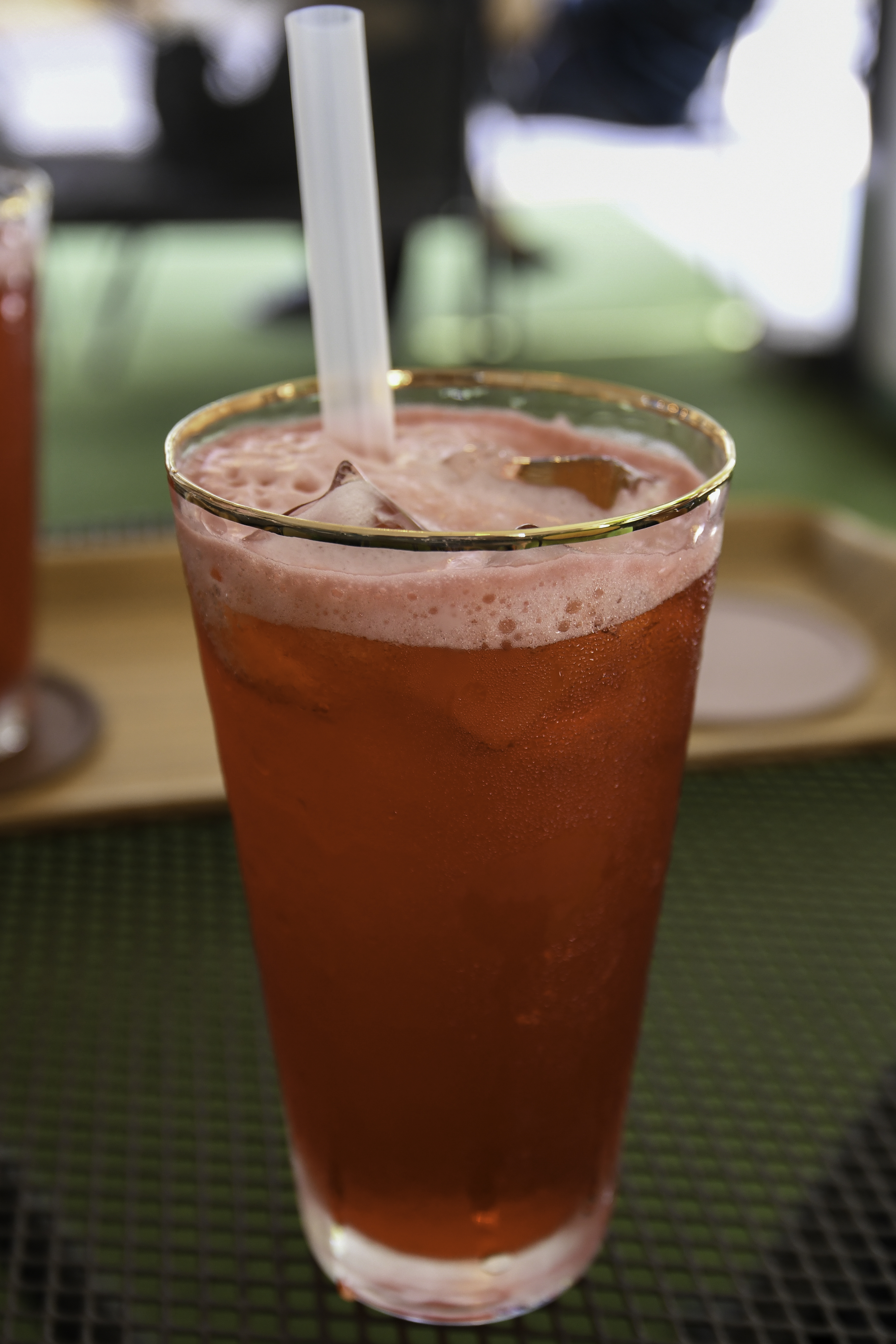
A glass of cherryade

Cherryade (/ˌtʃɛriˈeɪd/) is a carbonated soft drink made from cherry juice. It has also been produced as a non-carbonated beverage.

It was first produced in the 19th century, along with other beverages such as limeade and ginger beer, which had come about due to the popularity of lemonade. The London-based soft drinks company R. White's was a notable early producer of the drink.

== See also ==
- Ade (drink suffix)
- Cherry cola
- List of brand name soft drinks products
- List of soft drink flavors
- List of soft drink producers
- List of soft drinks by country
