= Ulster cherry =

Cherry cultivar

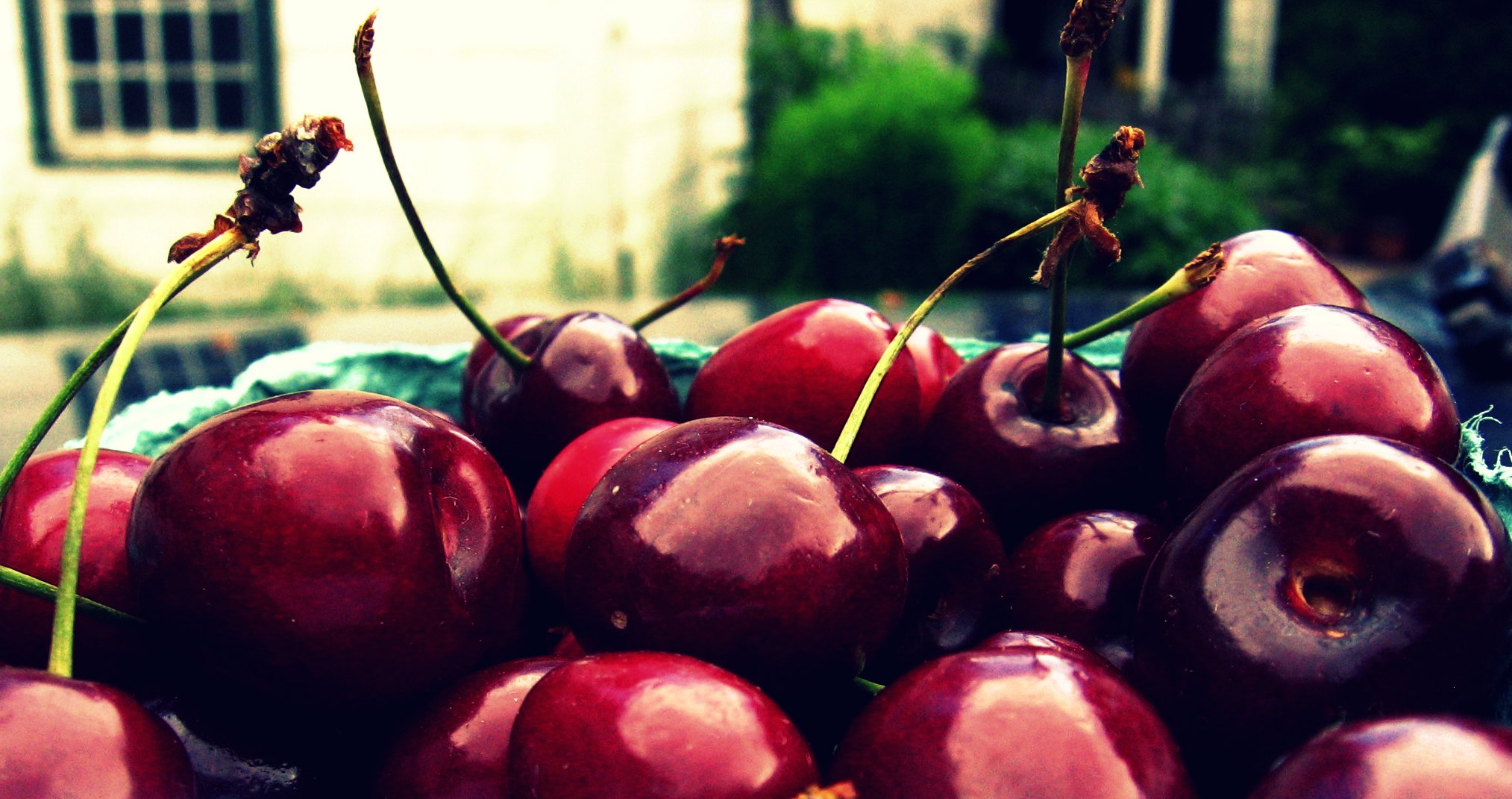
- 'Ulster' cherries
- Genus: Prunus
- Species: Prunus avium
- Hybrid parentage: 'Schmidt' x 'Lambert'
- Cultivar: 'Ulster'
- Breeder: Cornell University
- Origin: Ithaca, New York, US in 1937

The Ulster cherry is a sweet cherry cultivar (Prunus avium) that originated in the United States.

== History ==
The 'Ulster' cherry was created through an agricultural breeding program at Cornell University in Ithaca, New York, in 1937, and was first introduced in 1964. It derives from the crossing of the 'Schmidt' cherry (a mid-season cultivar that produces a dark red, moderately large fruit of a good quality and superior crack resistance) and the 'Lambert' cherry (a heart-shaped cultivar with dark red and moderately firm flesh and a sweet flavor).

The 'Ulster' cherry is named after Ulster County, New York, a region that is home to commercial sweet cherry production. It is grown across North America and has been successfully introduced in Europe and Australia. The cultivar can be produced in harsh climates: when Norway launched its sweet cherry commercial production, the cultivar was imported for planting in that nation's fjord district, located at latitude 60°N.

== Characteristics ==
The 'Ulster' cherry is a midseason cultivar. The dark red fruit is firm and large, sometimes measuring more than one inch in diameter. Its fruit has a strong resistance to cracking brought about by pre-harvest rains, and the trees growing the Ulster cherry have been documented as showing a higher resistance to southwest trunk winter injury, cherry leaf spot and the late spring frosts that can prove fatal to this cultivar. Cracking can be high on some young trees, but the level of cracking declines as the trees mature.

== Usage ==
The 'Ulster' cherry’s sweet taste has made it popular in several formats. It can be consumed as freshly picked fruit, and it is also used in canned cherries products. It has also been incorporated into wine production. The Peninsula Cellars Melange, created by Michigan’s Peninsula Cellars wine from a mixture of fermented sweet black 'Ulster' cherry juice and pure grape brandy, won the Best of Show Award at the 1998 Michigan State Fair.
