= Argippaeans =

Ancient tribe from near the Ural Mountains

The Argippaeans or Argippaei are a people mentioned by Herodotus in his The Histories. They were cited to be living north of the Scythians, and much of the scholarship points to them being a tribe near the Ural Mountains. There are scholars who believe that Herodotus could be talking about the Mongolians based on their physical description as well as their culture.

Herodotus only relied on secondary sources for his account, drawing from descriptions of Greeks and Scythians such as the detail about the Argippaeans as bald people. They were said to have settled in a land that is flat and deep-soiled. This was believed to be in the outliers of the Altai mountains while the T'ien Shan lies on the other side just before an impenetrable barrier of mountains called eremos.

== In Herodotus ==
As far as their country, the tract of land whereof I have been speaking is all a smooth plain, and the soil deep; beyond you enter on a region which is rugged and stony. Passing over a great extent of this rough country, you come to a people dwelling at the foot of lofty mountains, who are said to be all—both men and women—bald from their birth, to have flat noses, and very long chins. These people speak a language of their own,. the dress which they wear is the same as the Scythian. They live on the fruit of a certain tree, the name of which is Ponticum; in size it is about equal to our fig-tree, and it bears a fruit like a bean, with a stone inside. When the fruit is ripe, they strain it through cloths; the juice which runs off is black and thick, and is called by the natives “aschy.” They lap this up with their tongues, and also mix it with milk for a drink; while they make the lees, which are solid, into cakes, and eat them instead of meat; for they have but few sheep in their country, in which there is no good pasturage. Each of them dwells under a tree, and they cover the tree in winter with a cloth of thick white felt, but take off the covering in the summer-time. No one harms these people, for they are looked upon as sacred—they do not even possess any warlike weapons. When their neighbours fall out, they make up the quarrel; and when one flies to them for refuge, he is safe from all hurt. They are called the Argippaeans.”

— Herodotus, The Histories, Translated by George Rawlinson
