= Cherry pit oil =

Seed oil derived from the pits of cherries

Cherry pit oil, also referred to as cherry kernel oil, is a seed oil that is derived from the pits of cherries. It is used for culinary purposes as a flavorant, as a fragrance and as an ingredient in cosmetics, such as lipstick.

== Properties ==
The oil has a brownish to yellow color in its natural state, and after it is purified, its color is pale golden. It has been described as having a "nutty" odor.

== Culinary uses ==
Culinary uses of cherry pit oil include serving as a flavorant in beverages, ice cream and condiments.
