= Evans Cherry =

Cherry cultivar

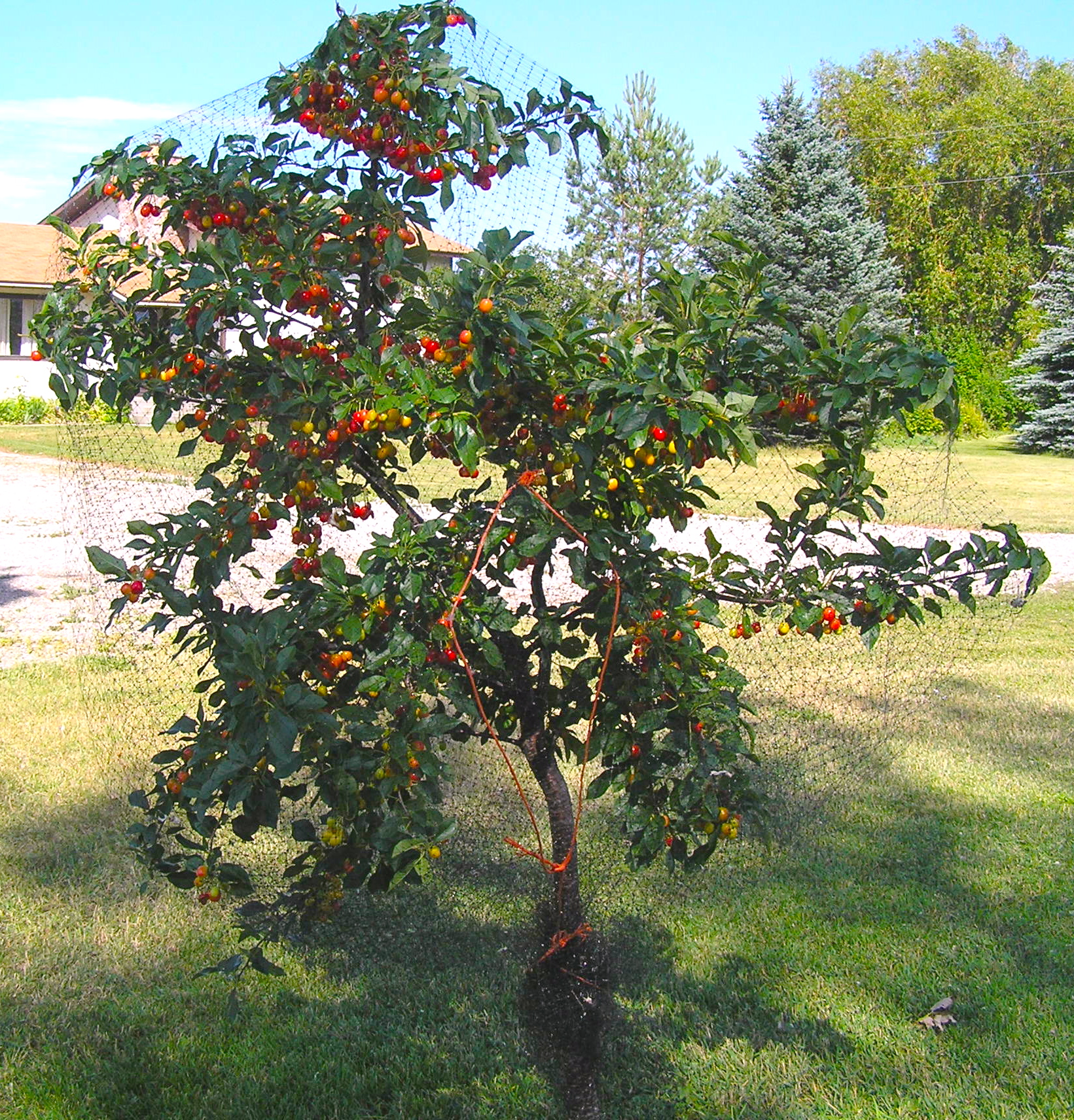
- A young Evans Cherry tree growing in Montana, with ripening cherries
- Genus: Prunus
- Species: P. cerasus
- Cultivar: 'Evans', also known as 'Bali'
- Origin: Alberta, Canada, 1923 or earlier

The Evans Cherry also sold under the name 'Bali', is a sour cherry (Prunus cerasus) cultivar rediscovered in an old orchard near Edmonton, Alberta, Canada. Cherries had not been considered viable in the harsh climate of the Canadian prairies, yet the specimen, discovered by Ieuan Evans, had been growing there since the 1920s. Grown on its own rootstock and self-pollinating, the Evans Cherry displays white blossoms in spring and bears abundant fruit.

Evans once thought the cherry originated in Minnesota, but according to more recent reports, he believes it may have come from Alaska where Evans Cherry trees were given out to settlers.

== Characteristics ==
The Evans Cherry cultivar grows from 12 to 14 feet (3.7 to 4.3 m) – other sour cherries are taller – with abundant white blossoms in spring, bright red fruit at an average weight of 0.15 ounces (4.4 grams), and juice that is pink-tinted to clear. The tree can be grown on its own root stock so there are no grafting problems; an advantage, since with grafting there can be incompatibility between the top or shoot and the grafted root stock, or a poor graft union can cause a trunk to split later on as the tree grows larger. Best trained as a tree rather than bush to make harvest of fruit easiest, the Evans Cherry is a self-fruitful, zone 3a cherry with a ripening season in North America in August.

== History ==
Ieuan Evans, who is a horticulturist, and was a specialist in plant disease and a research scientist for Alberta Agriculture, discovered a gardener, identified as "Mrs Bower," living northeast of Edmonton near Fort Saskatchewan, who had been growing cherry trees that bore abundant fruit dating back to 1923. The orchard, though, was about to be destroyed to make room to build a Federal jail, so Bower invited Evans to take some of the orchard's trees both for the Alberta Tree Nursery and for his personal use. Evans discovered suckers from the cherry trees were easy to propagate and to grow so he distributed them to a wide circle of acquaintances and friends. Response from those growing the vigorous tree with its excellent fruit was very positive. However at that time, nurseries refused to sell the now-named Evans Cherry tree believing, despite the evidence, that cherries would not grow on the Canadian prairies. Eventually, nurseries like the DNA Gardens near Red Deer, Alberta began propagation and selling the trees. Later, a Winnipeg Manitoba nursery began selling thousands of the trees, and at present they sell out every year. The tree, now in the public domain, has been sold as cuttings as well as having been tissue cultured in parts of Canada and the United States.

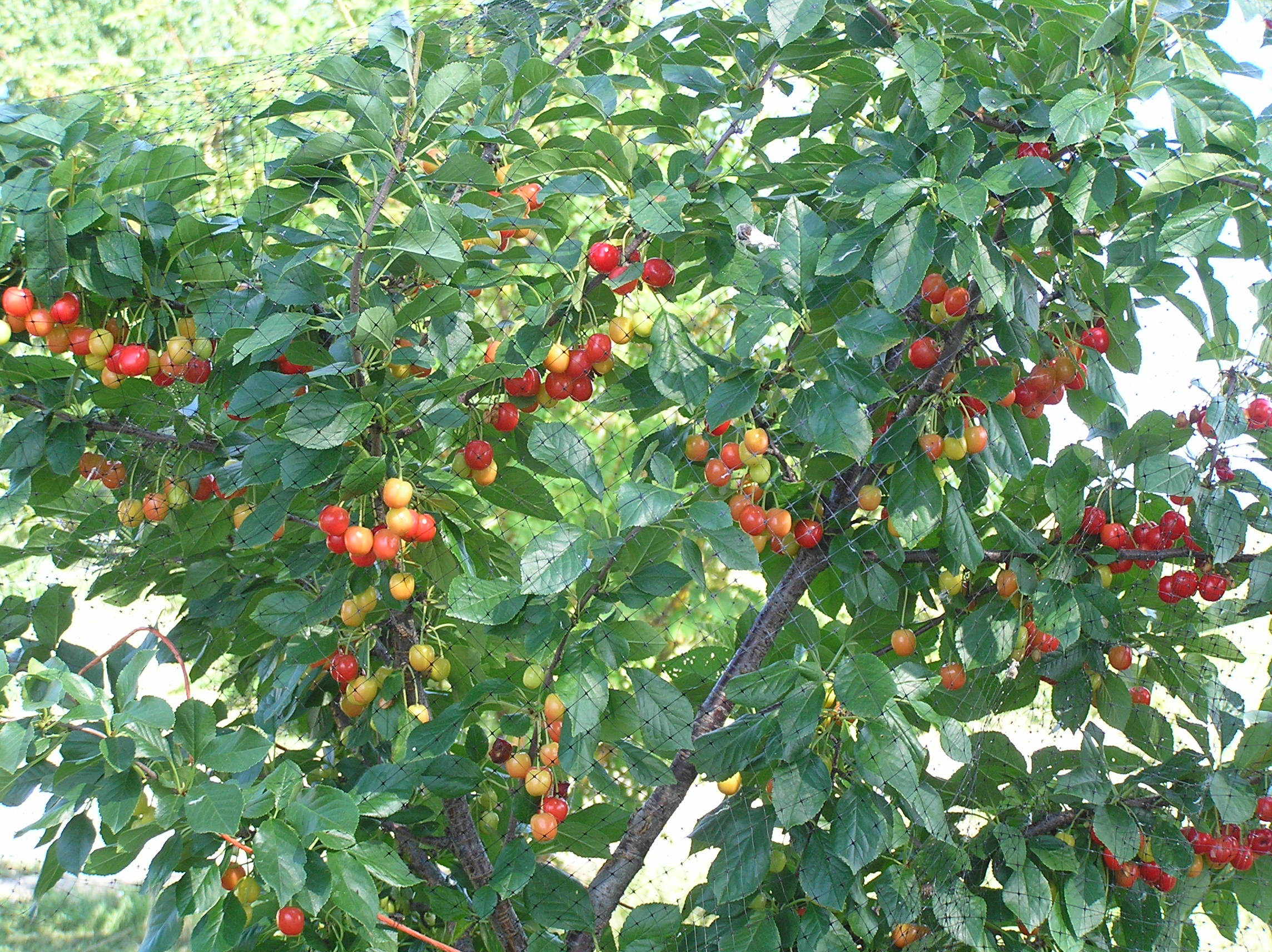
Ripening fruit
