= Cherry cake =

Cherry cake may refer to any cake containing cherries:

- a traditional British pound cake featuring glacé cherries in a Madeira sponge
- Black Forest gateau, a traditional German chocolate cake with cherry filling
- Gâteau Basque, a traditional Basque French pastry filled with black cherry jam

== See also ==
- Cherri M. Pancake
- List of cherry dishes
