= List of cherry dishes =

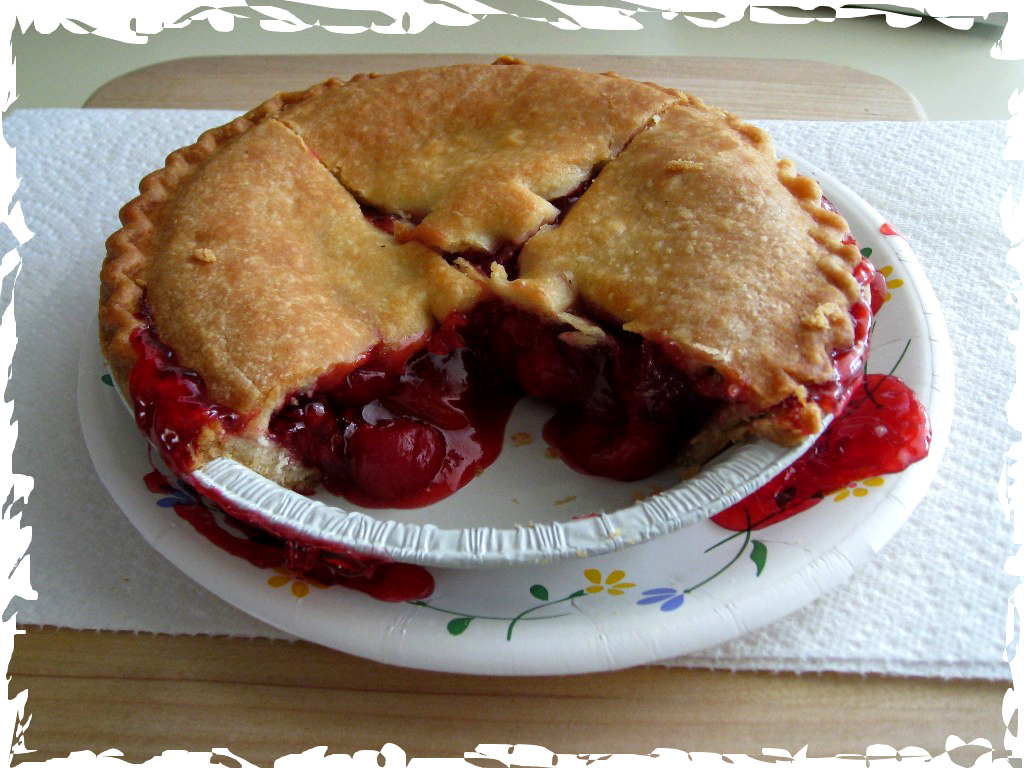
A cherry pie

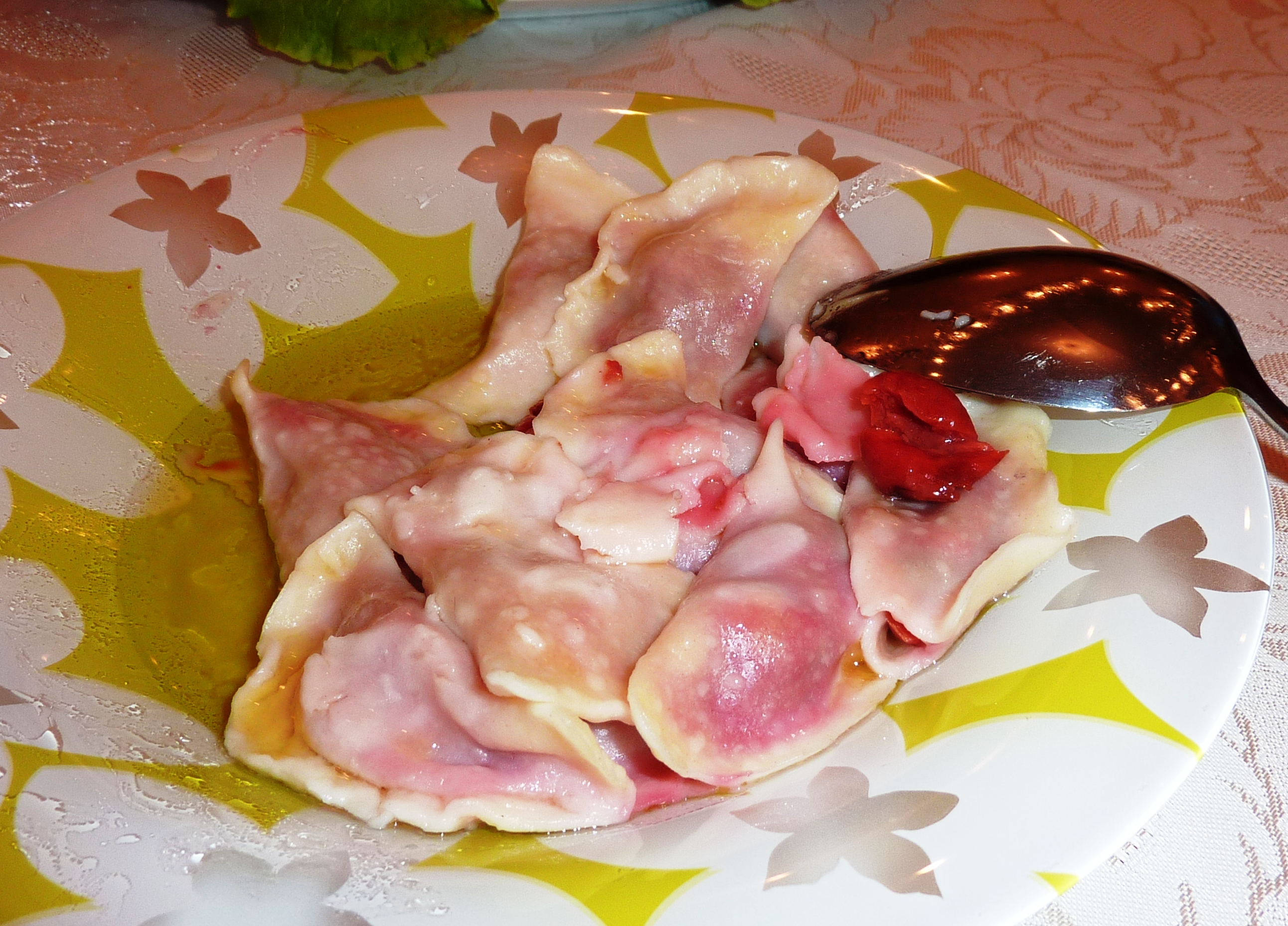
Ukrainian cherry varenyky

This is a list of notable cherry dishes and foods that are prepared with cherries as a main ingredient.

== Cherry dishes and foods ==
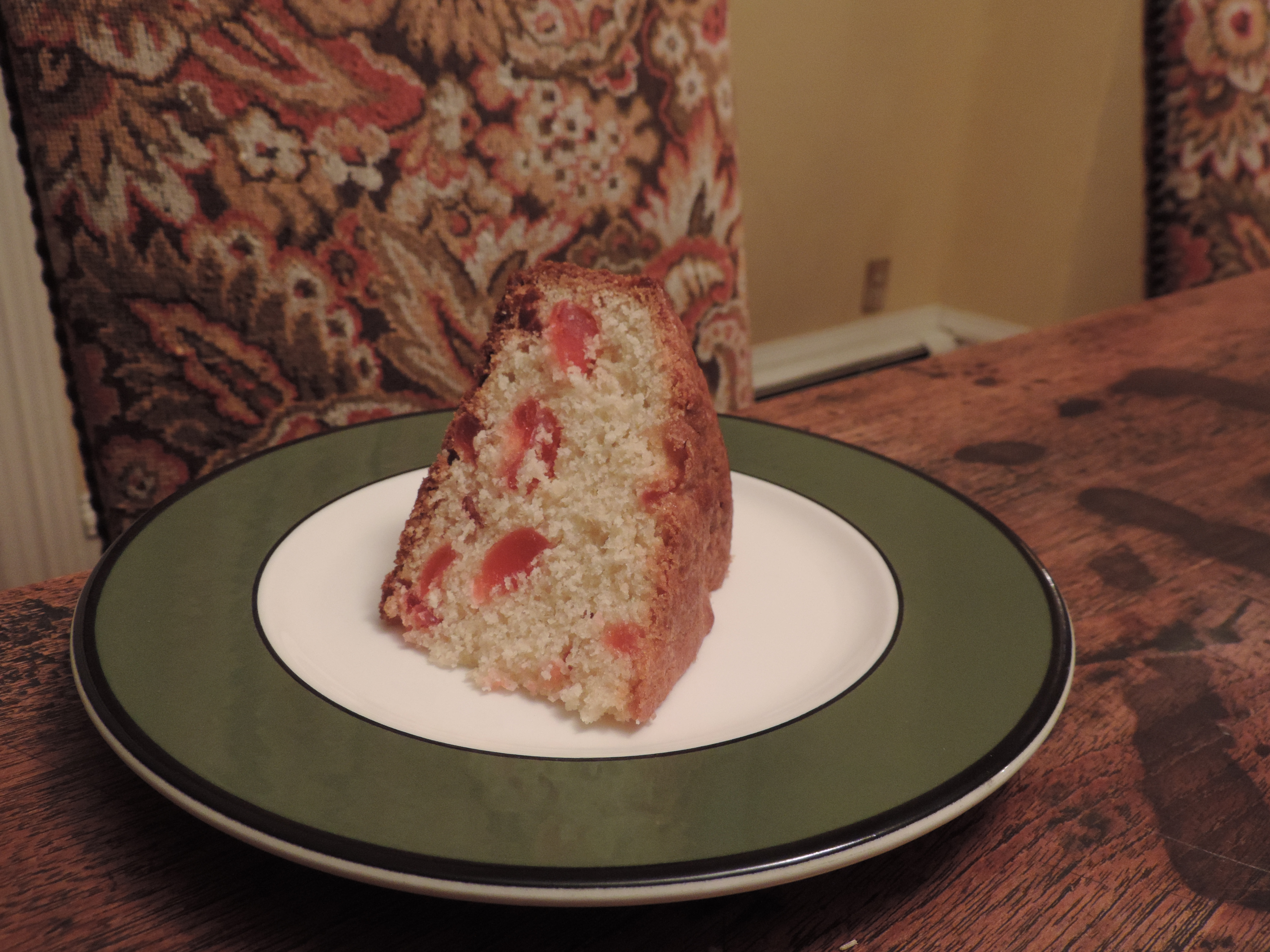
A slice of British cherry cake

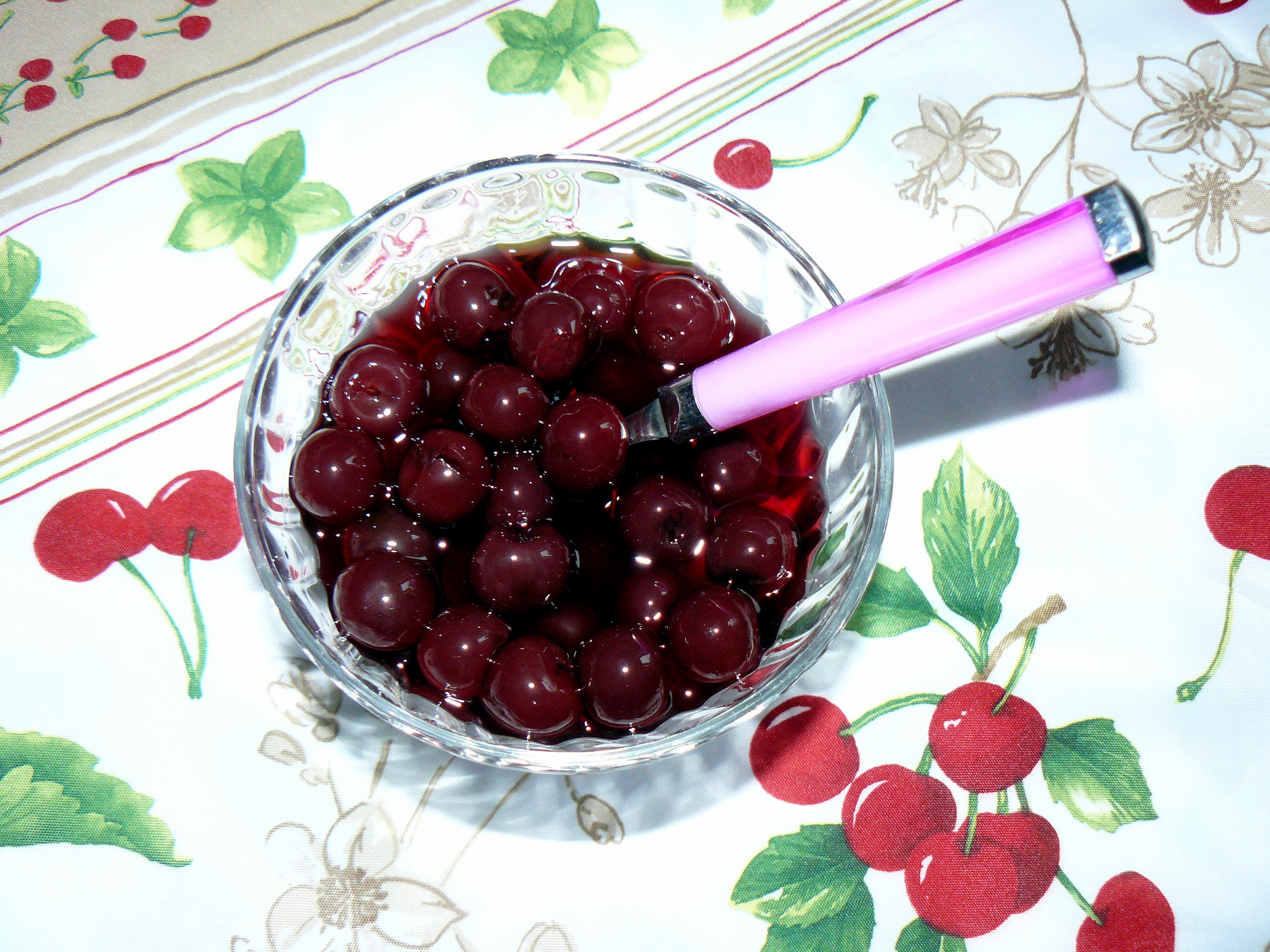
Griottines de Fougerolles (cherries macerated in eau-de-vie)

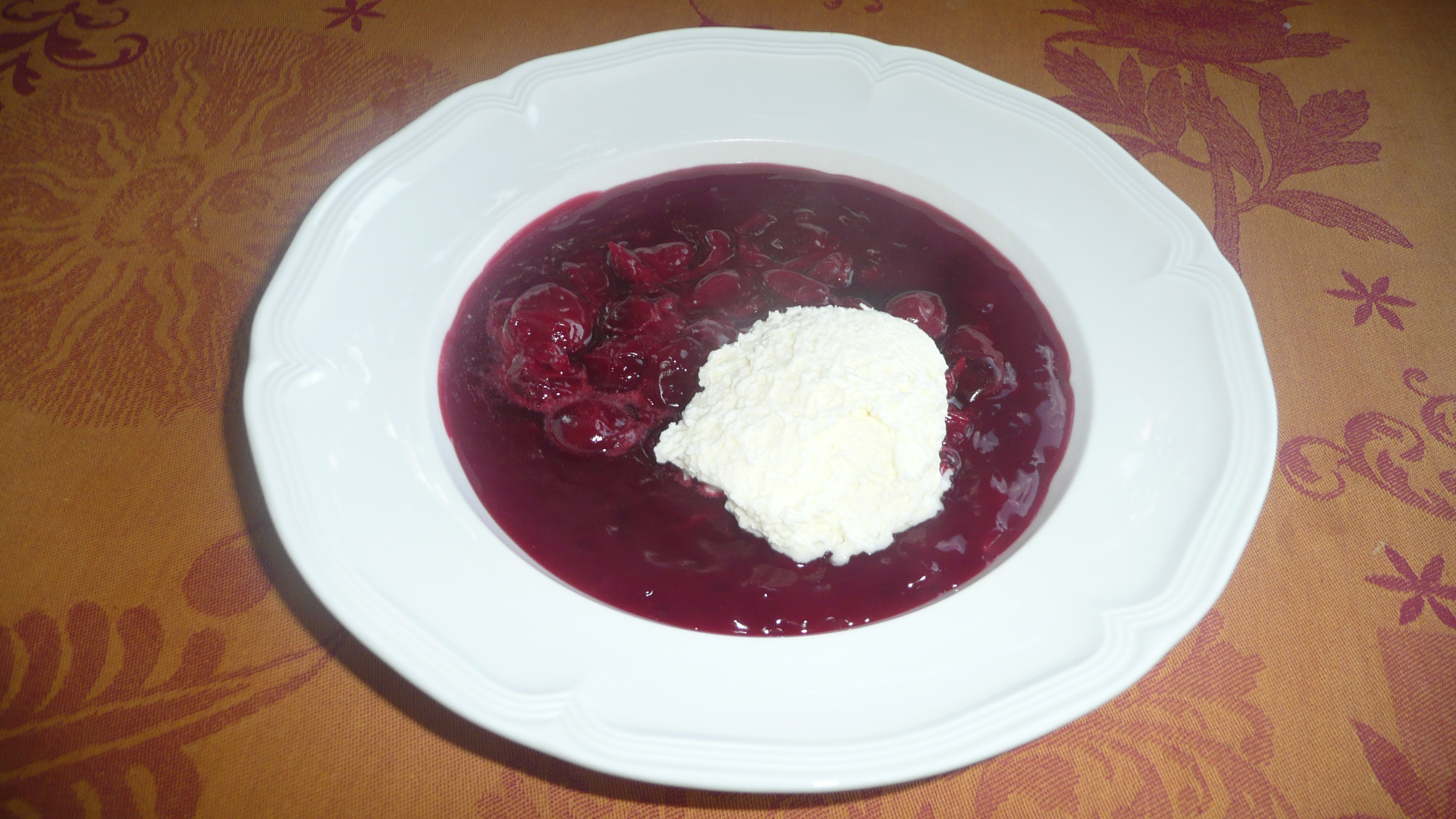
Sour cherry soup in Budapest, Hungary

- Black Forest gateau – a chocolate sponge cake with a rich cherry filling based on the German dessert Schwarzwälder Kirschtorte, literally "Black Forest Cherry-torte".
- Cherpumple – a novelty dish where several different flavor pies are baked inside of several different flavors of cake and stacked together. According to the Cherpumple's creator, pop culture humorist Charles Phoenix, "Cherpumple is short for cherry, pumpkin and apple pie. The apple pie is baked in spice cake, the pumpkin in yellow and the cherry in white."
- Cherry Blossom – a chocolate bar in Canada produced by Hershey Canada Inc. Hershey used to produce it at its Canadian manufacturing facility in Smiths Falls, Ontario. It was discontinued in 2025.
- Cherry cake – a traditional British cake that consists of glacé cherries evenly suspended within a Madeira sponge.
- Cherry ice cream – ice cream flavored with cherries. Cherry juice is also sometimes used in its production. Cherry ice cream has been mass-produced in the United States since at least 1917.
- Cherry juice
- Cherries jubilee – a dessert dish made with cherries and brandy (typically Kirschwasser), which is subsequently flambéed, and commonly served as a sauce over vanilla ice cream
- Cherry Mash - a candy bar consisting of a soft, cherry-flavored center containing maraschino cherries, covered in a mixture of chopped roasted peanuts and chocolate
- Cherry pie – a pie baked with a cherry filling
- Cherry Ripe – a chocolate bar brand manufactured by Cadbury Australia. It was introduced by the Australian confectioner MacRobertson's in 1924. It is now Australia's oldest chocolate bar and one of the top chocolate bar brands sold in the country.
- Chocolate-covered cherry – a dessert confection that is mass-produced and also prepared in homemade versions
- Clafoutis – a French (specifically from Limousin) dessert where black cherries are arranged in a buttered dish and baked in a batter. They are served tepid.
- Dried cherry – cherries that have been preserved by drying. Michigan salad is a dish that uses dried cherries as a main ingredient.
- Gâteau Basque – a traditional dessert from the Northern Basque region of France, typically filled with black cherry jam or pastry cream.
- Griottines – cherries macerated in eau de vie or kirsch, common to Fougerolles (Haute-Saône) in Franche-Comté, eastern France.
- Kirschenmichel – a traditional German pudding dessert especially popular in the regions Palatinate, Baden-Württemberg, South Bavaria, Franconia and the southern part of Hesse. The dish consists of aged bread, butter, milk, eggs and sugar that are made into a dough, after which sweet or sour cherries are folded into the dough and the mixture is baked in a casserole dish.
- Mahleb – an aromatic spice made from the seeds of a species of cherry, Prunus mahaleb. It is used in small quantities to sharpen sweet foods and cakes, and is used in production of tresse cheese.
- Maraschino cherry – a preserved, sweetened cherry, typically made from light-colored sweet cherries such as the Royal Ann, Rainier, or Gold varieties.
- Sour cherry soup – Originating in Hungarian cuisine, this soup is a summer specialty in several European cuisines. It is a mildly sweet soup made with sour cream, sugar and whole fresh sour cherries, and is served chilled.
- Varenyky with cherry - one of the national Ukrainian dishes, it is sweet and served with smetana.

== See also ==
- List of fruit dishes
