= Cherry Blossom (candy) =

Canadian brand of confectionery

- Product type: Bonbon
- Current owner: Hershey
- Produced by: Hershey (2008-2025)
- Country: Canada
- Introduced: 1890s
- Previous owners: Lowney Company

Cherry Blossom was a type of chocolate confection originally produced by the Lowney Company before being taken over by Hershey Canada. It was discontinued in 2025.

The Cherry Blossom consisted of a maraschino cherry and cherry syrup surrounded by a mixture of chocolate, shredded coconut and roasted peanut pieces. Cherry Blossoms were packaged in yellow boxes. Contrary to common myth, filling was not injected inside the chocolate. The cherry candy was coated with an enzyme, invertase, that would break down the solid into a liquid over the next 1 to 2 weeks.

== History ==
The candy had been manufactured since the 1890s by the Walter M. Lowney Company of Canada. A prominent man in Mansfield, Massachusetts, Lowney opened and operated his candy factory in the city, being also involved in the development of other interests in the city. In the mid 1890s a subsidiary of Lowney Co. was opened in Canada. The company continued to grow and so did the Cherry Blossom.

The Walter M. Lowney Company of Canada was later acquired by Standard Brands in 1968, and Lowney became a division of Standard Brands. In 1981, Nabisco and Standard Brands Ltd merged to form a new entity, which now owned the Lowney division. Finally, Hershey Canada purchased the candy unit of Nabisco in 1987, which included Lowney.

The Lowney manufacturing plant resided in the city of Sherbrooke, Quebec up until 1989, at which time it was closed, and all Lowney chocolate manufacturing was moved to an existing Hershey plant in Smiths Falls, Ontario. The facility in Smiths Falls, northeast of Kingston, later closed in 2012. In January 2025, Hershey announced that they were discontinuing Cherry Blossoms. Shortly afterwards, some grocery stores reported a noticeable increase in sales of the product. By September 2025, most retailers had sold their remaining stock of Cherry Blossoms, which led to resellers selling the candy at a significant markup online.

== See also ==
- List of chocolate bar brands
- List of cherry dishes
- No Name (brand)
