= Saint-Valbert =

Commune in Haute-Saône, France

- Part of Fougerolles-Saint-Valbert
- Location of Saint-Valbert
- Location within France Location within Bourgogne-Franche-Comté
- Coordinates: 47°51′12″N 6°23′48″E
- Country: France
- Region: Bourgogne-Franche-Comté
- Department: Haute-Saône
- Arrondissement: Lure
- Canton: Luxeuil-les-Bains
- Commune: Fougerolles-Saint-Valbert
- Area^{1}: 3.90 km^{2} (1.51 sq mi)
- Highest elevation: 418 m (1,371 ft)
- Lowest elevation: 283 m (928 ft)
- Population (2022): 248
  - Density: 63.6/km^{2} (165/sq mi)
- Time zone: UTC+01:00 (CET)
  - Summer (DST): UTC+02:00 (CEST)
- Postal code: 70300
- ^{1} French Land Register data, which excludes lakes, ponds, glaciers > 1 km^{2} (0.386 sq mi or 247 acres) and river estuaries.

Saint-Valbert (French pronunciation: [sɛ̃ valbɛʁ]) is a former commune in the Haute-Saône department in the region of Bourgogne-Franche-Comté in eastern France. On 1 January 2019, it was merged into the new commune Fougerolles-Saint-Valbert.

== See also ==
- Communes of the Haute-Saône department
