= La Chapelle-lès-Luxeuil =

- Commune
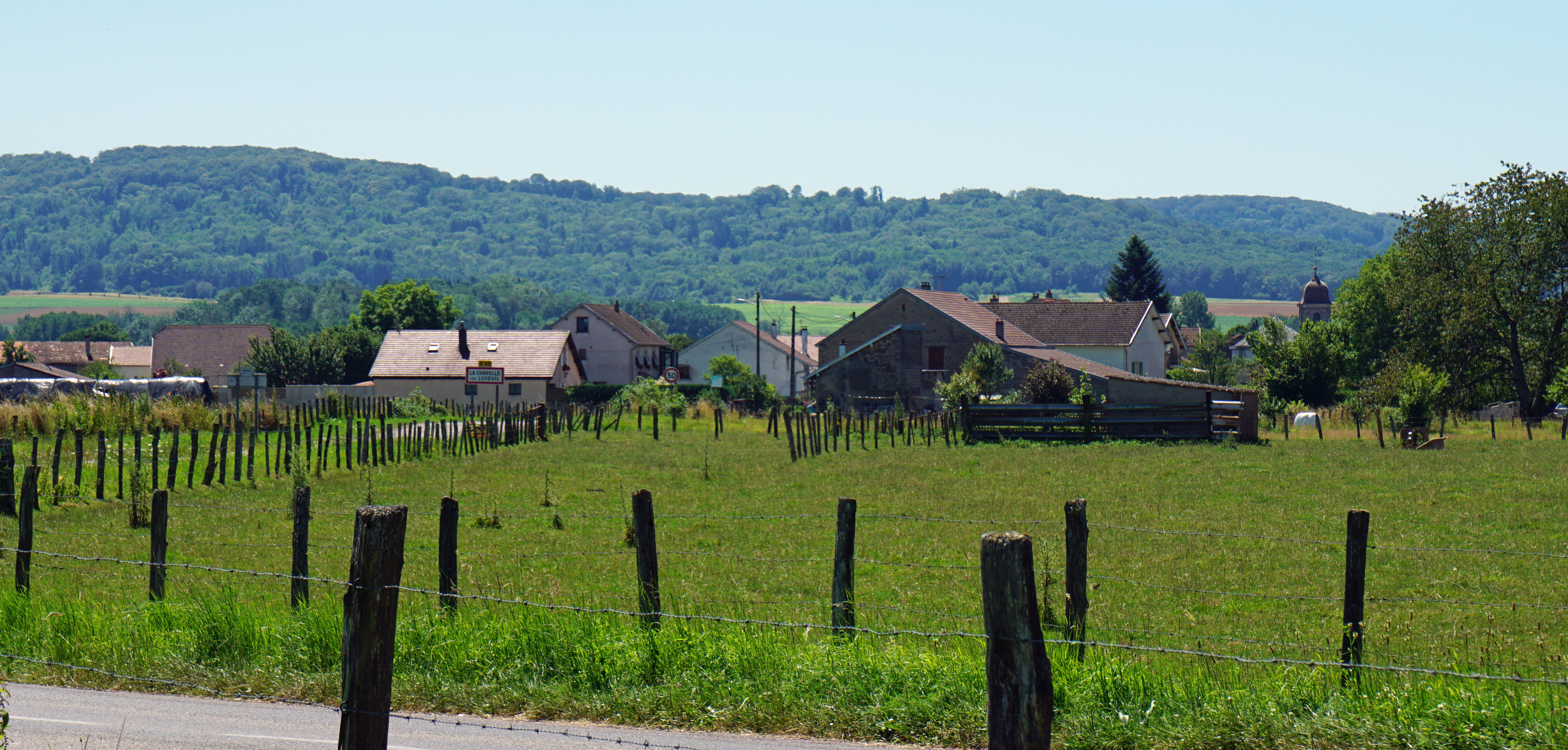
- A general view of La Chapelle-lès-Luxeuil
- Location of La Chapelle-lès-Luxeuil
- Location within France Location within Bourgogne-Franche-Comté
- Coordinates: 47°46′19″N 6°22′03″E
- Country: France
- Region: Bourgogne-Franche-Comté
- Department: Haute-Saône
- Arrondissement: Lure
- Canton: Luxeuil-les-Bains

Government
  - Mayor (2020–2026): Alain Schelle
- Area^{1}: 7.69 km^{2} (2.97 sq mi)
- Highest elevation: 310 m (1,020 ft)
- Lowest elevation: 260 m (850 ft)
- Population (2023): 380
  - Density: 49/km^{2} (130/sq mi)
- Time zone: UTC+01:00 (CET)
  - Summer (DST): UTC+02:00 (CEST)
- INSEE/Postal code: 70128 /70300
- ^{1} French Land Register data, which excludes lakes, ponds, glaciers > 1 km^{2} (0.386 sq mi or 247 acres) and river estuaries.

La Chapelle-lès-Luxeuil (French pronunciation: [la ʃapɛl lɛ lyksœj], lit. 'La Chapelle near Luxeuil') is a commune in the Haute-Saône department in the region of Bourgogne-Franche-Comté in eastern France.

== See also ==
- Communes of the Haute-Saône department
