= Dried cherry =

Type of dried fruit

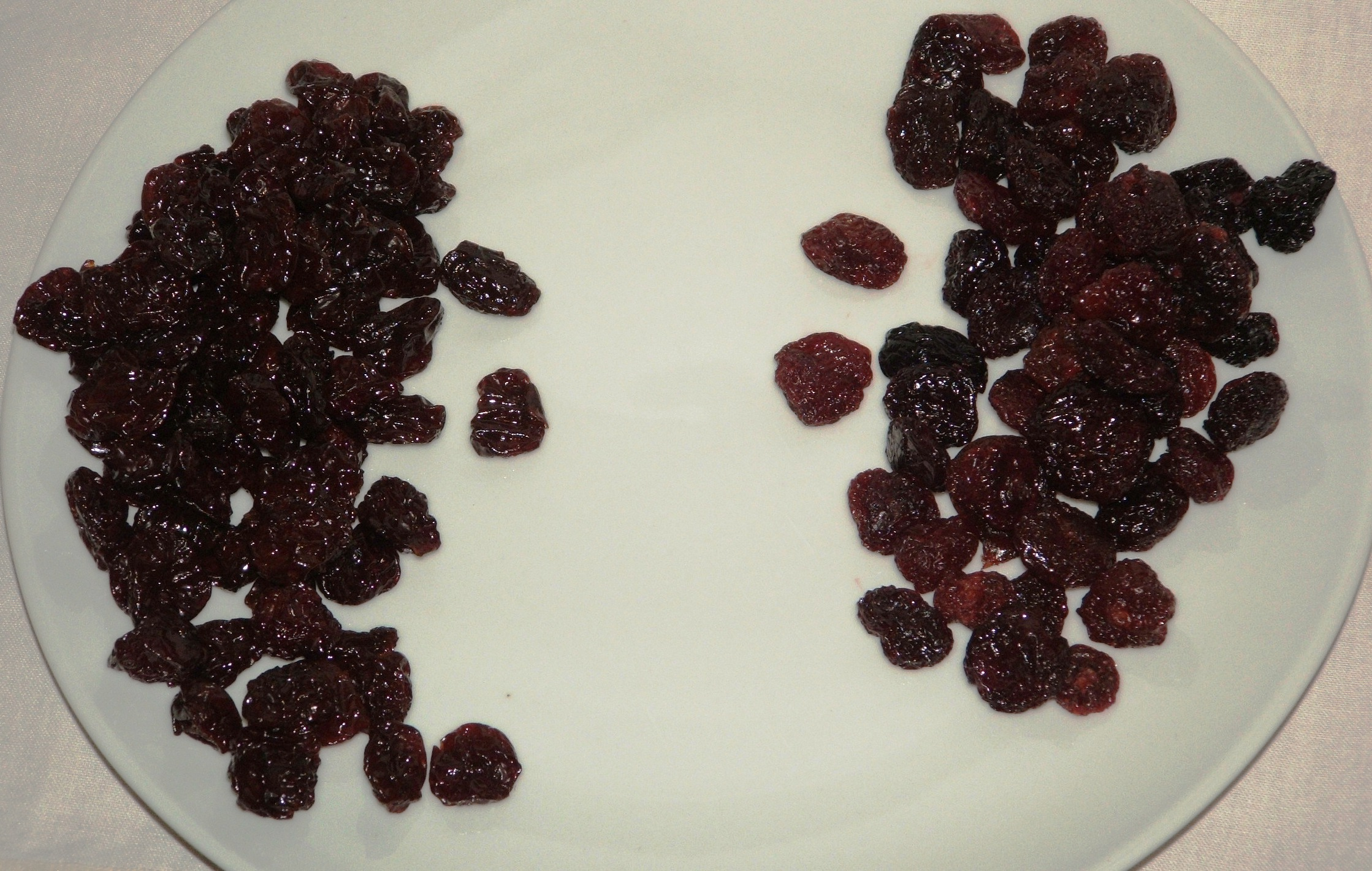
Dried cherries - Montmorency (left) and Bing (right)

Dried cherries are a type of dried fruit. They consist of cherries which have been subjected to a drying process.

== Production ==
One method for industrial production of dried cherries involves first dipping them in a boiling 0.5–2% solution of sodium carbonate (NaCO_{3}) for up to 20 seconds, and then rinsing in cool water; this induces small cracks in the skin and speeds up the drying process. Some other possible materials for the dipping solution include ethyl oleate and oleyl alcohol; adding alkalis like potassium carbonate (K_{2}CO_{3}) to such a dip was shown to have no positive effect on drying time. Such results had already been demonstrated in scientific research by the 1940s. Dried cherries might also be produced by freeze drying or air drying. After drying, they typically have a moisture content of around 25%. Adding sulfur dioxide (SO_{2}) may help to improve color and flavour retention over long periods of storage.

Sweet varieties recommended for drying include Lambert, Royal Ann, Napoleon, Van, or Bing; tart varieties recommended for drying include Early Richmond or Large Montmorency. Most cherries sold in North America are sour varieties (either Montmorency or Morello). The first recorded experiments attempting to dry Montmorency tart cherries were performed in the late 1970s by professors at Utah State University. After drying the cherries, they were rolled in sugar and then sampled as "snow cherries".

== Culinary uses ==
People of the Crow Nation often use finely ground dried cherries in production of pemmican.

== Medicinal value ==
As far back as ancient times, Pliny the Elder had recognised that dried cherries have a diuretic effect; he mentioned them briefly in his description of medicinal plants found in books XX-XXVII of the Naturalis Historia.

== See also ==
- List of cherry dishes
- List of dried foods
