= Twin Bing =

Cherry, peanut, and chocolate candy

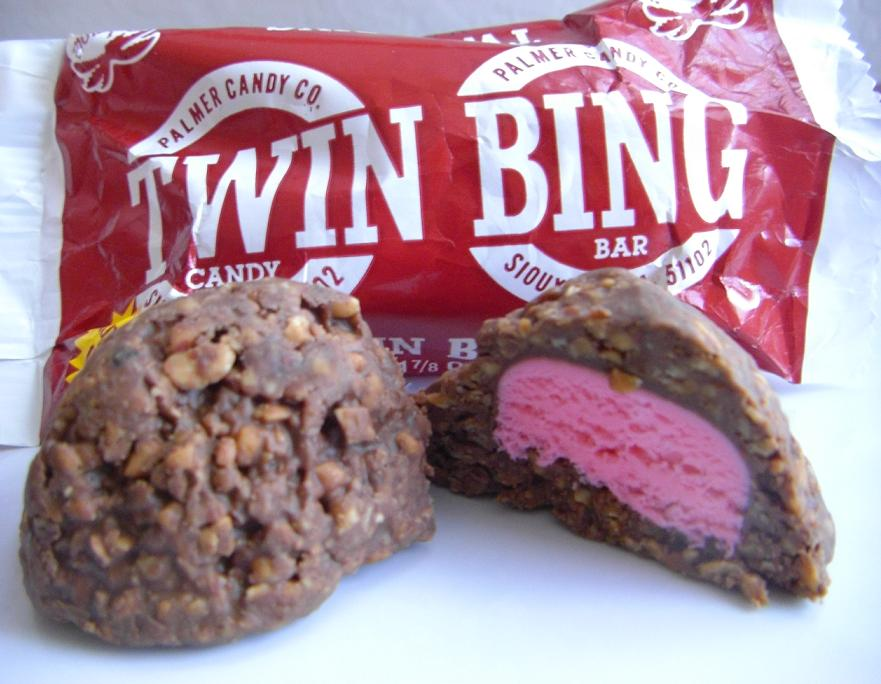
A Twin Bing

The Twin Bing is a candy bar made by the Palmer Candy Company of Sioux City, Iowa. It consists of two round, chewy, cherry-flavored nougats coated with a mixture of chopped peanuts and chocolate. The company also produces individual Bings, as well as the King Bing, a package of three. The Twin Bing was introduced in the 1960s, possibly in 1969, according to Marty Palmer, the 5th-generation president of the Palmer Candy Company, and has been called "one of Sioux City's quintessential treats".

== History ==
The original Bing was introduced in 1923. The Bing originally came in four flavors: cherry, pineapple, vanilla, and maple. It is still made by hand today. Sometime in the 1920s to 1930s, the candy bar was released in a "Crow Bar" package that included trading cards featuring film stars. Marty Palmer himself was only vaguely aware that trading cards had been packaged with one of Palmer's candy bars until someone sent him copies of the cards. Comprising more than 100 cards, the series included actors such as Mary Astor and Charlie Chaplin.

Bings were sold singly until the 1960s, when a second bar was added, likely in 1969, according to Marty Palmer. As the cost of ingredients rose, candy companies initially reduced the sizes of their candy bars, then later increased the price, formerly a nickel, to a dime. With the higher price, the Palmer Company decided to increase the size of Bing candy bars. However, a larger single Bing would have been problematic in vending machines, because of the candy bar's unusual shape. Palmer said of the name change and additional Bing, "Some clever person here, I don't know who, came up with the idea you could put two together and make it a twin", and that the name change was "natural". The altered name also had an effect of increasing interest.

According to Marty Palmer, parents of newborn twins give out Twin Bings, and fans of the Minnesota Twins are known to request them often.

Grocery store chain Hy-Vee built a display of over 15,000 Bing bars of all types in 2001 as a response to Palmer Candy Company's March Madness promotion. The current owner showed his creation in the 2004 National Confectioners Association's All Candy Expo. In 2014, a Twin Bing ice cream was created when the NAIA basketball tournament came to Sioux City, at the Tyson Events Center.

== Description ==
The inside of a Twin Bing is a mixture of nougat and fondant, which combines into a cream. Author Steve Almond described the candy as "two brown lumps, about the size of golf balls, roughly textured, and stuck to one another like Siamese twins". Almond also stated that his favorite candy bar is the Twin Bing. William Grimes, the author of Eating Your Words, wrote that the Twin Bing "narrowly beats out the Idaho Spud as the strangest candy bar still in production". The Twin Bing was listed among ten candy bars in an article from Chowhound titled "Candy Bars Worth Crossing State Lines For". The article describes the Twin Bing as "Two brown-gold balls of sweet cherry cream covered with crushed peanuts and chocolate". The Sioux City Journal, which refers to the candy as "one of Sioux City's quintessential treats", noted in 2016 that a bar in a local hotel makes a signature drink with the Twin Bing: the "Twin Bing Martini" contains Godiva Chocolate Liqueur, cherry-flavored Dr. McGillicuddy's, Frangelico, and splashes of Coca-Cola and grenadine.

=== Ingredients ===
Sugar, peanuts, corn syrup, hydrogenated palm kernel oil, cocoa powder, whey, invert sugar, salt, egg whites, soy lecithin, artificial flavors, FD&C Red 3, FD&C Red 40, citric acid, invertase, cream of tartar.

== See also ==
- Cherry Mash, a similar candy with cherries ground and mixed in the nougat
- Big Cherry, a similar candy with a cherry inside the nougat
- Twix, another brand of twinned confectionery
