= Brotte-lès-Luxeuil =

- Commune
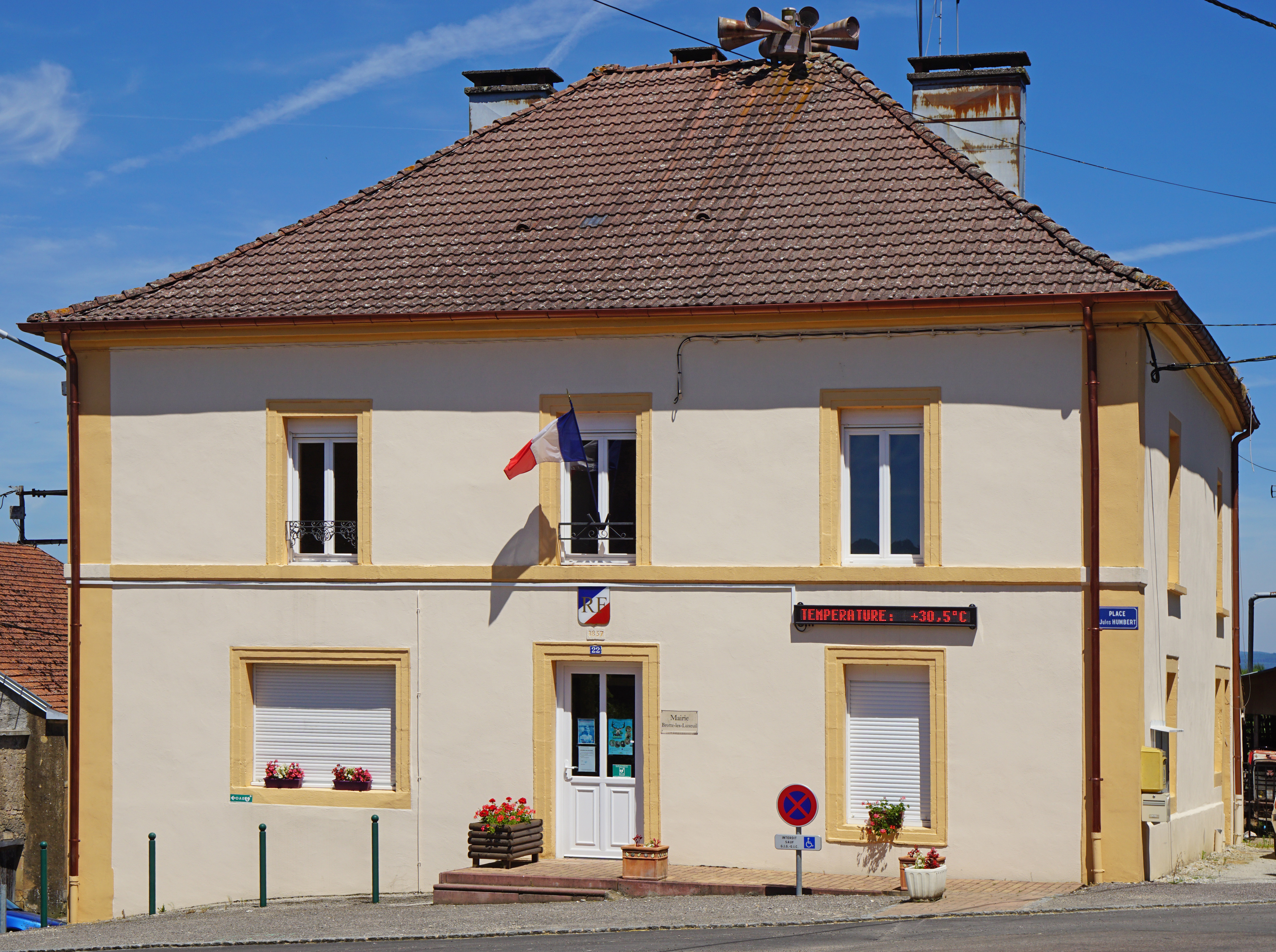
- The town hall in Brotte-lès-Luxeuil

- Coat of arms
- Location of Brotte-lès-Luxeuil
- Location within France Location within Bourgogne-Franche-Comté
- Coordinates: 47°45′27″N 6°20′55″E
- Country: France
- Region: Bourgogne-Franche-Comté
- Department: Haute-Saône
- Arrondissement: Lure
- Canton: Luxeuil-les-Bains

Government
  - Mayor (2020–2026): Bernard Gire
- Area^{1}: 6.87 km^{2} (2.65 sq mi)
- Highest elevation: 450 m (1,480 ft)
- Lowest elevation: 261 m (856 ft)
- Population (2023): 194
  - Density: 28.2/km^{2} (73.1/sq mi)
- Time zone: UTC+01:00 (CET)
  - Summer (DST): UTC+02:00 (CEST)
- INSEE/Postal code: 70098 /70300
- ^{1} French Land Register data, which excludes lakes, ponds, glaciers > 1 km^{2} (0.386 sq mi or 247 acres) and river estuaries.

Brotte-lès-Luxeuil (French pronunciation: [bʁɔt lɛ lyksœj], literally Brotte near Luxeuil) is a commune in the Haute-Saône department in the region of Bourgogne-Franche-Comté in eastern France.

== See also ==
- Communes of the Haute-Saône department
