= Ailloncourt =

- Commune
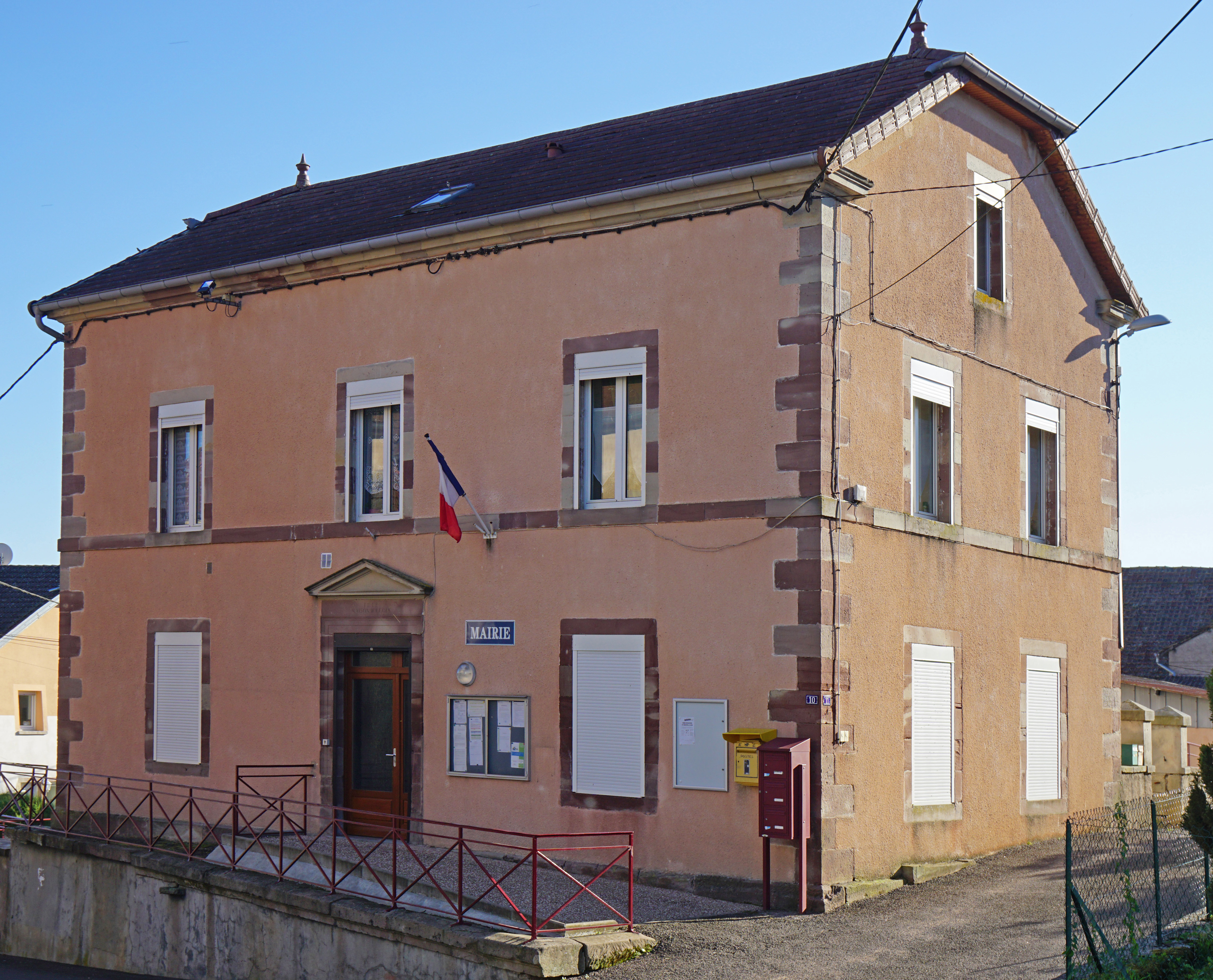
- The town hall in Ailloncourt

- Coat of arms
- Location of Ailloncourt
- Location within France Location within Bourgogne-Franche-Comté
- Coordinates: 47°45′22″N 6°23′20″E
- Country: France
- Region: Bourgogne-Franche-Comté
- Department: Haute-Saône
- Arrondissement: Lure
- Canton: Luxeuil-les-Bains
- Intercommunality: Triangle Vert

Government
  - Mayor (2020–2026): Véronique Ambert-Grandjean
- Area^{1}: 9.29 km^{2} (3.59 sq mi)
- Highest elevation: 450 m (1,480 ft)
- Lowest elevation: 264 m (866 ft)
- Population (2023): 305
  - Density: 32.8/km^{2} (85.0/sq mi)
- Time zone: UTC+01:00 (CET)
  - Summer (DST): UTC+02:00 (CEST)
- INSEE/Postal code: 70007 /70300
- ^{1} French Land Register data, which excludes lakes, ponds, glaciers > 1 km^{2} (0.386 sq mi or 247 acres) and river estuaries.

Ailloncourt (French pronunciation: [ajɔ̃kuʁ]) is a commune in the Haute-Saône department in the region of Bourgogne-Franche-Comté in eastern France.

== Population ==
Historical population
| Year | Pop. | ±% p.a. |
|---|---|---|
| 1968 | 198 | — |
| 1975 | 151 | −3.80% |
| 1982 | 223 | +5.73% |
| 1990 | 225 | +0.11% |
| 1999 | 224 | −0.05% |
| 2007 | 278 | +2.74% |
| 2012 | 324 | +3.11% |
| 2017 | 302 | −1.40% |
| 2023 | 305 | +0.16% |
Source: INSEE

== See also ==
- Communes of the Haute-Saône department
