= Saint-Sauveur, Haute-Saône =

Saint-Sauveur
- Commune
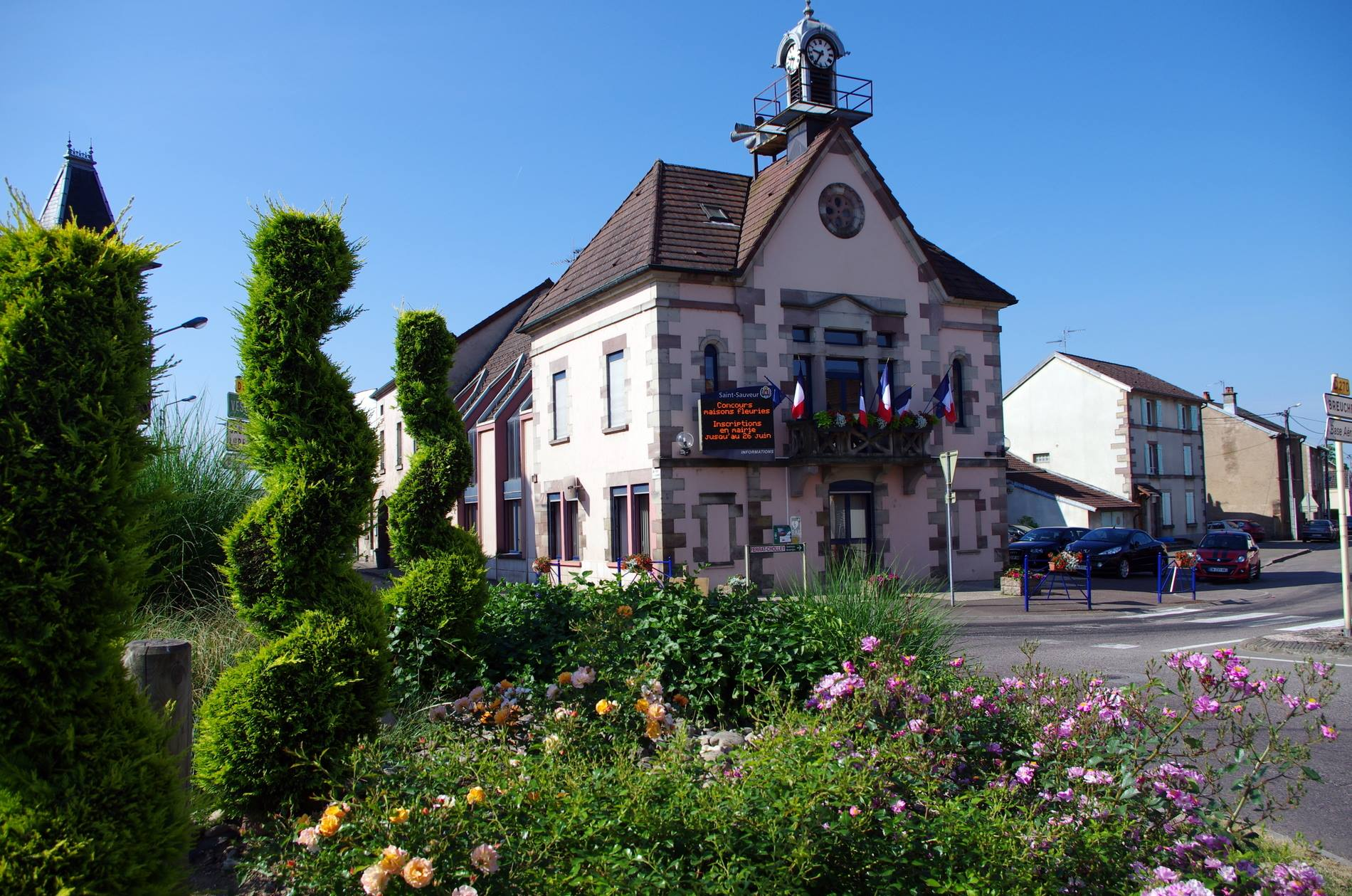
- The town hall in Saint-Sauveur

- Coat of arms
- Location of Saint-Sauveur
- Location within France Location within Bourgogne-Franche-Comté
- Coordinates: 47°48′16″N 6°23′07″E
- Country: France
- Region: Bourgogne-Franche-Comté
- Department: Haute-Saône
- Arrondissement: Lure
- Canton: Luxeuil-les-Bains

Government
  - Mayor (2020–2026): Jacques Deshayes
- Area^{1}: 12.02 km^{2} (4.64 sq mi)
- Highest elevation: 304 m (997 ft)
- Lowest elevation: 268 m (879 ft)
- Population (2023): 1,920
  - Density: 160/km^{2} (414/sq mi)
- Time zone: UTC+01:00 (CET)
  - Summer (DST): UTC+02:00 (CEST)
- INSEE/Postal code: 70473 /70300
- ^{1} French Land Register data, which excludes lakes, ponds, glaciers > 1 km^{2} (0.386 sq mi or 247 acres) and river estuaries.

Saint-Sauveur (French pronunciation: [sɛ̃ sovœʁ]) is a commune in the Haute-Saône department in the region of Bourgogne-Franche-Comté in eastern France.

== See also ==
- Communes of the Haute-Saône department
