= Kirschenmichel =

German dessert

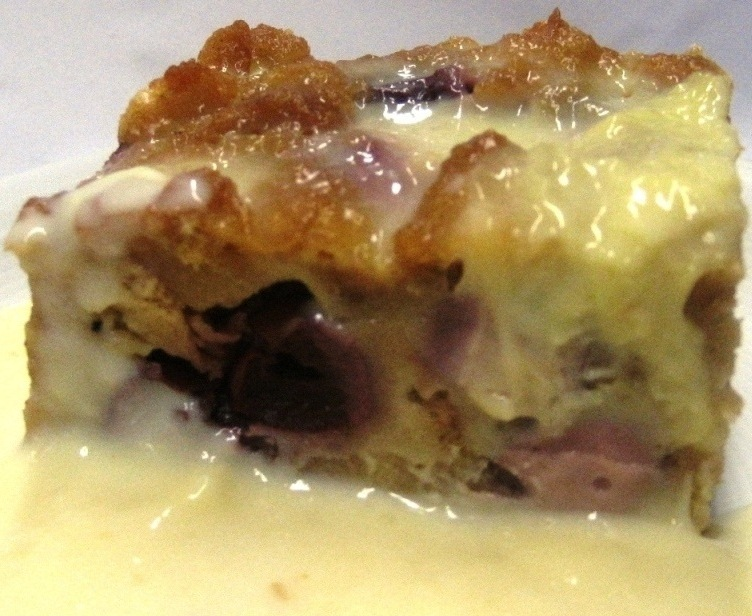
- Kirschenmichel served with vanilla sauce
- Alternative names: Kirschenplotzer, Kerschemischel, Kirschpfanne, Kirschenmännla
- Type: Pudding
- Course: Dessert
- Place of origin: Germany
- Serving temperature: Hot
- Main ingredients: Days-old bread, butter, milk, eggs, sugar, sour cherries

Kirschenmichel (German: [ˈkɪʁʃn̩ˌmɪçl̩]; other names include Kirschenplotzer, Kerschemischel, Kirschpfanne and Kirschenmännla) is a traditional dessert of German cuisine, especially popular in the regions Palatinate, Baden-Württemberg, South Bavaria, Franconia and the southern part of Hesse. It is kind of a pudding and similar to bread pudding and bread and butter pudding.

== Description ==
The dessert consists of bread that is a few days old which is kneaded into a dough with butter, milk, egg and sugar. Sour cherries or sweet cherries are folded into the dough and the mixture is baked in a casserole dish. Prior to serving the dessert is topped with vanilla, cinnamon, almonds and clove and is then served hot with vanilla sauce custard.

Although traditionally a dessert, it can also be found as main dish after an appetizer soup.

A similar dish popular in the south of Germany is Ofenschlupfer which consists of layers of aged bread and apple slices (instead of cherries) which are then soaked in a mixture of butter, sugar and egg. Some also add raisins and serve it with hot vanilla sauce.

== See also ==
- German cuisine
- Bread pudding
- Bread and butter pudding
- List of cherry dishes
- List of German desserts
