= Citers =

- Commune
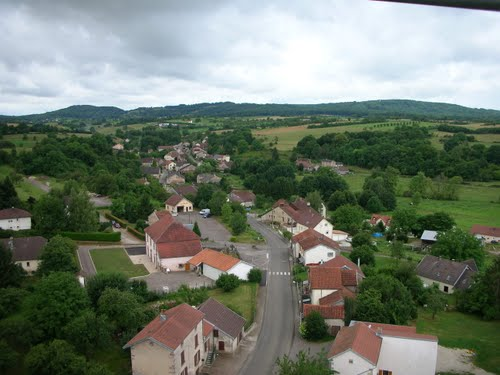
- A general view of Citers
- Location of Citers
- Location within France Location within Bourgogne-Franche-Comté
- Coordinates: 47°44′27″N 6°24′16″E
- Country: France
- Region: Bourgogne-Franche-Comté
- Department: Haute-Saône
- Arrondissement: Lure
- Canton: Luxeuil-les-Bains
- Area^{1}: 15.17 km^{2} (5.86 sq mi)
- Highest elevation: 347 m (1,138 ft)
- Lowest elevation: 269 m (883 ft)
- Population (2023): 765
  - Density: 50.4/km^{2} (131/sq mi)
- Time zone: UTC+01:00 (CET)
  - Summer (DST): UTC+02:00 (CEST)
- INSEE/Postal code: 70155 /70300
- ^{1} French Land Register data, which excludes lakes, ponds, glaciers > 1 km^{2} (0.386 sq mi or 247 acres) and river estuaries.

Citers is a commune in the Haute-Saône department in the region of Bourgogne-Franche-Comté in eastern France.

== See also ==
- Communes of the Haute-Saône department
