= Baudoncourt =

- Commune
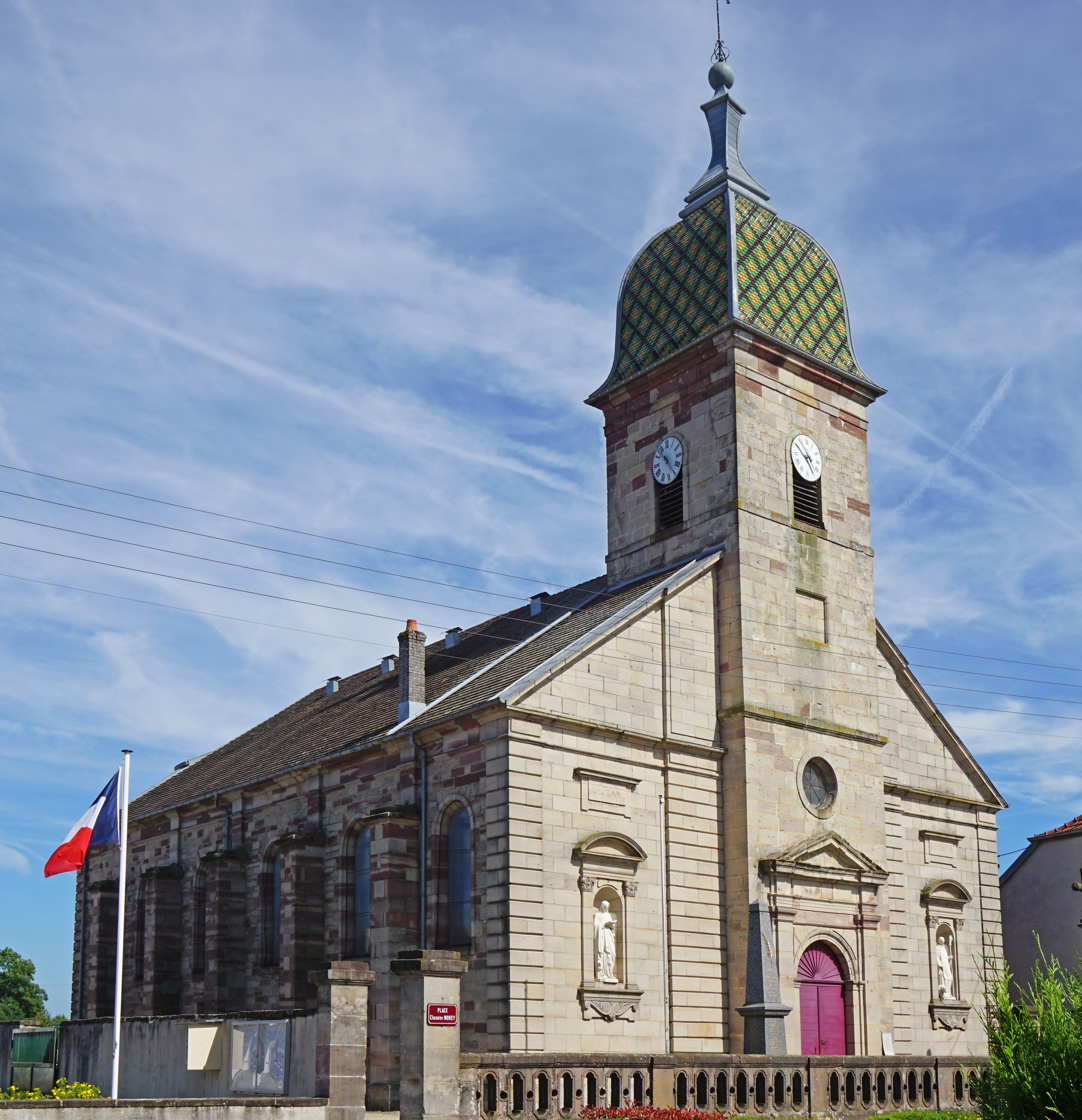
- The church in Baudoncourt
- Location of Baudoncourt
- Location within France Location within Bourgogne-Franche-Comté
- Coordinates: 47°46′43″N 6°20′46″E
- Country: France
- Region: Bourgogne-Franche-Comté
- Department: Haute-Saône
- Arrondissement: Lure
- Canton: Luxeuil-les-Bains

Government
  - Mayor (2020–2026): Gérard Grosjean
- Area^{1}: 7.57 km^{2} (2.92 sq mi)
- Highest elevation: 294 m (965 ft)
- Lowest elevation: 258 m (846 ft)
- Population (2023): 482
  - Density: 63.7/km^{2} (165/sq mi)
- Time zone: UTC+01:00 (CET)
  - Summer (DST): UTC+02:00 (CEST)
- INSEE/Postal code: 70055 /70300
- ^{1} French Land Register data, which excludes lakes, ponds, glaciers > 1 km^{2} (0.386 sq mi or 247 acres) and river estuaries.

Baudoncourt (French pronunciation: [bodɔ̃kuʁ]) is a commune in the Haute-Saône department in the region of Bourgogne-Franche-Comté in eastern France.

== See also ==
- Communes of the Haute-Saône department
