= Sour cherry soup =

Soup originating in Hungarian cuisine

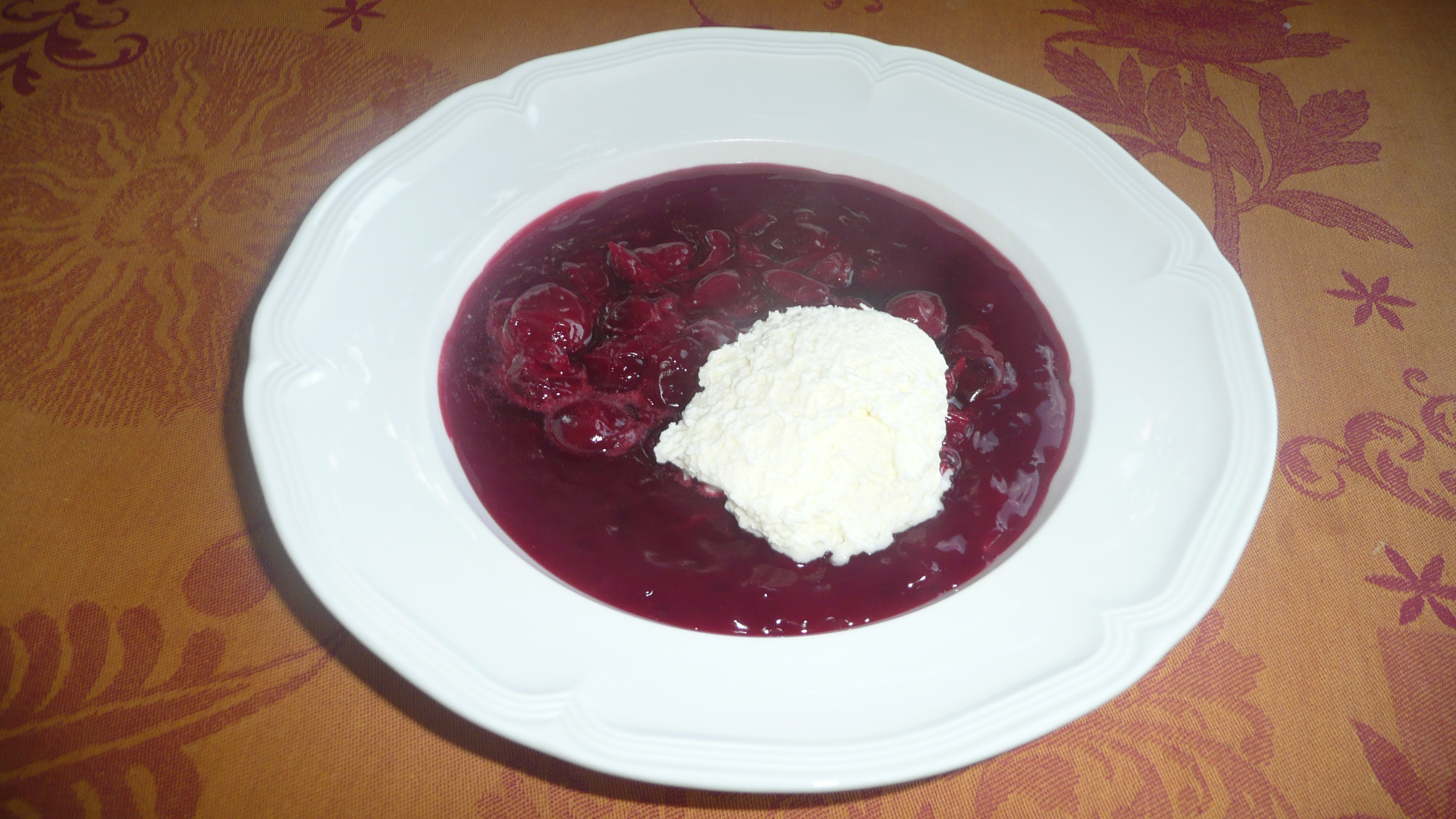
- Type: Soup
- Course: Snack or dessert
- Place of origin: Hungary
- Serving temperature: Cold
- Main ingredients: Sour cherries, sour cream, sugar

Sour cherry soup is a slightly sweet soup made with sour cream, sugar and whole fresh sour cherries, and served chilled. Originating in Hungarian cuisine, this soup is a summer delicacy in several European cuisines.

The dish has been adopted by the Austrians, Poles, Slovaks, and Germans. Hungarian-Americans and Hungarian-Canadians brought the soup to North America.

In Hungarian cuisine, sour cherry soup or meggyleves is a soup made from the fruits of the sour cherry tree (Prunus cerasus), and not from sweet cherries. The name is formed from meggy 'sour cherries,' and leves meaning 'soup.' It is traditionally served as a dinner course, usually as either the appetizer, soup or dessert, on warm summer nights or for hot summer luncheons. The soup is cooked with whole sour cherries, including the pits. Sour cherry trees are numerous in Hungary, and the soup is a good example of the quintessentially Hungarian fusion of Eastern/Asian influences and traditional Continental European cuisine. It is customary that the soup contains fresh sour cherries, fresh cream and sometimes cloves and cinnamon. Canned regular cherries are sometimes added and sour cream is often substituted for fresh cream. A small amount of sweet white or dry red wine is also sometimes added before serving. Packets of dried meggyleves powder are also sold in Hungary.

== See also ==
- List of cherry dishes
- List of soups
