= Breuches =

- Commune
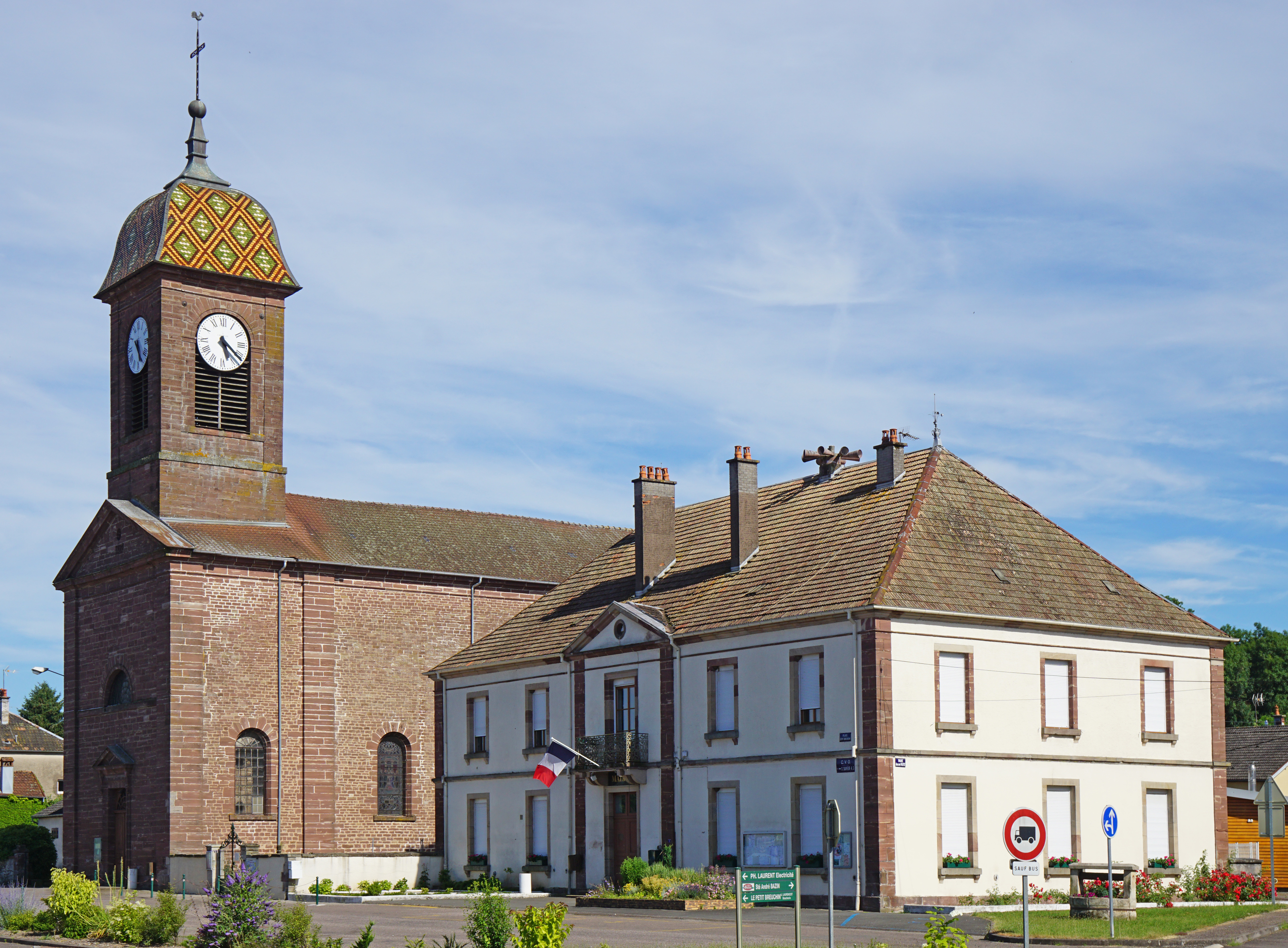
- The church and town hall in Breuches

- Coat of arms
- Location of Breuches
- Location within France Location within Bourgogne-Franche-Comté
- Coordinates: 47°47′54″N 6°19′52″E
- Country: France
- Region: Bourgogne-Franche-Comté
- Department: Haute-Saône
- Arrondissement: Lure
- Canton: Luxeuil-les-Bains

Government
  - Mayor (2020–2026): Roland Chamagne
- Area^{1}: 9.12 km^{2} (3.52 sq mi)
- Highest elevation: 312 m (1,024 ft)
- Lowest elevation: 246 m (807 ft)
- Population (2023): 657
  - Density: 72.0/km^{2} (187/sq mi)
- Time zone: UTC+01:00 (CET)
  - Summer (DST): UTC+02:00 (CEST)
- INSEE/Postal code: 70093 /70300
- ^{1} French Land Register data, which excludes lakes, ponds, glaciers > 1 km^{2} (0.386 sq mi or 247 acres) and river estuaries.

Breuches (French pronunciation: [bʁœʃ]) is a commune in the Haute-Saône department in the region of Bourgogne-Franche-Comté in eastern France.

Home to the sponsors of the UCI Pro cycle team Wagner Bazin.

== See also ==
- Communes of the Haute-Saône department
