= Froideconche =

- Commune
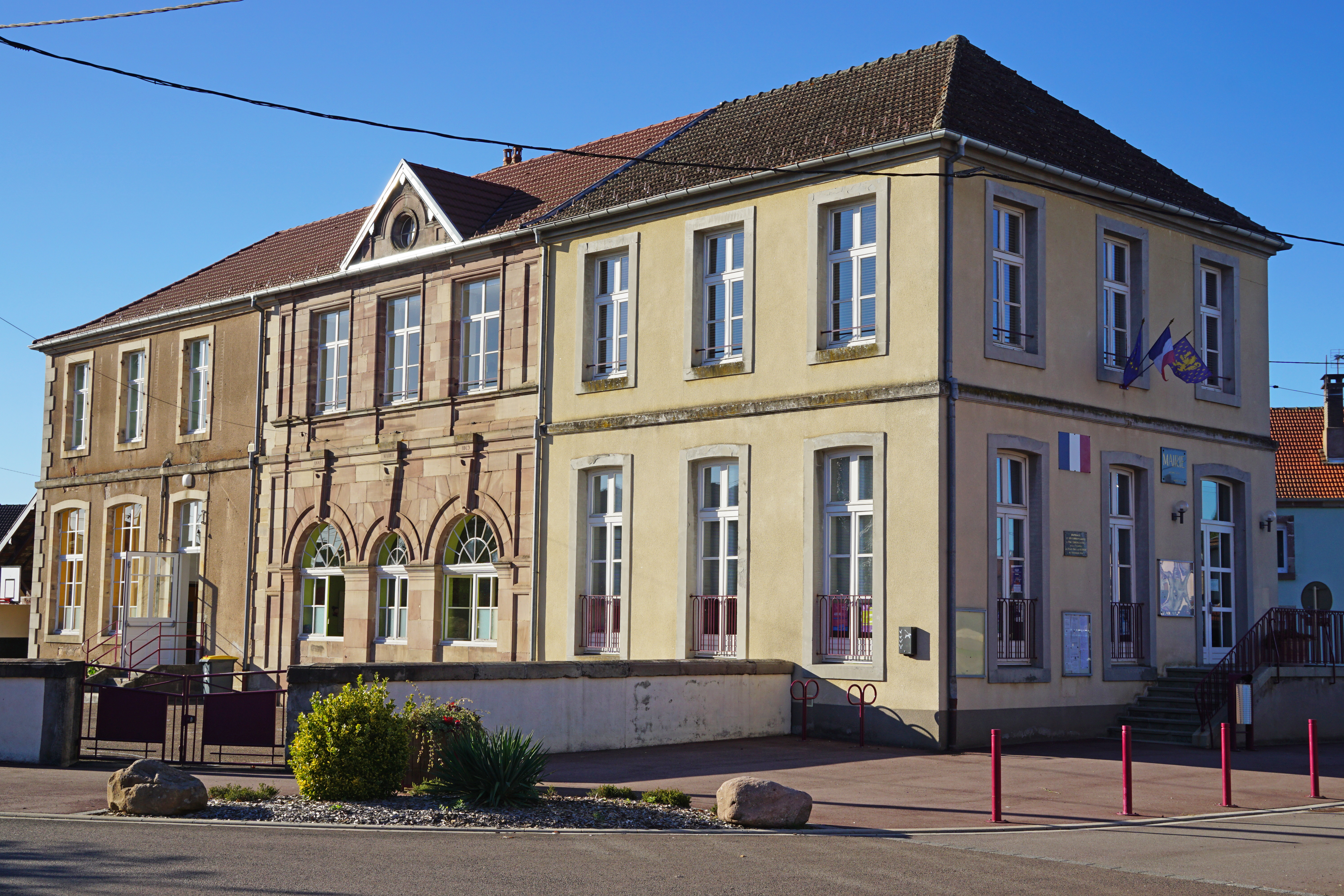
- The town hall in Froideconche

- Coat of arms
- Location of Froideconche
- Location within France Location within Bourgogne-Franche-Comté
- Coordinates: 47°49′18″N 6°25′01″E
- Country: France
- Region: Bourgogne-Franche-Comté
- Department: Haute-Saône
- Arrondissement: Lure
- Canton: Luxeuil-les-Bains

Government
  - Mayor (2020–2026): Éric Petitjean
- Area^{1}: 16.04 km^{2} (6.19 sq mi)
- Highest elevation: 436 m (1,430 ft)
- Lowest elevation: 288 m (945 ft)
- Population (2023): 1,960
  - Density: 122/km^{2} (316/sq mi)
- Time zone: UTC+01:00 (CET)
  - Summer (DST): UTC+02:00 (CEST)
- INSEE/Postal code: 70258 /70300
- ^{1} French Land Register data, which excludes lakes, ponds, glaciers > 1 km^{2} (0.386 sq mi or 247 acres) and river estuaries.

Froideconche (French pronunciation: [fʁwadkɔ̃ʃ]) is a commune in the Haute-Saône department in the region of Bourgogne-Franche-Comté in eastern France.

== See also ==
- Communes of the Haute-Saône department
