= Griottines =

Cherries prepared in alcohol

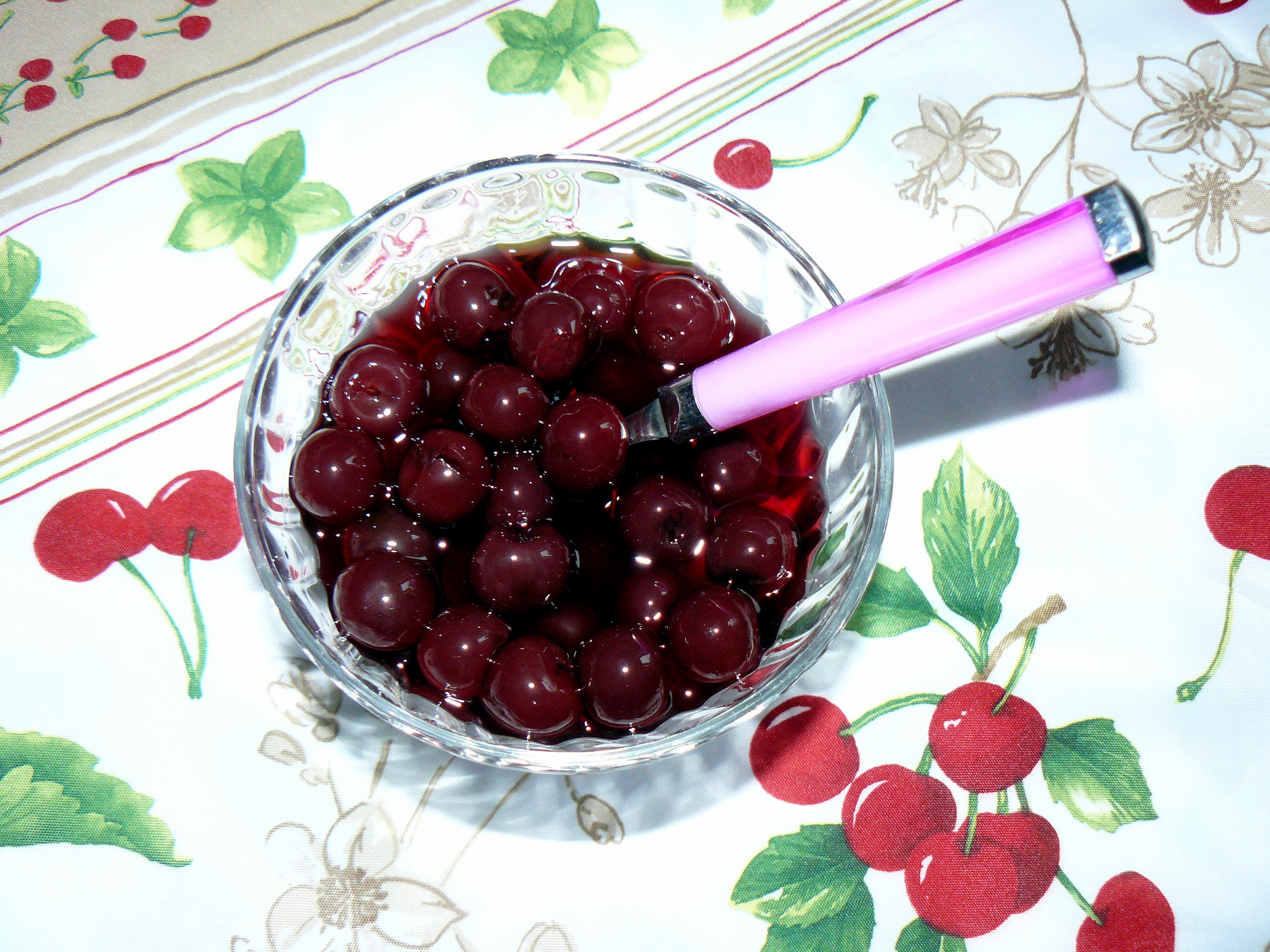
Griottines de Fougerolles

Griottines are cherries macerated in eau de vie or kirsch, common to Fougerolles (Haute-Saône) in Franche-Comté, eastern France. They can be eaten alone, or used in a number of local dishes both savoury and sweet.

== See also ==
- List of cherry dishes
