= Fougerolles-Saint-Valbert =

- Commune
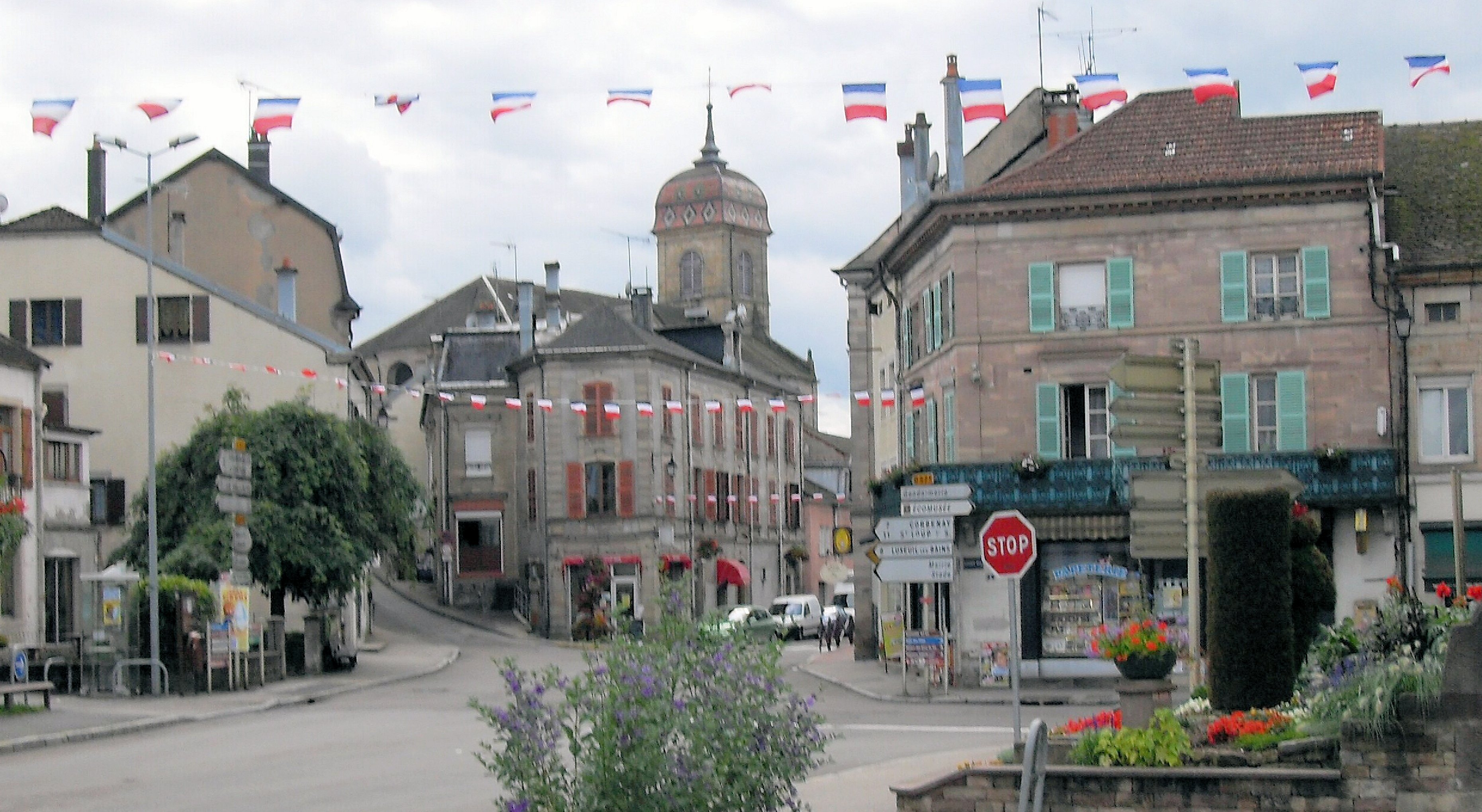
- Fougerolles
- Location of Fougerolles-Saint-Valbert
- Location within France Location within Bourgogne-Franche-Comté
- Coordinates: 47°53′10″N 6°24′12″E
- Country: France
- Region: Bourgogne-Franche-Comté
- Department: Haute-Saône
- Arrondissement: Lure
- Canton: Saint-Loup-sur-Semouse and Luxeuil-les-Bains
- Intercommunality: Haute Comté

Government
  - Mayor (2024–2026): Christiane Oudot
- Area^{1}: 55.02 km^{2} (21.24 sq mi)
- Highest elevation: 569 m (1,867 ft)
- Lowest elevation: 276 m (906 ft)
- Population (2023): 3,764
  - Density: 68.41/km^{2} (177.2/sq mi)
- Time zone: UTC+01:00 (CET)
  - Summer (DST): UTC+02:00 (CEST)
- INSEE/Postal code: 70245 /70220
- ^{1} French Land Register data, which excludes lakes, ponds, glaciers > 1 km^{2} (0.386 sq mi or 247 acres) and river estuaries.

Fougerolles-Saint-Valbert (French pronunciation: [fuʒʁɔl sɛ̃ valbɛʁ]) is a commune in the Haute-Saône department in the region of Bourgogne-Franche-Comté in eastern France. It was established on 1 January 2019 by merger of the former communes of Fougerolles (the seat) and Saint-Valbert.

== Population ==
Population data refer to the commune in its geography as of January 2025.

Historical population
Year	Pop.	±% p.a.
1968	4,435	—
1975	4,218	−0.71%
1982	4,341	+0.41%
1990	4,377	+0.10%
1999	4,162	−0.56%
2007	4,068	−0.29%
2012	3,963	−0.52%
2017	3,803	−0.82%
2023	3,764	−0.17%
Source: INSEE

== See also ==
- Communes of the Haute-Saône department
