= Gâteau Basque =

French pastry

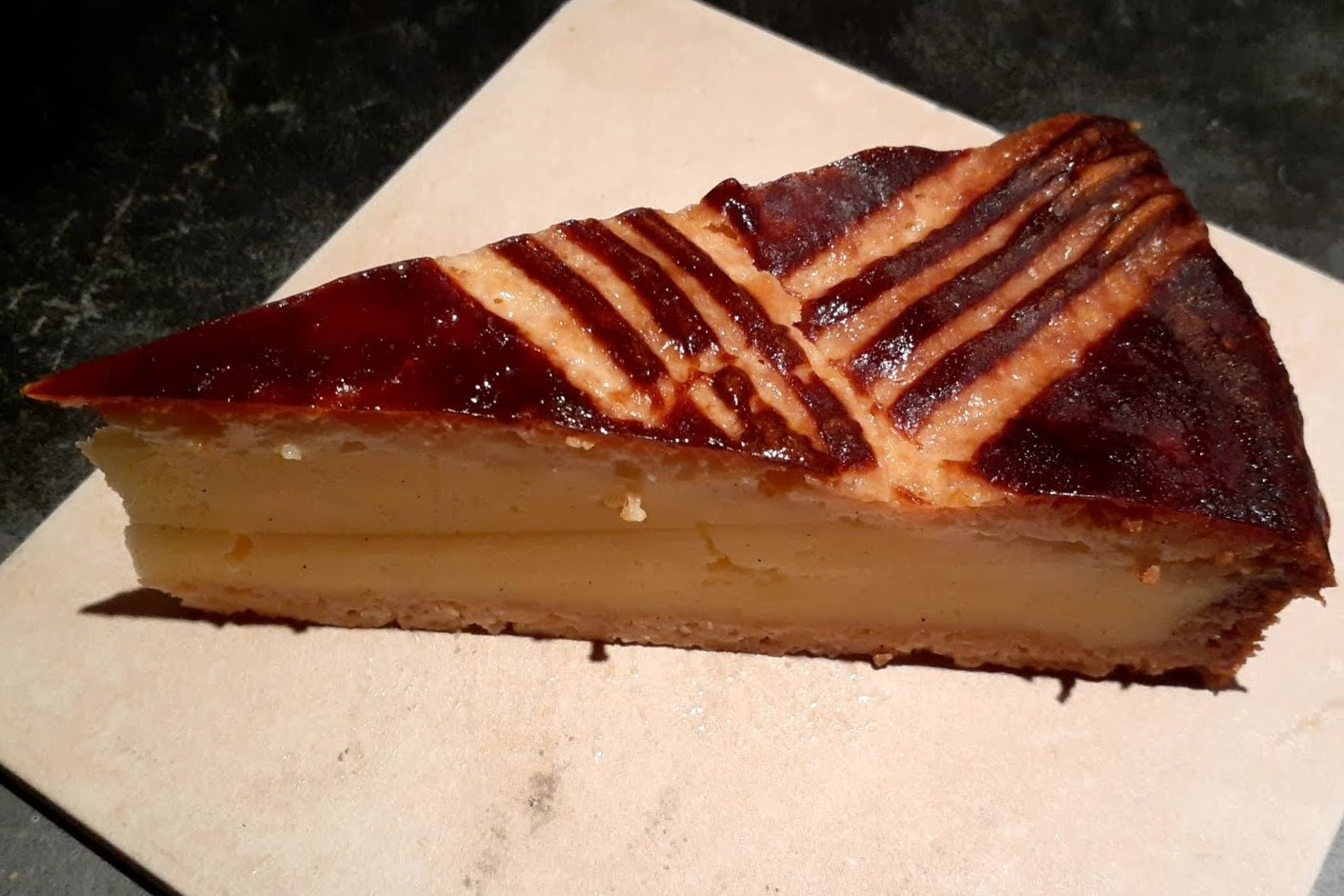
- Type: Pastry
- Course: Dessert
- Place of origin: Northern Basque Country
- Main ingredients: Almond flour, pastry cream or preserved cherries

Gâteau Basque (Basque: etxeko bixkotxa; "cake of the house") is a traditional dessert from the Northern Basque Country, typically filled with black cherry jam or pastry cream. Gâteau Basque with cream is more typical in the Southern Basque Country.

== Description ==
Typically Gâteau Basque is constructed from layers of a butter-sugar wheat flour pastry dough (in this case pâte sablée, not brisée) with a filling of either black cherry jam or almond or vanilla pastry cream. It has been argued that only black Xapata cherries native to the Basque Country should be used.

The dough is rolled out like a double crust pie and filled with jam or pastry cream. Similar to the Boston cream pie, which is a cake and not a pie, the Gâteau Basque dough produces a crumb-textured pastry that is chewy and tender.

It is traditional to mark a Basque cross on the top if the cake is filled with black cherry jam, or to use a crosshatch pattern on top if filled with pastry cream.

== History ==
The origins of Gâteau Basque are tied strongly with the town of Cambo-les-Bains, Labourd. It may have originally been made with bread and called bistochak in the 18th century. The fishermen took it out to sea. The first known commercialisation of the cake was by Marianne Hirigoyen in Cambo in the first half of the 19th century. Later editions were flavoured with rum, brought back to France by Basques from the West Indies.

The Gâteau Basque Festival (Fête du Gâteau Basque) is organized each year in Cambo-les-Bains. Eguzkia ("sun" in Basque), an association to promote quality Basque cake, was founded in France in 1994. There is a museum dedicated to the cake, Le musée du Gâteau Basque, in Sare, Labourd.

== See also ==
- List of almond dishes
- List of cherry dishes
