= Cherry Mash =

Cherry, peanut, and chocolate candy

Cherry Mash

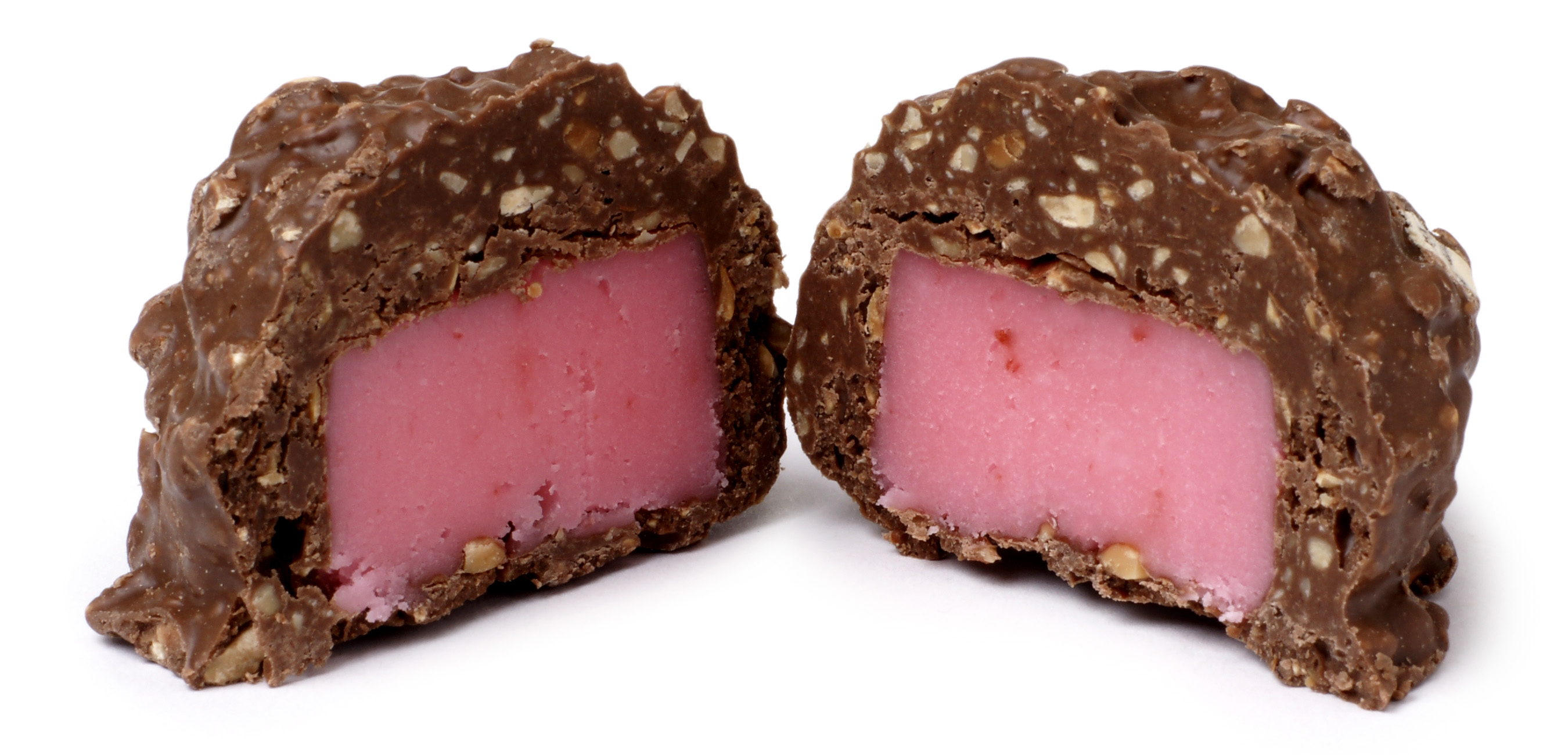
A Cherry Mash split in half

Cherry Mash is an American candy bar consisting of a soft, cherry-flavored center containing maraschino cherries, covered in a mixture of chopped roasted peanuts and chocolate.

The Cherry Mash was formulated in 1918 by Ernest Chase, son of Dr. George Washington Chase, who went into the candy business in St. Joseph, Missouri, in 1876.

The original candy consisted of a quarter-pound mound of chopped roasted peanuts, blended with a chocolate coating over a smooth cherry fondant center. It was originally called Cherry Chase, and then Cherry Chaser before becoming known as Cherry Mash.

In 1944, the Chicago-based F.S. Yantis and Company purchased Chase Candy for more than $1 million. In 1954, Chase Candy acquired the Bunte Brothers Candy Company, makers of the fruit-filled hard candy known as Diana Stuft Confections. Bunte is also credited with making the first chocolate-covered candy bar, the Tangos, around 1914.

Today, Cherry Mash remains the Chase Candy Company's best-selling product. It is still produced in a factory in Saint Joseph, Missouri, and can be found throughout the Midwest in most grocery and convenience stores and mass-merchandise outlets. To this day, Cherry Mash continues to be the best-selling cherry candy bar in the United States according to the Chase Candy website.

== See also ==
- Twin Bing
- List of chocolate bar brands
