= Lowney Chocolate Factory =

- U.S. National Register of Historic Places
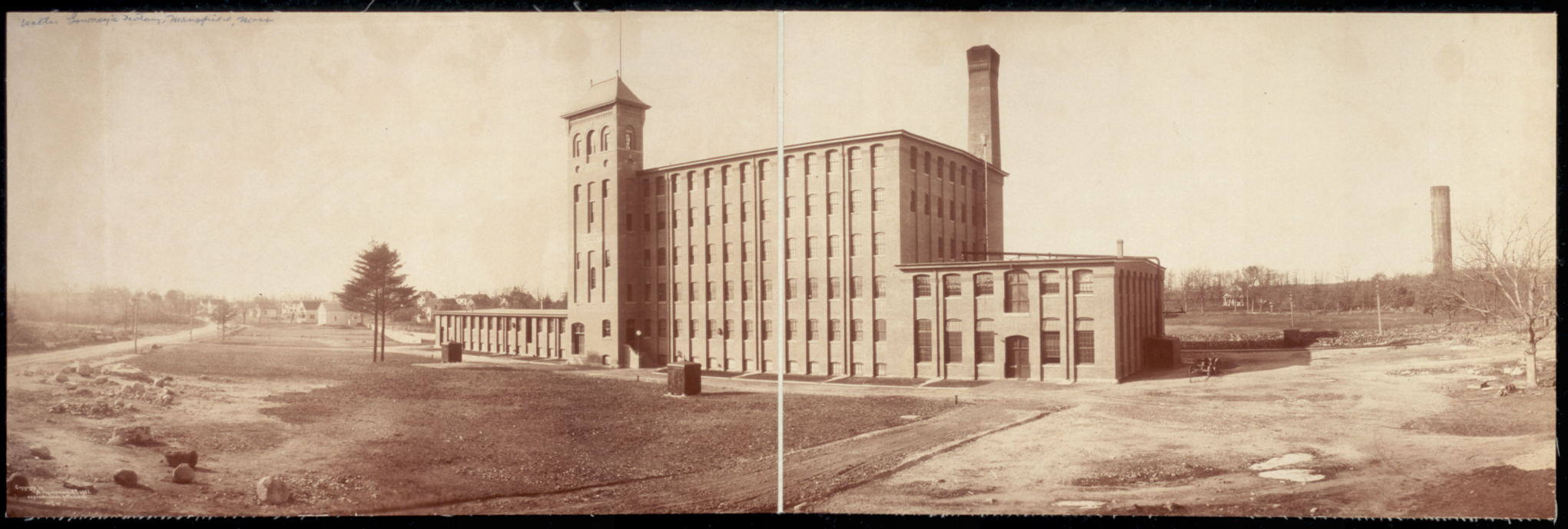

- Location within Massachusetts Location within the United States
- Location: 150 Oakland St., Mansfield, Massachusetts
- Coordinates: 42°2′22″N 71°12′52″W
- Area: 14 acres (5.7 ha)
- Built: 1903
- Architect: Dean & Main
- Architectural style: Late Victorian
- NRHP reference No.: 16000156
- Added to NRHP: April 12, 2016

The Lowney Chocolate Factory is a historic industrial complex at 150 Oakland Street in Mansfield, Massachusetts. Developed beginning in 1903, the complex was used until 2010 by a variety of primarily corporate owners for the manufacture and processing of chocolate products, most recently Archer Daniels Midland. The complex, vacant in 2016, was listed on the National Register of Historic Places in 2016 as an important local employer, and a good local example of Late Victorian industrial architecture.

== Description and history ==
The former Lowney Chocolate Company plant stands on the north side of Mansfield Center, between Oakland Street and the Providence/Stoughton Line railroad tracks. The complex contains seven buildings on 14 acres (5.7 ha), ranging in construction date from 1903 to 1995. The centerpiece of the complex is Building 1, a five-story brick building with centrally placed seven-story tower. Windows are set in segmented-arch openings separated by brick piers, with granite sills, and some openings now filled in with panels. The tower, three bays wide and one deep, has round-arch windows at the top level, and elaborate brick corbelling below the eave of the flared hip roof.

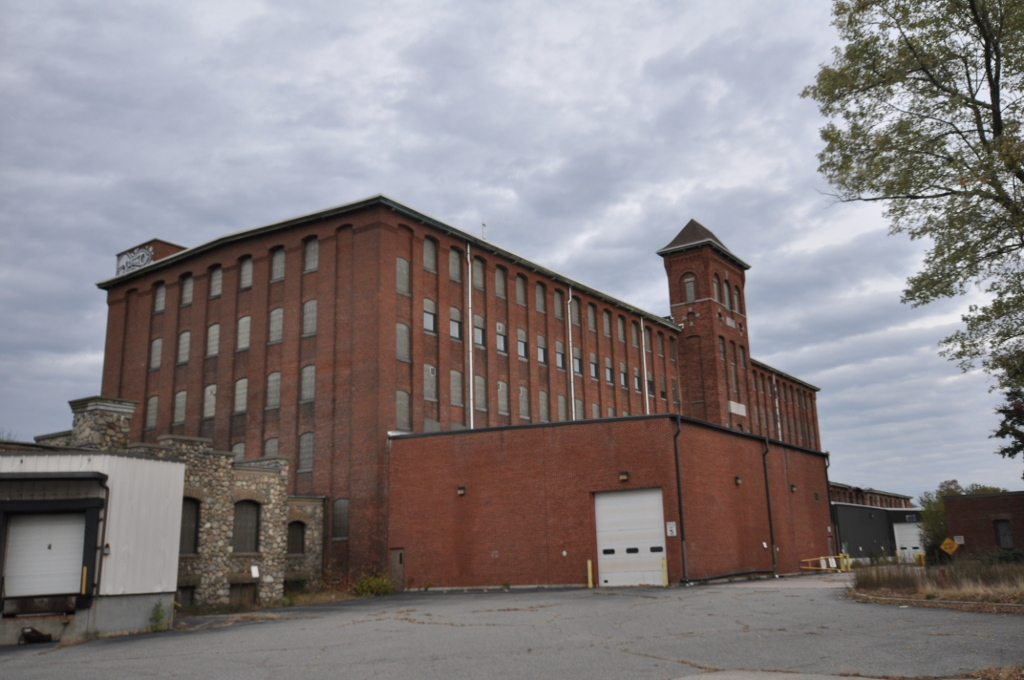
2017 photo

The Walter M. Lowney Company was a chocolate and candy business founded in Boston in the early 1880s by Walter M. Lowney, a native of Bangor, Maine. Lowney's business was a great success, and experienced rapid growth over the next fifteen years, repeatedly expanding its presence in Boston's Commercial Street area. The availability of ready railroad access to this property in Mansfield prompted its selection for a major expansion, and the Lowney Chocolate Company was formed as a subsidiary to manage all of the chocolate production for both the Walter M. Lowney Company and wholesale customers. Lowney himself moved to Mansfield, where he was a prominent citizen until his death 1921. The company went through a series of corporate owners, who continued to use and develop the facility. It was closed in 2010 by Archer Daniels Midland.

== See also ==
- National Register of Historic Places listings in Bristol County, Massachusetts
