= Fougerolles, Haute-Saône =

Fougerolles
- Part of Fougerolles-Saint-Valbert
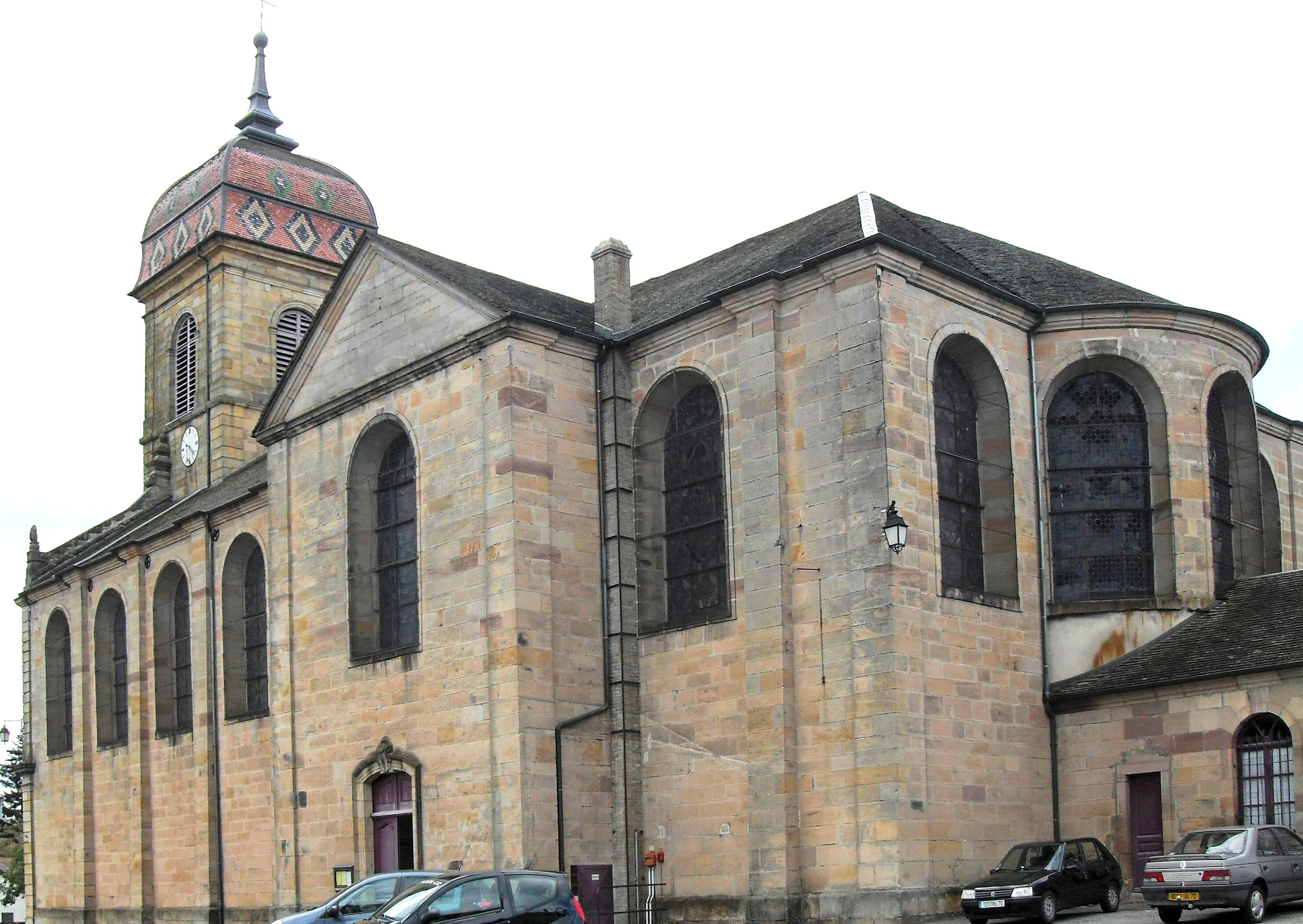
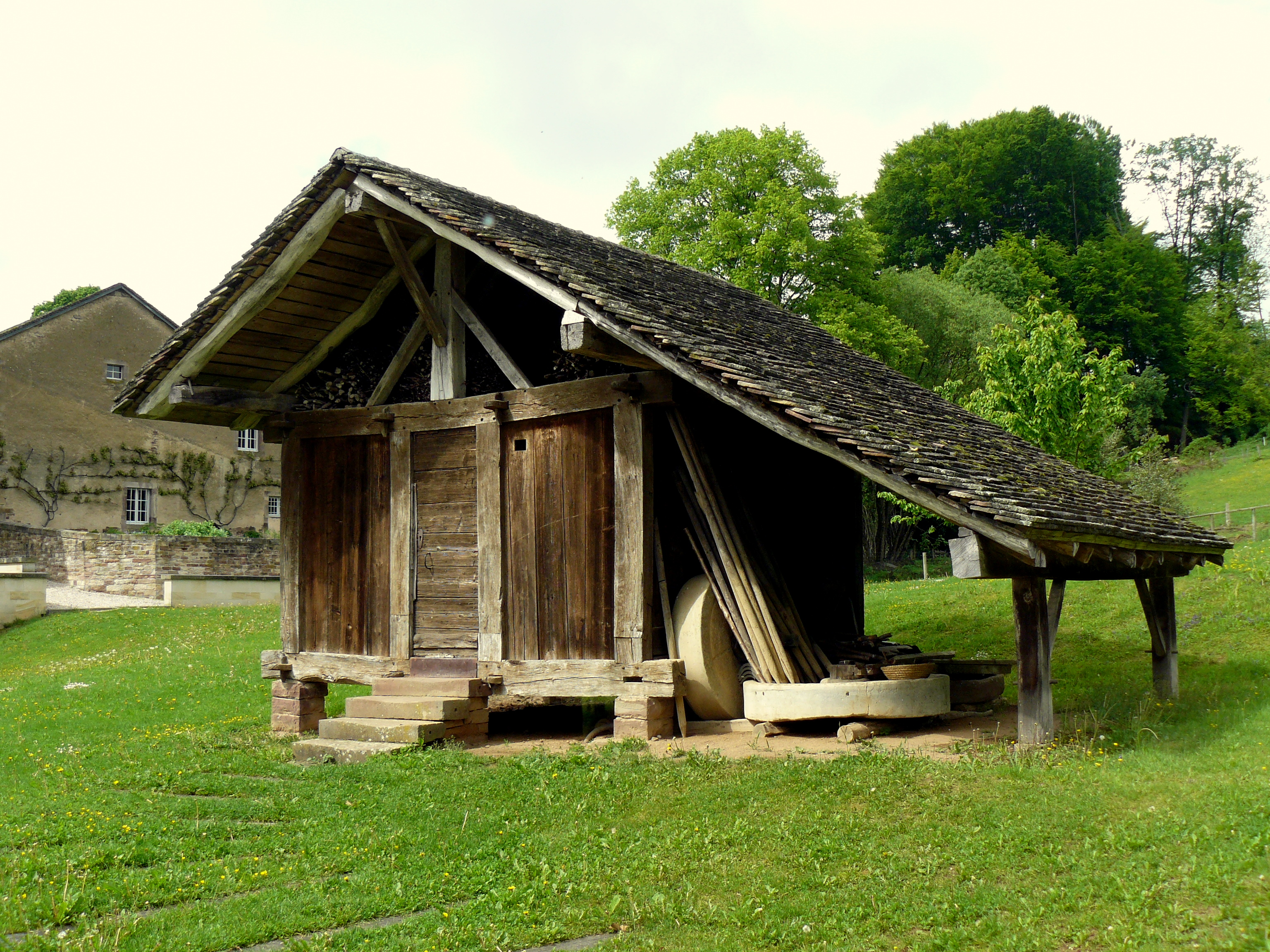
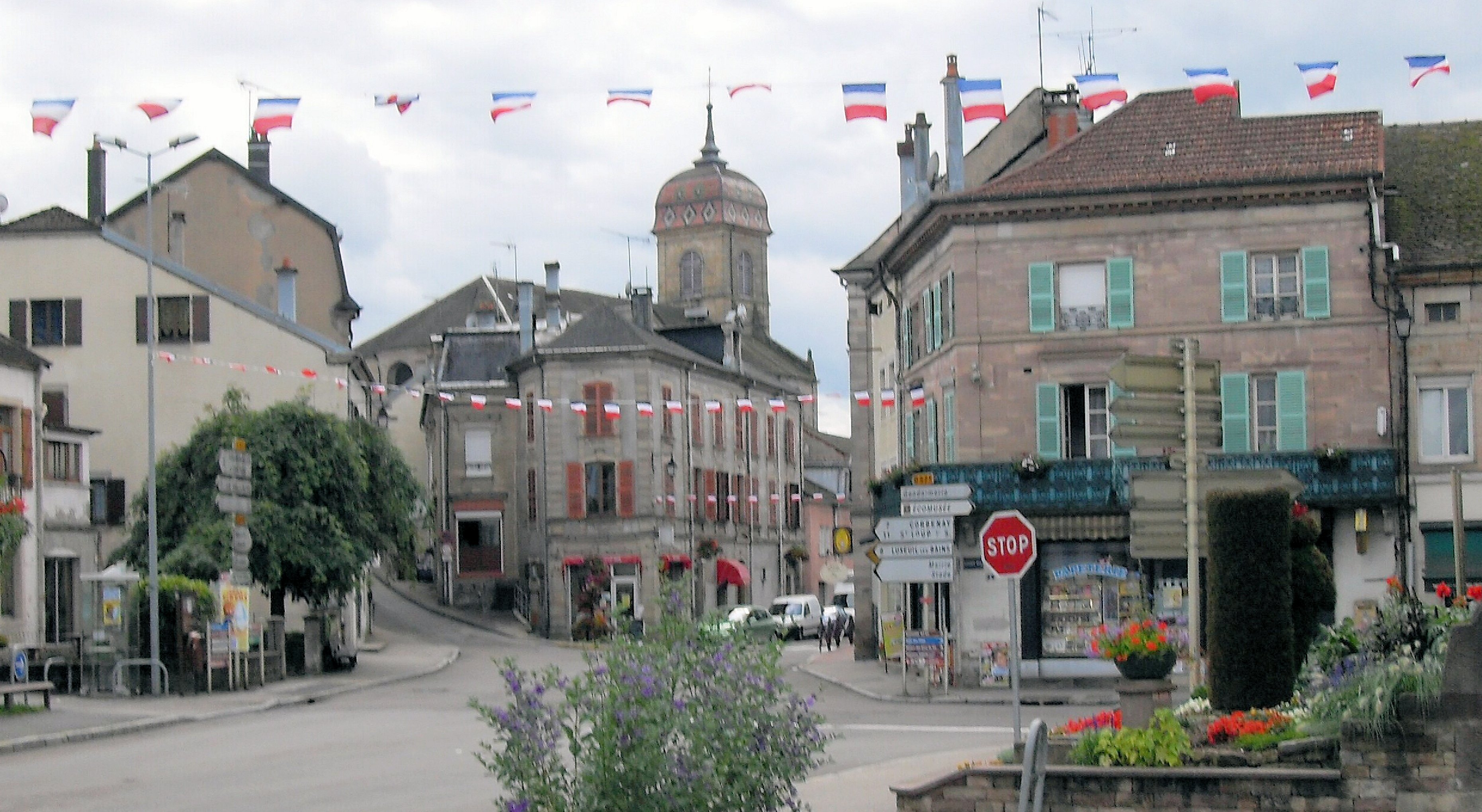
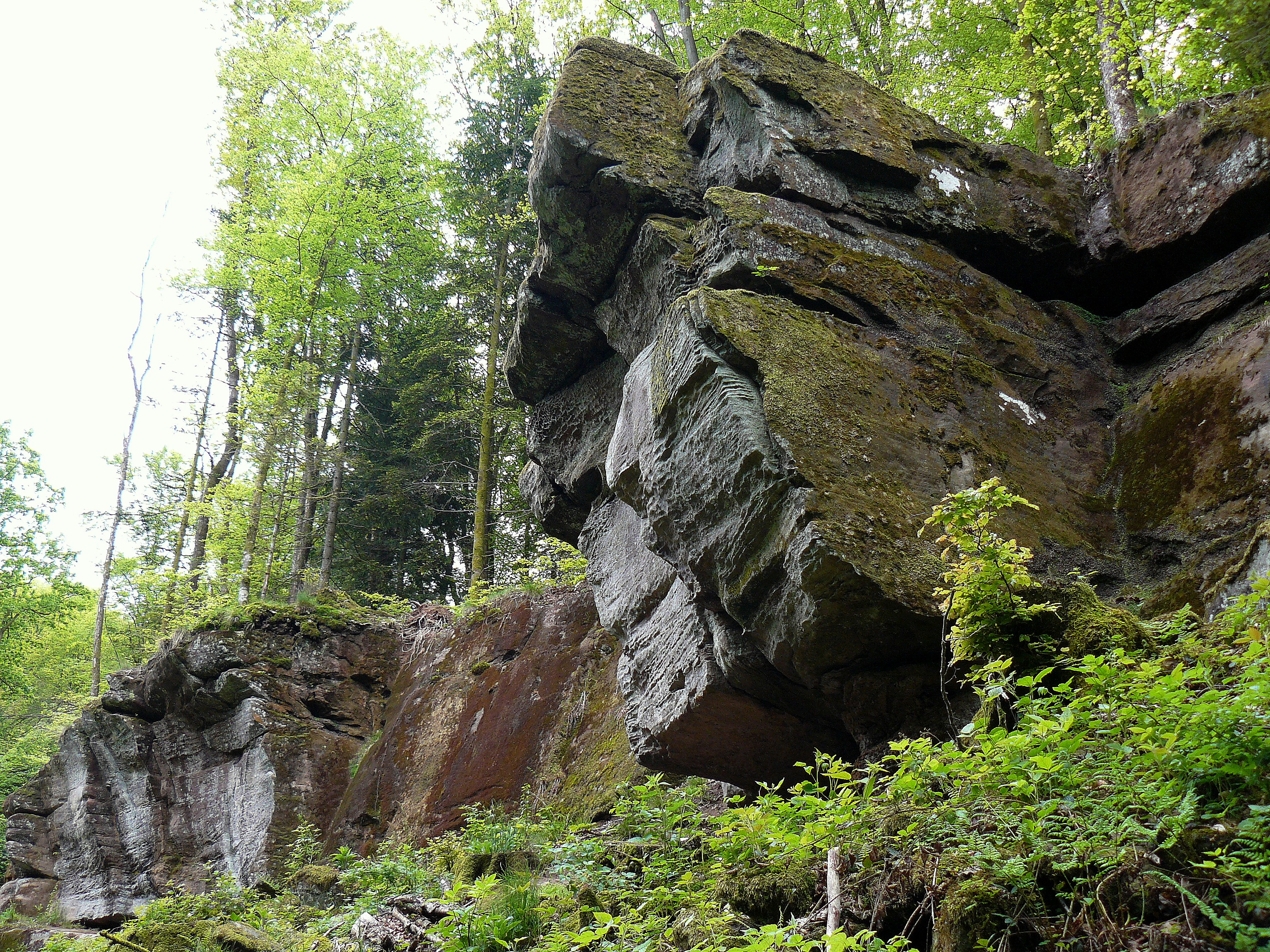
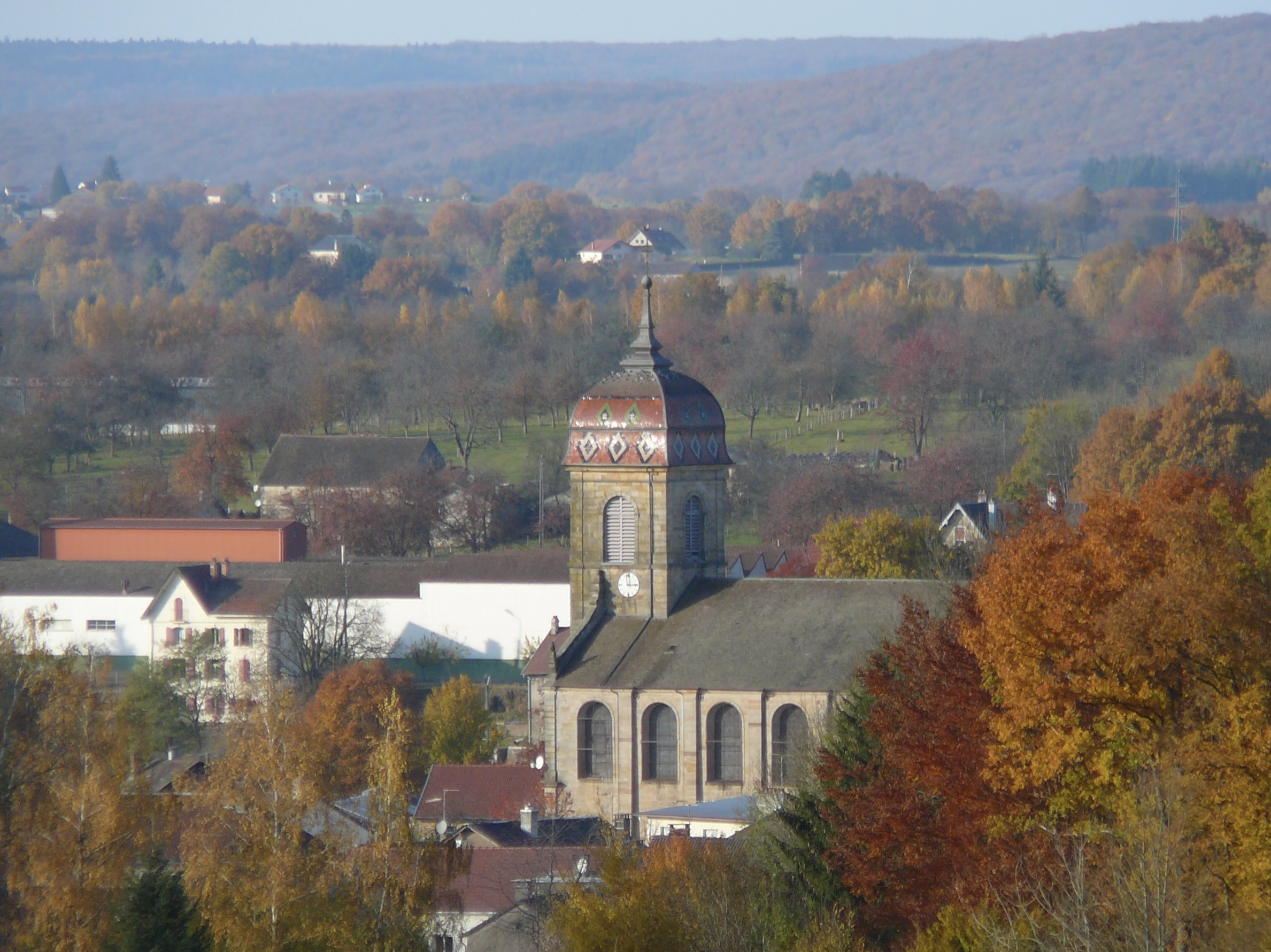

- Coat of arms
- Location of Fougerolles
- Location within France Location within Bourgogne-Franche-Comté
- Coordinates: 47°53′10″N 6°24′12″E
- Country: France
- Region: Bourgogne-Franche-Comté
- Department: Haute-Saône
- Arrondissement: Lure
- Canton: Saint-Loup-sur-Semouse
- Commune: Fougerolles-Saint-Valbert
- Area^{1}: 51.12 km^{2} (19.74 sq mi)
- Highest elevation: 569 m (1,867 ft)
- Lowest elevation: 276 m (906 ft)
- Population (2022): 3,529
  - Density: 69.03/km^{2} (178.8/sq mi)
- Time zone: UTC+01:00 (CET)
  - Summer (DST): UTC+02:00 (CEST)
- Postal code: 70220
- ^{1} French Land Register data, which excludes lakes, ponds, glaciers > 1 km^{2} (0.386 sq mi or 247 acres) and river estuaries.

Fougerolles (French pronunciation: [fuʒʁɔl]) is a former commune in the Haute-Saône department in the region of Bourgogne-Franche-Comté in eastern France. On 1 January 2019, it was merged into the new commune Fougerolles-Saint-Valbert. It is known for its kirsch and griottines.

== Geography ==
Fougerolles is a fairly large town of 5112 hectares, making it the largest municipality of Haute-Saône after Champlitte. It borders the Lorraine region.

The city is bisected by the river Combeauté, which descends from the neighbouring commune of Le Val-d'Ajol.

== See also ==
- Communes of the Haute-Saône department
