= Canton of Luxeuil-les-Bains =

Coordinates: 47.82°N 6.38°E

The canton of Luxeuil-les-Bains is an administrative division of the Haute-Saône department, northeastern France. Its borders were modified at the French canton reorganisation which came into effect in March 2015. Its seat is in Luxeuil-les-Bains.

It consists of the following communes:

1. Ailloncourt
2. Baudoncourt
3. Breuches
4. Brotte-lès-Luxeuil
5. La Chapelle-lès-Luxeuil
6. Citers
7. Esboz-Brest
8. Fougerolles-Saint-Valbert (partly)
9. Froideconche
10. Luxeuil-les-Bains
11. Ormoiche
12. Saint-Sauveur
