= Île de Versailles Japanese Garden =

Japanese styled garden in Nantes

The Île de Versailles Japanese Garden
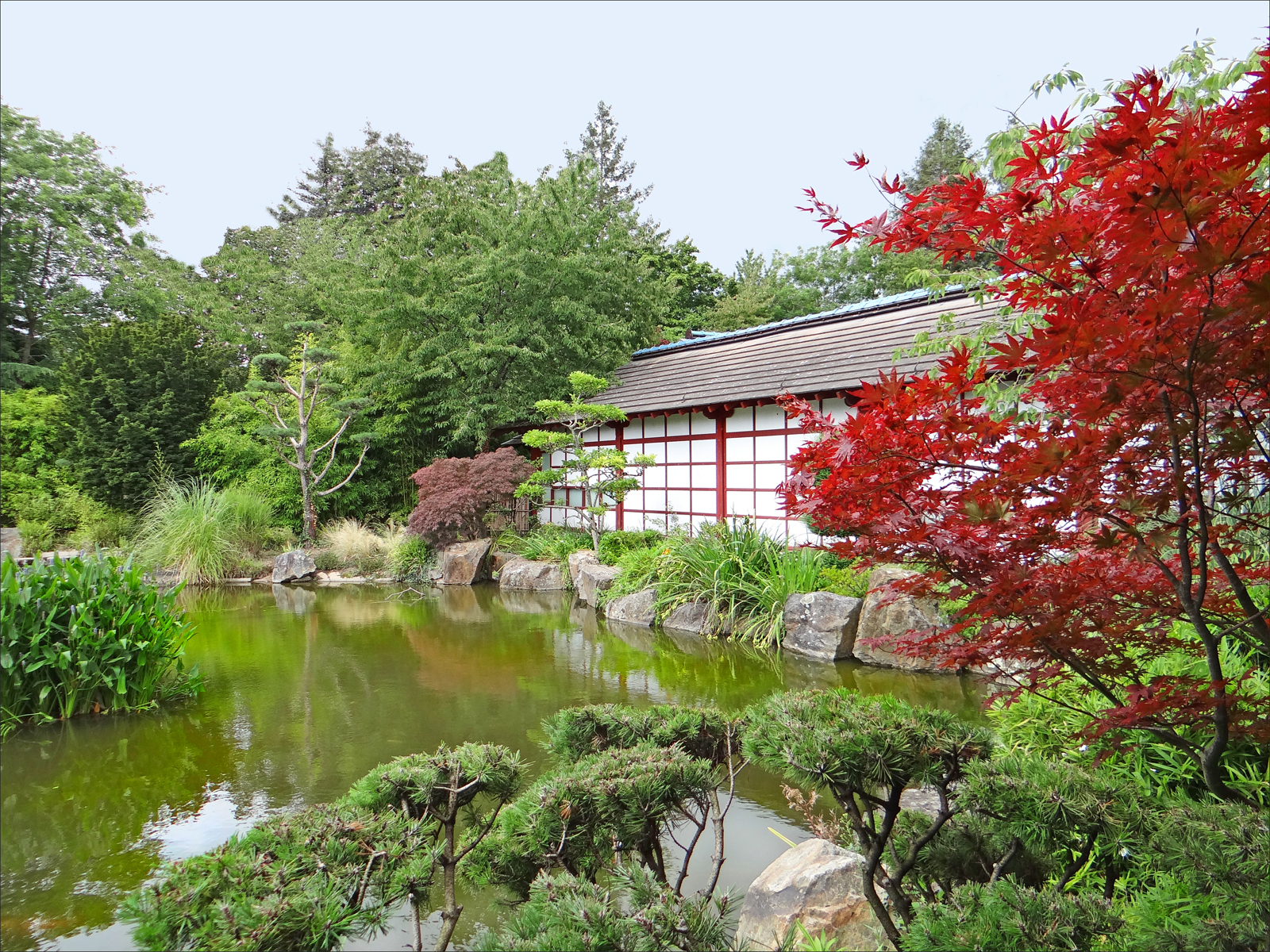
- Japanese garden on Île de Versailles
- Interactive map of The Île de Versailles Japanese Garden
- Type: japanese garden
- Location: France, Brittany
- Nearest city: Nantes
- Coordinates: 47°13′33″N 1°33′16″W
- Area: 1.7 hectares (4.2 acres)

The Île de Versailles Japanese Garden is a Japanese garden located on the artificial island of Île de Versailles, which was built from soil excavated during the construction of the Nantes–Brest canal. It is situated in Nantes, France.

== History ==
In 1986, the island, which had previously been privately owned, was bought by the city, after which landscaping work began under the leadership of Michel Chauty, the Mayor of Nantes from 1983 to 1989. Following an architectural competition, the project by a team consisting of Jacques Dulieu, Claudine Breton, Michel Cormier, and Michel Dudon, supplemented by landscape designer Louis Soulard, was commissioned to implement a project on a Japanese theme.

The garden opened on 11 September 1987. The garden was completely renovated in 2019.

== Types of garden ==
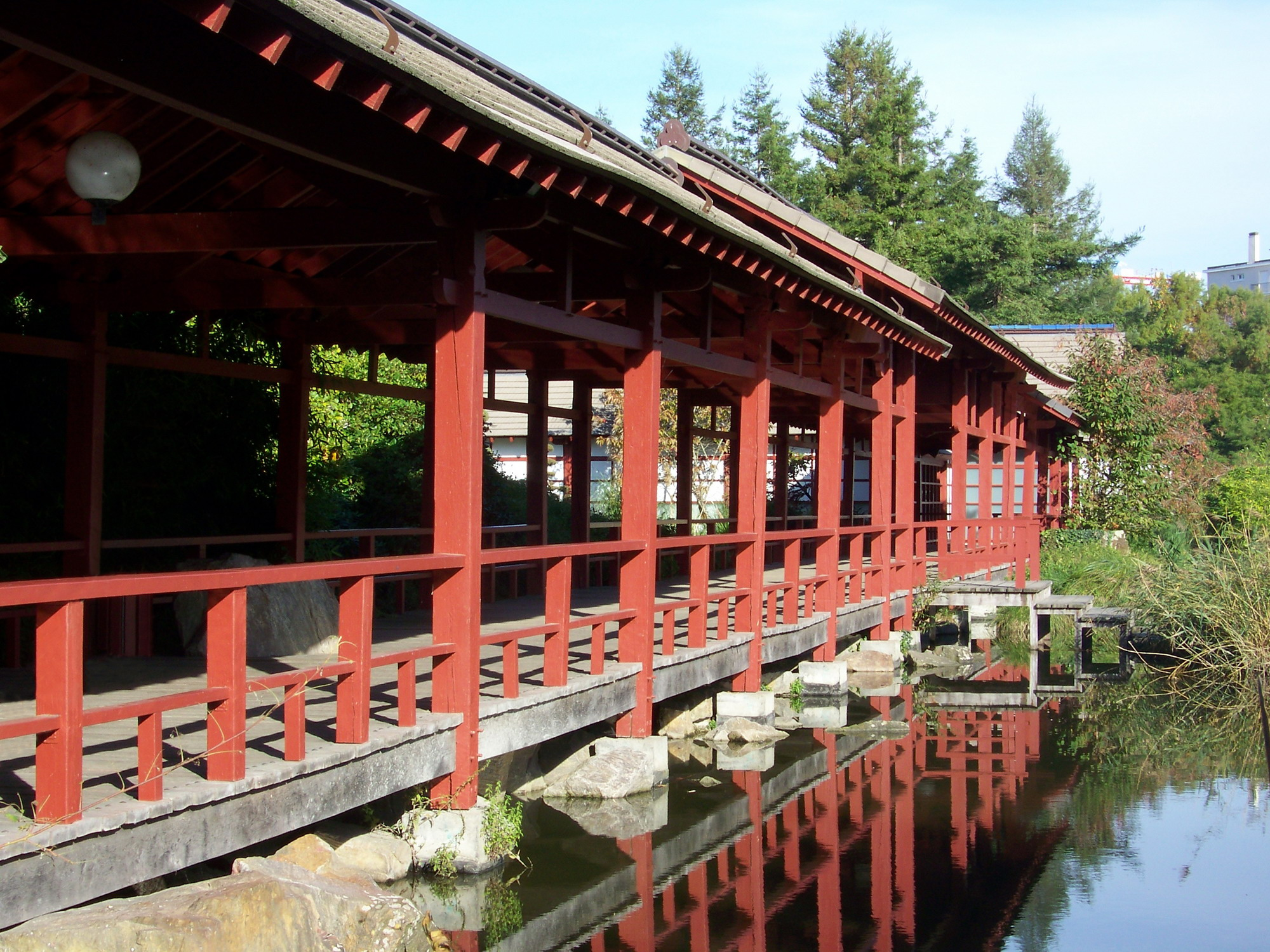

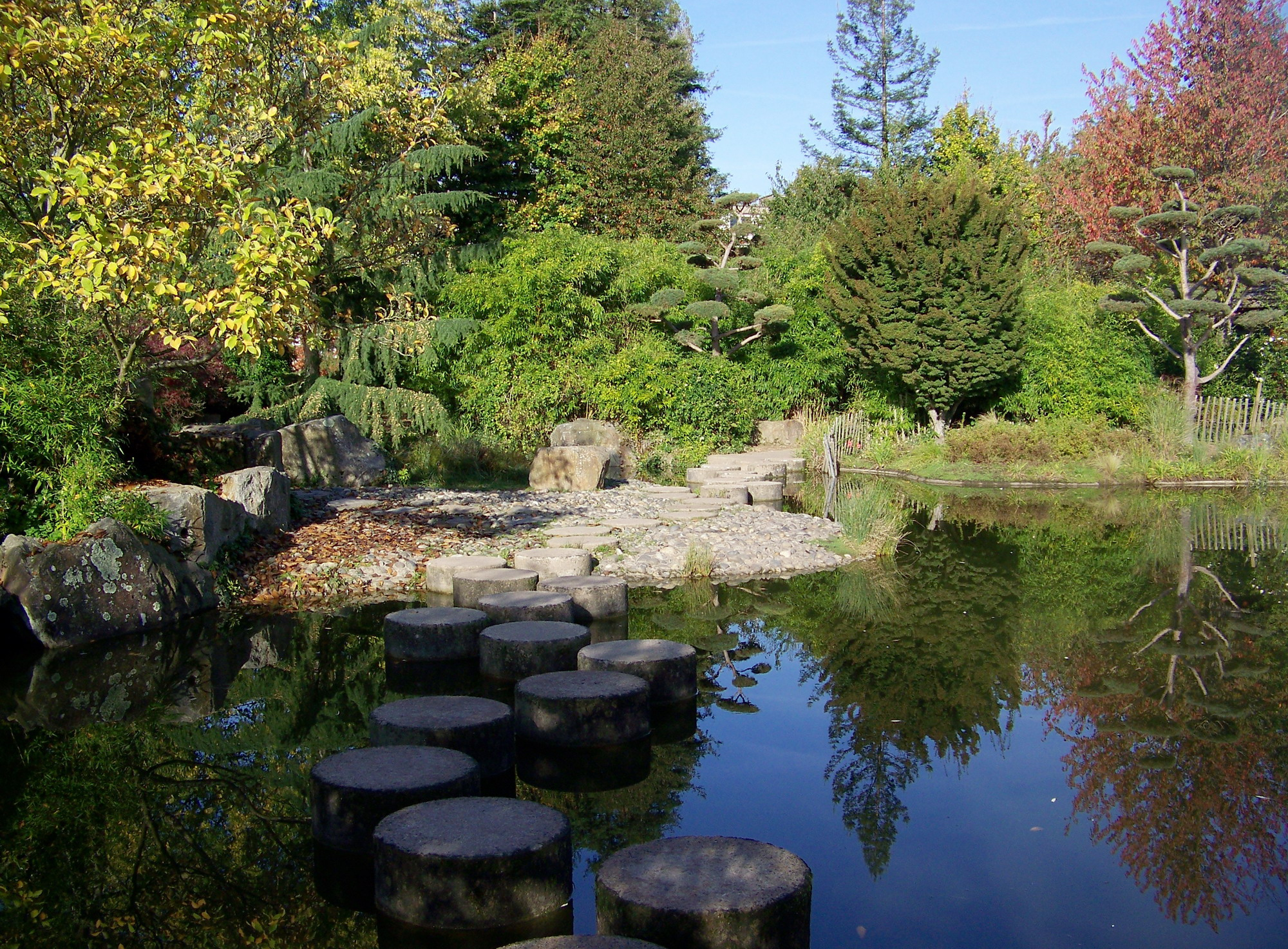

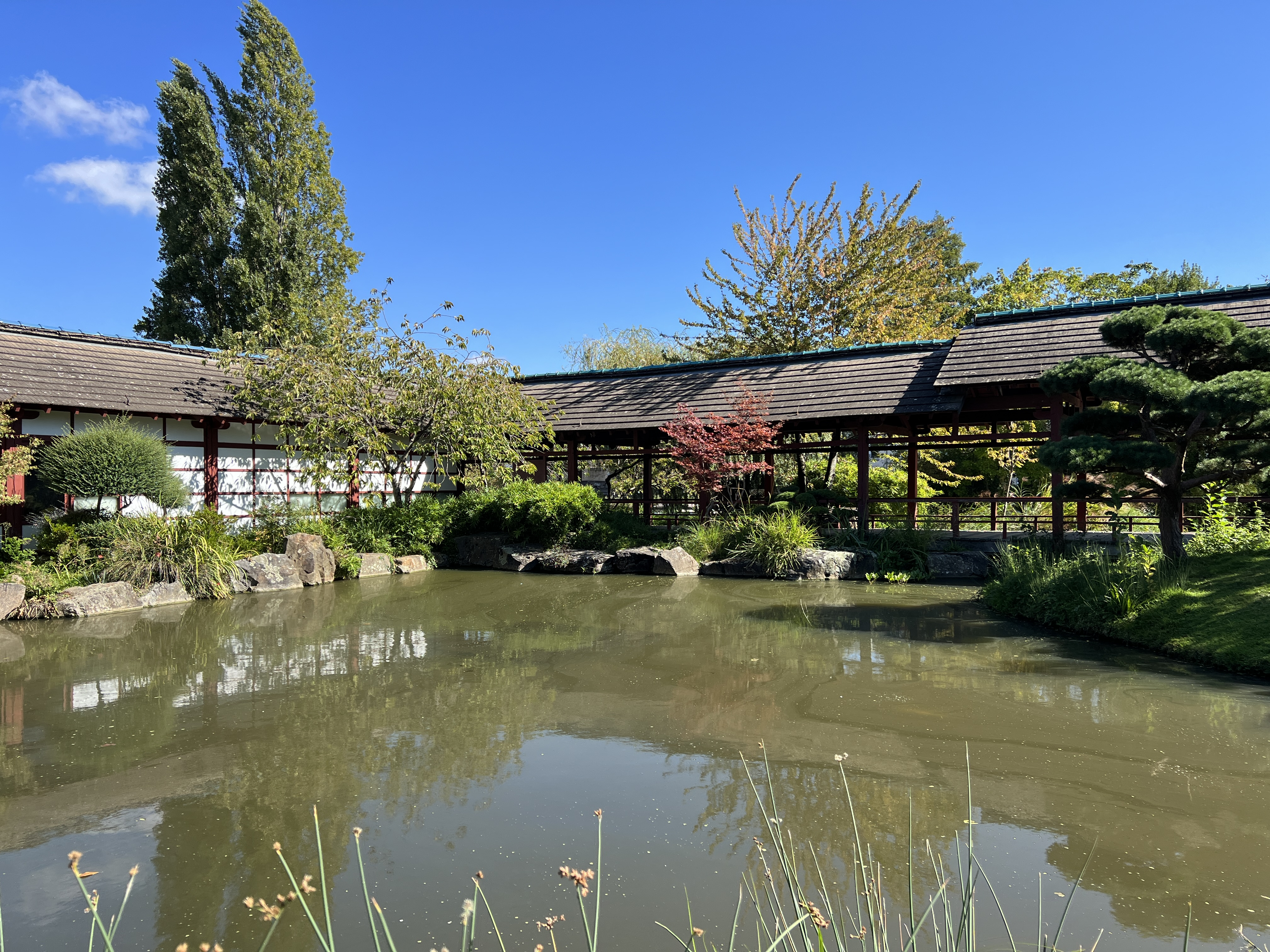

== Description ==
The park is built around three structures inspired by traditional Japanese housing:

- The Captaincy, intended for managing activities on the Erdre quays;
- The "House of the Erdre", whose rectangular structure surrounds a zen garden; it is used for hosting numerous exhibitions dedicated to the river itself and its aquatic environment;
- The restaurant "La Cocotte en verre", now closed, located on the northern edge of the island.

The landscape, created and structured by rock formations consisting of waterfalls and ponds, is richly planted with exotic plants such as bamboo, bald cypresses, rhododendrons, camellias and Japanese cherries.
