= Prunus 'Kanzan' =

Japanese flowering cherry cultivar

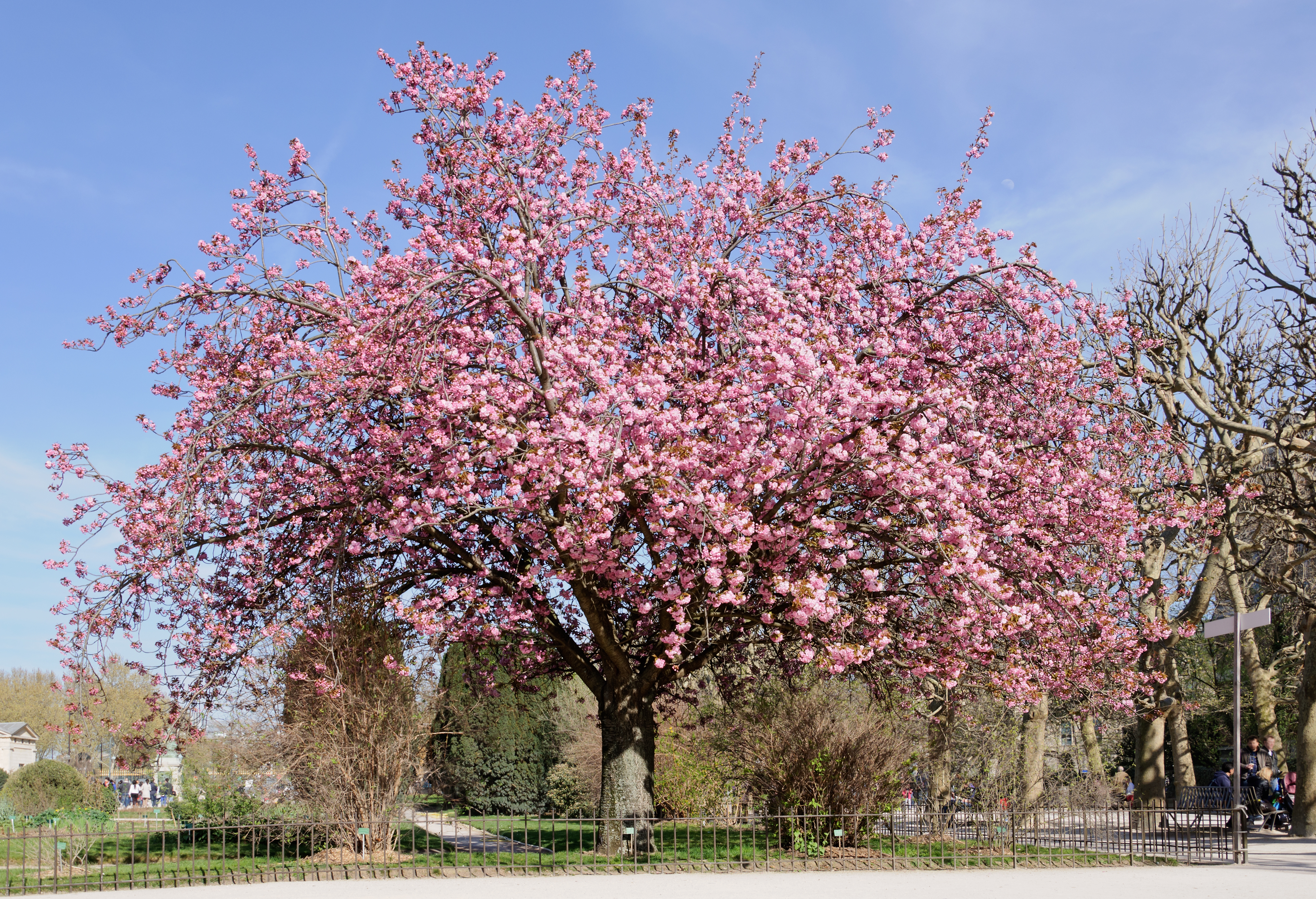
- Flowering tree at Jardin des Plantes, Paris
- Genus: Prunus
- Species: Prunus serrulata
- Cultivar: 'Kanzan'
- Origin: Edo Japan

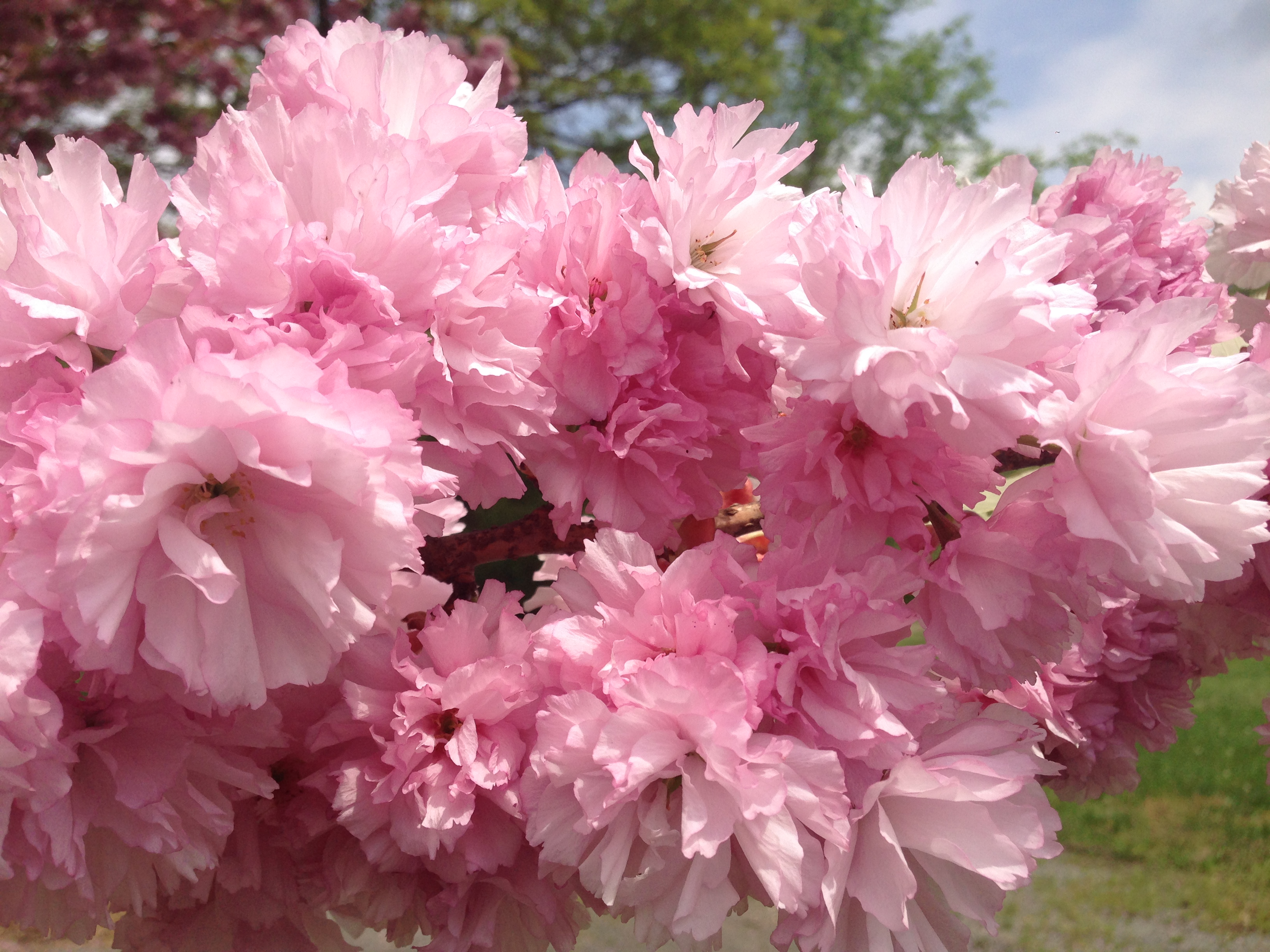
Kanzan is a double flower with 20 to 50 petals.

Prunus 'Kanzan' (Prunus serrulata 'Kanzan'. syn. Prunus lannesiana 'Kanzan', Cerasus Sato-zakura Group 'Sekiyama' Koidz, Kwanzan or Sekiyama, Japanese 関山) is a flowering cherry cultivar. It was developed in the Edo period in Japan as a result of multiple interspecific hybrids based on the Oshima cherry.

It is a deciduous tree that grows to between 1 and 9 metres (3 ft 3 in and 29 ft 6 in) high with an 8-metre (25 ft) spread. Young trees have a vase-shaped habit that becomes more spreading into maturity. In winter they produce red buds, opening to 5-centimetre (2 in) diameter deep-pink double flowers. The trees, which are usually propagated by chip budding or grafting, prefer a well-drained location in full sun.

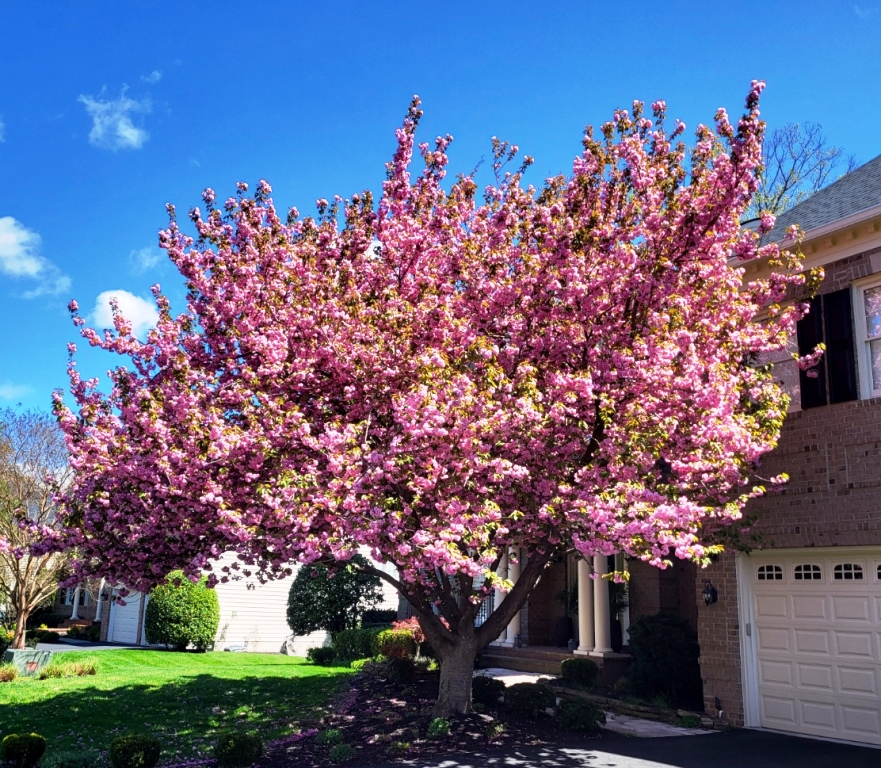
Kanzan Cherry tree in full bloom in April in Virginia, USA.

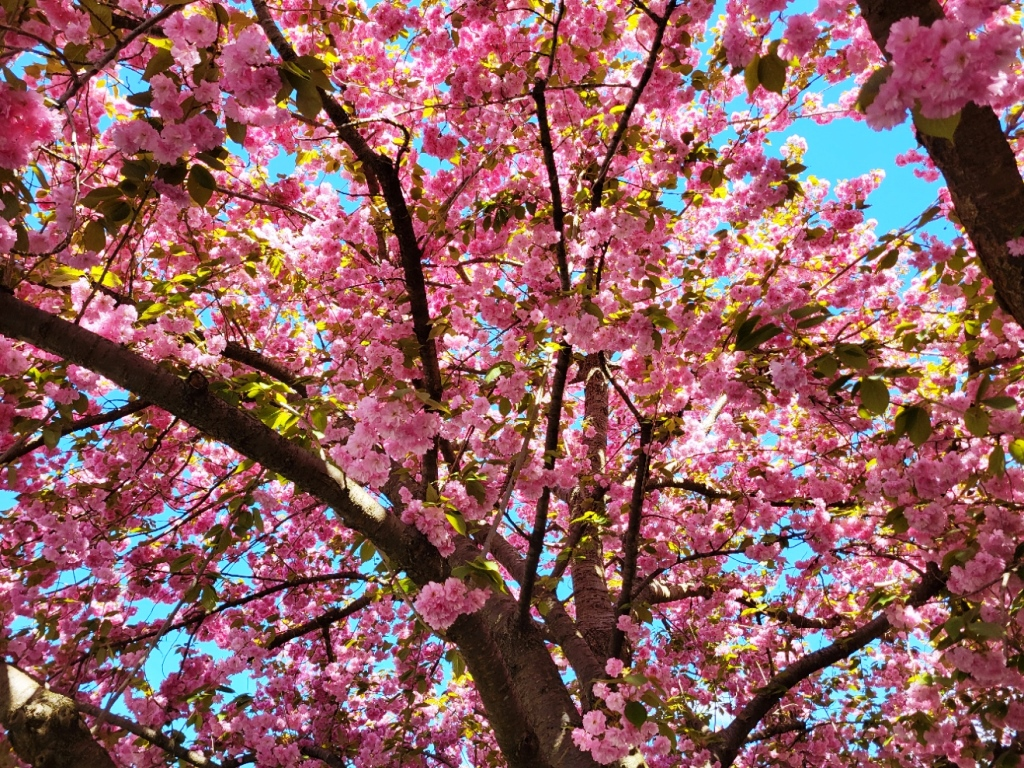
View of the inner canopy of Kanzan Cherry during floom bloom.

'Kanzan' has pink petals, which are thought to have unexpectedly inherited the characteristics of the white Oshima cherry. The petals of the common Oshima cherry are white, but in rare cases, the petals are slightly pink due to the effect of anthocyanin, a biological pigment, and the petals are sometimes dark pink due to exposure to low temperature just before the flowers fall. The pink colour of the Oshima cherry is generally suppressed in the wild, but it is thought that a mutation occurred during selection breeding to produce pink individuals, and then kanzan was produced.

'Kanzan' is the most popular Japanese cherry tree cultivar for cherry blossom viewing in Europe and North America. Compared with Yoshino cherry, a representative Japanese cultivar, it is popular because it grows well even in cold regions, is small and easy to plant in the garden, and has large flowers and deep pink petals. In the city of Bonn, Germany, there is a row of cherry trees where 300 'kanzan' trees were planted in the late 1980s. In Western countries, 'Pink Perfection' and 'Royal Burgundy' originating from Kanzan have been created.
