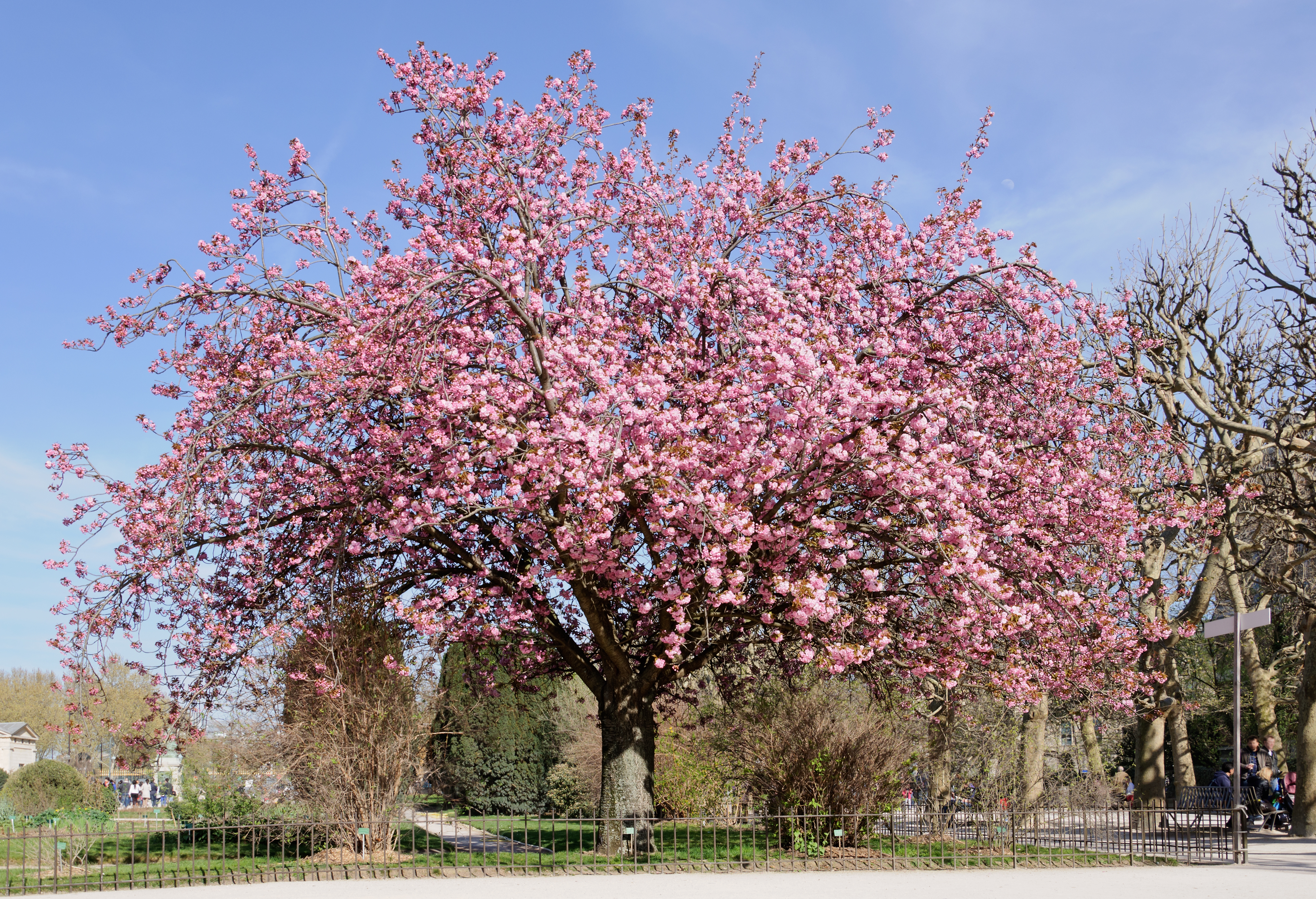
- Prunus serrulata 'Kanzan' in bloom at Jardin des Plantes, Paris, France.

Scientific classification
- Kingdom: Plantae
- Clade: Tracheophytes
- Clade: Angiosperms
- Clade: Eudicots
- Clade: Rosids
- Order: Rosales
- Family: Rosaceae
- Genus: Prunus
- Subgenus: Prunus subg. Cerasus
- Section: P. sect. Cerasus
- Species: P. serrulata

Binomial name
- Prunus serrulata Lindl.

Synonyms
- Cerasus maeda Lavallée; Cerasus montana Siebold ex Miq., nom. nud.; Cerasus serrulata var. florepleno K.Koch ex G.Kirchn., not validly publ.; Cerasus serrulata var. taishanensis Yi Zhang & C.D.Shi; Cerasus serrulata (Lindl.) Loudon; Padus serrulata (Lindl.) S.Ya.Sokolov; Prunus angustissima Nakai; Prunus cerasus var. floresimplici Thunb., not validly publ.; Prunus hupehensis Ingram; Prunus koraiensis Nakai ex T.Kawamoto; Prunus leveilleana var. koraiensis (Nakai ex T.Kawamoto) H.S.Kim; Prunus mume var. crasseglandulosa Miq. ex Koehne; Prunus pseudocerasus var. serrulata (Lindl.) Makino; Prunus pseudocerasus A.Gray, nom. illeg.; Prunus puddum Miq., nom. illeg.; Prunus serratifolia var. nageri Sprenger, orth. var.; Prunus serratifolia var. ungeri (Sprenger) Sprenger; Prunus serrulata var. hortensis Makino; Prunus serrulata var. hupehensis (Ingram) Ingram; Prunus serrulata var. kumagaya Ingram; Prunus serrulata var. pendula Bean; Prunus serrulata var. shimidsuii Ingram; Prunus serrulata var. shirotae (Koidz.) Ingram; Prunus serrulata var. taishanensis (Yi Zhang & C.D.Shi) Y.H.Tong & N.H.Xia; Prunus serrulata var. ungeri Sprenger; Prunus serrulata var. veitchiana Bean; Prunus wildeniana Koehne

= Prunus serrulata =

Species of tree

Prunus serrulata or Japanese cherry is a species of cherry tree that grows wild in Japan, China, Korea and Vietnam. The term also refers to a cultivar produced from Prunus speciosa (Oshima cherry), a cherry tree endemic in Japan. Historically, the Japanese have developed many cultivars by selective breeding of cherry trees, which are produced by the complicated crossing of several wild species, and they are used for ornamental purposes all over the world. Of these, the cultivars produced by complex interspecific hybrids based on the Oshima cherry are also known as the Cerasus Sato-zakura Group.

== Varieties and form ==
=== Classification ===
The classification of cherry blossoms varies from country to country and from period to period. For example, in the Japanese classification, P. serrulata Lindl. f. albida, P. serrulata var. spontanea, P. serrulata var. pubescens and P. serrulata Lindl. var. sachalinensis, the varieties and form constituting this species, are classified as independent species because of their genetic, morphological, and flowering time differences.

There are several varieties and form (or species):

- Prunus serrulata f. albida (syn. Prunus speciosa). Japan.
- Prunus serrulata var. spontanea or Prunus serrulata f. spontanea (syn. Prunus yamasakura). Japan.

Some books say that P. yamasakura grows wild in China and Korea, but P. leveilleana and P. sargentii were mistaken for P. yamasakura.

- Prunus serrulata var. pubescens (syn. Prunus leveilleana). Japan, Korea, China.
- Prunus serrulata var. sachalinensis (syn. Prunus sargentii). Japan, Korea, eastern Russia, China.

=== Trees and flowers ===
Prunus serrulata is a small deciduous tree with a short single trunk, with a dense crown reaching a height of 7.9–11.9 metres (26–39 ft). The smooth bark is chestnut-brown, with prominent horizontal lenticels. The leaves are arranged alternately, simple, ovate-lanceolate, 5–13 cm long and 2.5–6.5 cm broad, with a short petiole and a serrate or doubly serrate margin. At the end of autumn, the green leaves turn yellow, red or crimson.

The flowers are produced in clusters of two to five together at nodes on short spurs in spring at the same time as the new leaves appear; they are white to pink, with five petals in the wild type tree. Its fruit, the sakuranbo, has differences from the Prunus avium in that sakuranbo are smaller in size and more bitter in taste; the sakuranbo is a globose black drupe 8–10 mm in diameter. Owing to their bitter taste, the raw sakuranbo is unpalatable and rarely eaten; instead, the seed inside is removed and the fleshy part preserved.

Because of its evolution, the fruit developed merely as a small, ovoid cherry-like fruit, but it doesn't develop past a small amount of fleshy mass around the seed; as P. serrulata was bred for its flowers, its fruits do not enlarge the way cherry varieties bred for their fruit do.

== Cultivars ==
Among the Prunus serrulata, many cultivars derived from Japanese endemic Prunus speciosa (Oshima cherry), are widely grown as a flowering ornamental tree, both in Japan and throughout the temperate regions of the world. Numerous cultivars have been selected, many of them with double flowers with the stamens replaced by additional petals. According to an unprecedented and detailed DNA study conducted by the Forestry and Forest Products Research Institute in 2014, many of the cherry blossom cultivars used for hanami around the world were derived from the complicated hybridization of wild species such as P. sargentii, P. itosakura, P. leveilleana, P. apetala, P. incisa and P. campanulata with the Oshima cherry, an endemic species of Japan.

As the population increased in the southern Kanto region during the Kamakura period, Oshima cherries, which were originally from Izu Oshima Island, were brought into Honshu (the main island of Japan) to be cultivated and brought to Kyoto, the capital of Japan. In the Muromachi period, Oshima cherries were crossed with P. yamasakura, and cultivars of Sato-zakura group such as 'Fugenzo' and 'Mikurumakaishi' began to appear. In the Edo period, various double-flowered cultivars were produced and planted on the banks of rivers, on Buddhist temples, in Shinto shrines and in daimyo gardens in urban areas such as Edo, and the common people living in urban areas could enjoy them. In the documents at that time, more than 200 cultivars of cherry trees were recorded, and currently known cultivars of cherry trees such as 'Kanzan' are also mentioned.

In American classification, these cultivars are classified as Prunus serrulata var. lannesiana or Prunus serrulata var. pendula (syn. Prunus lannesiana). However, detailed DNA studies revealed that they were complex interspecific hybrids with the Oshima cherry, so they are classified as the Prunus Sato-zakura group or Cerasus Sato-zakura group.

'Kanzan' is the most popular Japanese cherry tree cultivar for cherry blossom viewing in Europe and North America. Compared with 'Yoshino cherry', a representative Japanese cultivar, it is popular because it grows well even in cold regions, is small and easy to plant in the garden, and has large flowers and deep pink petals. In the city of Bonn, Germany, there is a row of cherry trees where 300 kanzan trees were planted in the late 1980s. In Western countries, 'Pink Perfection' and 'Royal Burgundy' originated in 'Kanzan' have been created.

In some cultivars, the pistil changes like a leaf and loses its fertility, and for example, 'Fugenzo' and 'Ichiyo', can only be propagated by artificial methods such as grafting and cutting.

In cultivation in Europe and North America, it is usually grafted on to Prunus avium roots; the cultivated forms rarely bear fruit. It is viewed as part of the Japanese custom of Hanami.

Some important cultivars include:

- 'Kanzan'. = 'Sekiyama' or 'Kwanzan'. Cerasus Sato-zakura Group 'Sekiyama' Koidz

Flowers pink, double; young leaves bronze-coloured at first, becoming green. Award of Garden Merit.

- 'Amanogawa'.

Fastigiate cherry, with columnar habit; flowers semi-double, pale pink. Award of Garden Merit.

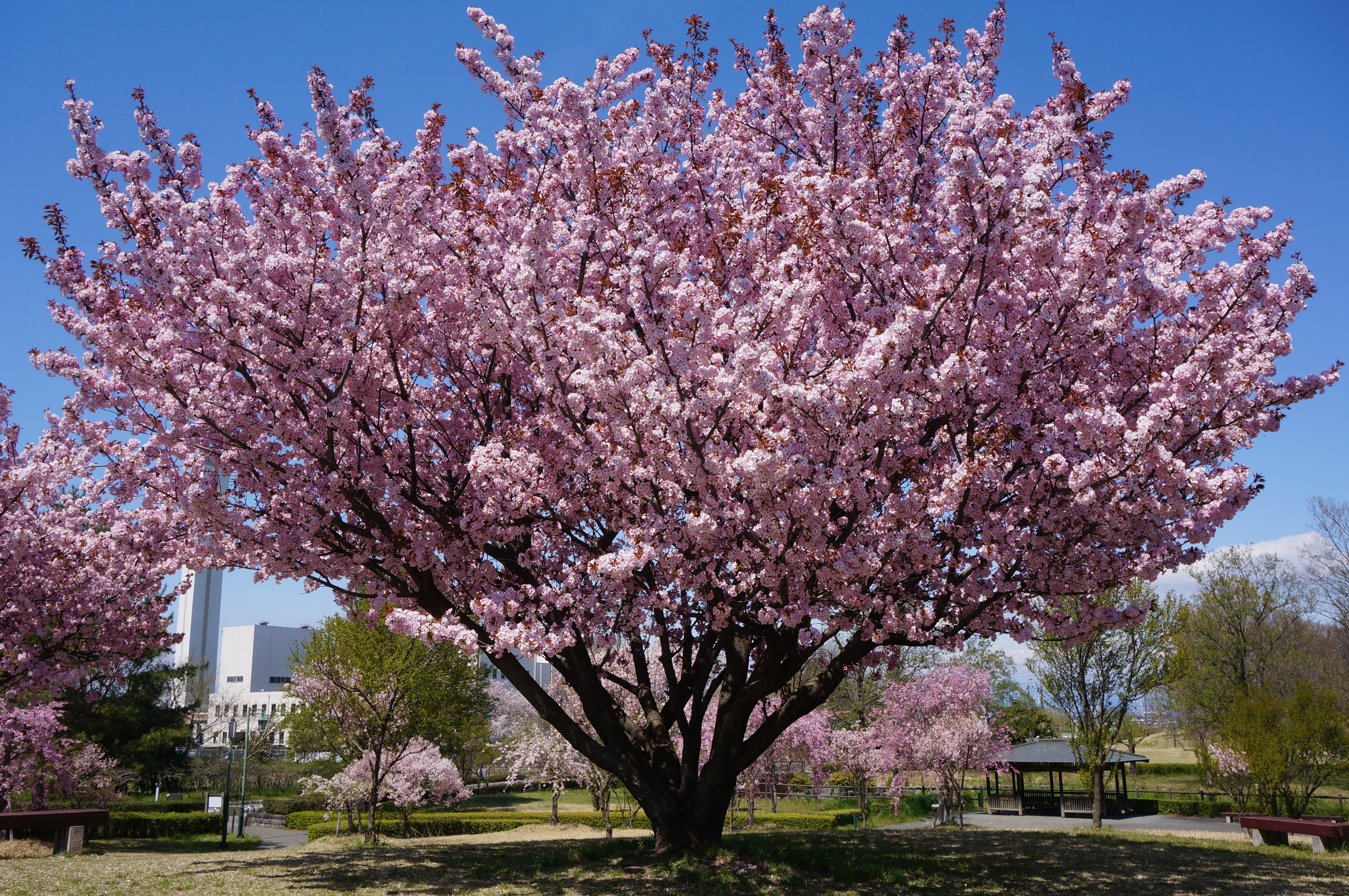
'Choshu-hizakura'

- 'Choshu-hizakura' Also known as 'Kenrokuen-kumagai'. Crasus Sato-zakura Group 'Choshu-hizakura'

Large flowers and red leaves open at the same time. In a DNA study published in 2014, 'Choshu-hizakura' and 'Kenrokuen-magai' were found to be the same clone.

- 'Fugenzo'. = 'Shiro-fugen'. Cerasus Sato-zakura Group 'Albo-rosea' Makino

Flowers double, deep pink at first, fading to pale pink. In Japanese, fugen refers to Samantabhadra and zo refers to an elephant, and the origin of the name comes from the fact that the two pistils, which look like leaves, were likened to the tusks of a white elephant on which Samantabhadra rides. Award of Garden Merit.

- 'Kiku-shidare'.

Cheal's Weeping Cherry. Stems weeping; flowers double, pink. Tends to be short-lived.

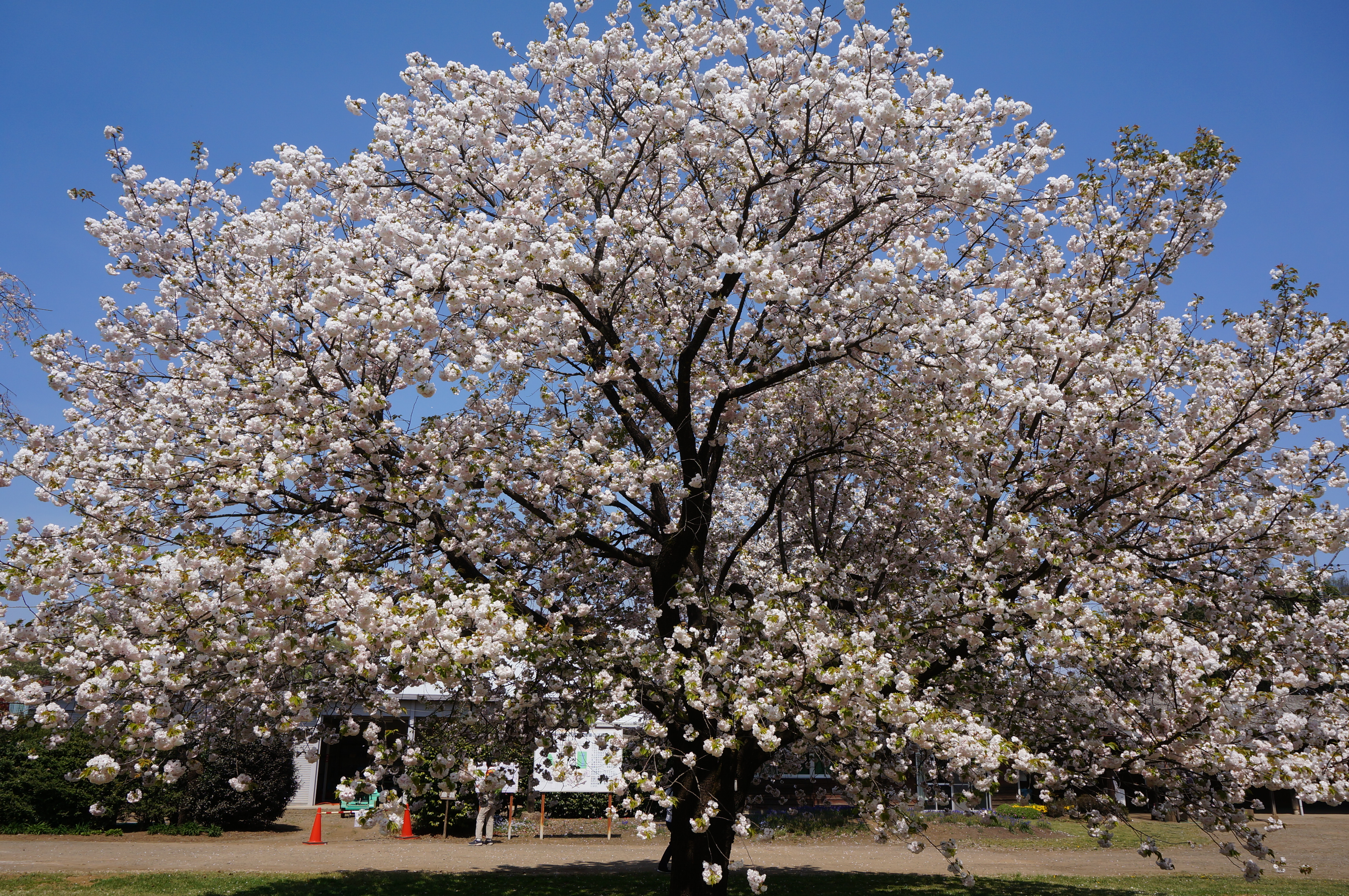
'Ichiyo'

- 'Ichiyo'. Cerasus Sato-zakura Group 'Hisakura' Koehne

Flowers double, pale pink at first, fading to white. The name comes from the fact that only one pistil is changed like a leaf, and ichi (一) means 'one' and yo (葉) means' leaf'. In the Japanese climate, it is one of the cultivars that are likely to become the largest tree among the double-flowered cherry trees derived from Oshima cherry. Award of Garden Merit.

- 'Shirotae'. Mt. Fuji Cherry. Crasus Sato-zakura Group 'Shirotae' Koidz

Very low, broad crown with nearly horizontal branching; flowers pure white, semi-double. Award of Garden Merit.

- 'Taihaku'. Cerasus Sato-zakura Group 'Taihaku' Ingram

Great White Cherry. Flowers single, white, very large (up to 8 cm diameter); young leaves bronze-coloured at first, becoming green. By the beginning of the 20th century it had already ceased to exist in Japan, but Collingwood Ingram, an English man who had imported it from Japan before then, sent it back to Japan in 1932. Award of Garden Merit.

- 'Ukon'. = 'Grandiflora', P. serrulata f. grandiflora Wagner. Cerasus Sato-zakura Group 'Grandiflora' A. Wagner

Green cerry Cherry. Flowers semi-double, cream-white or pale yellow. Young leaves light bronzy-green. Fall leaf color can be purple or rusty-red. 'Ukon' was developed in the Edo period. Award of Garden Merit.

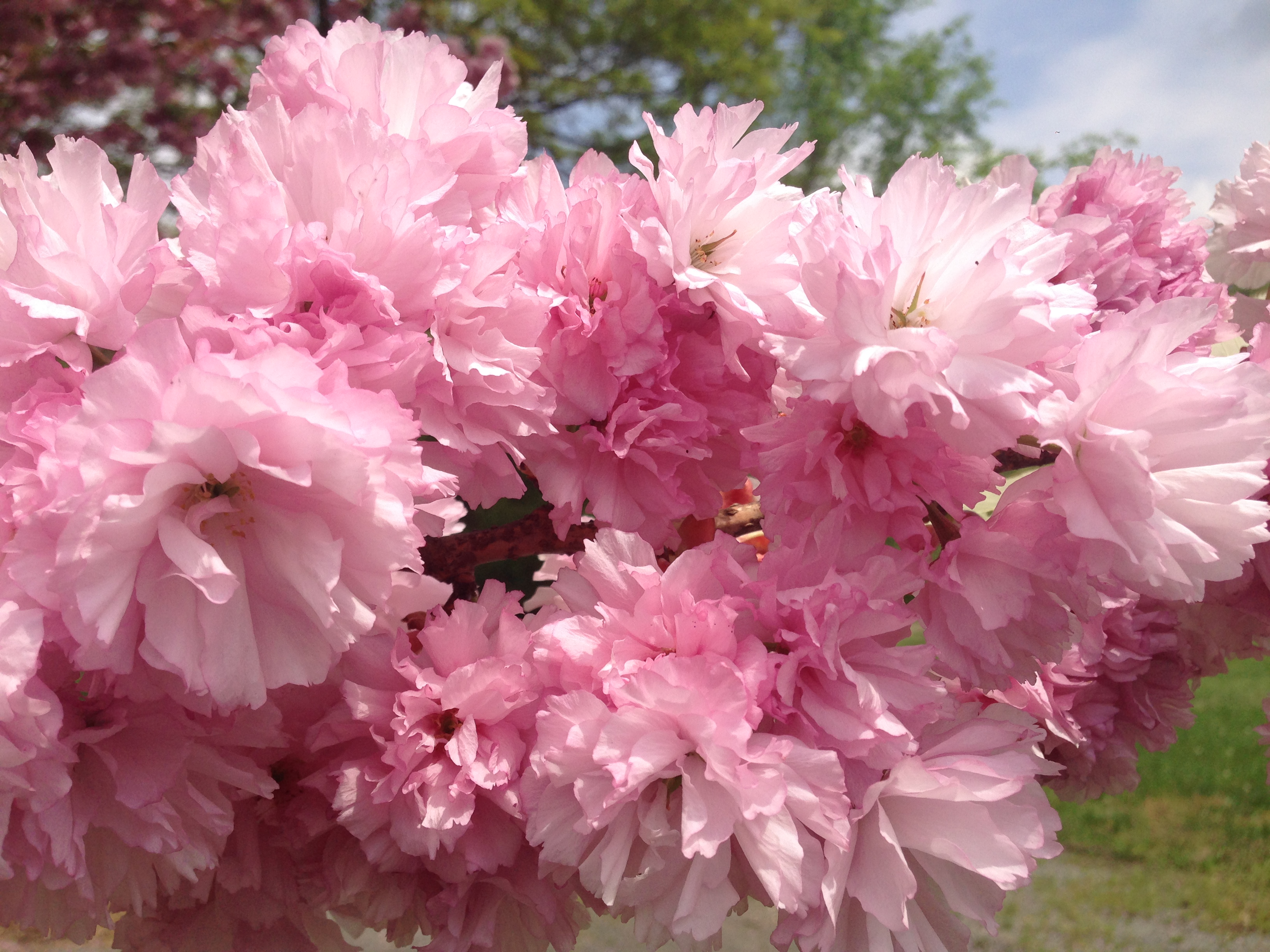
'Kanzan'

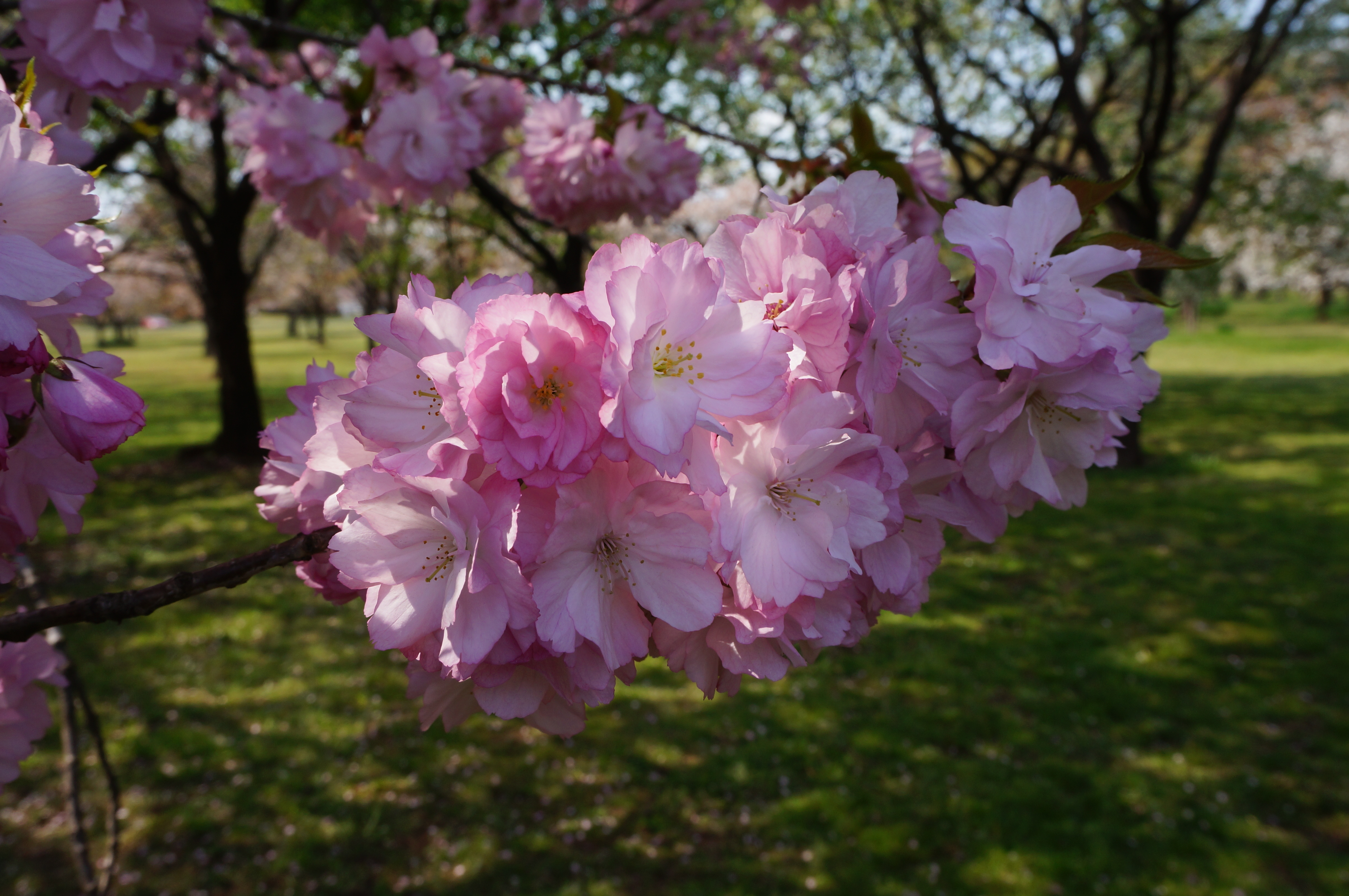
'Beni-yutaka'

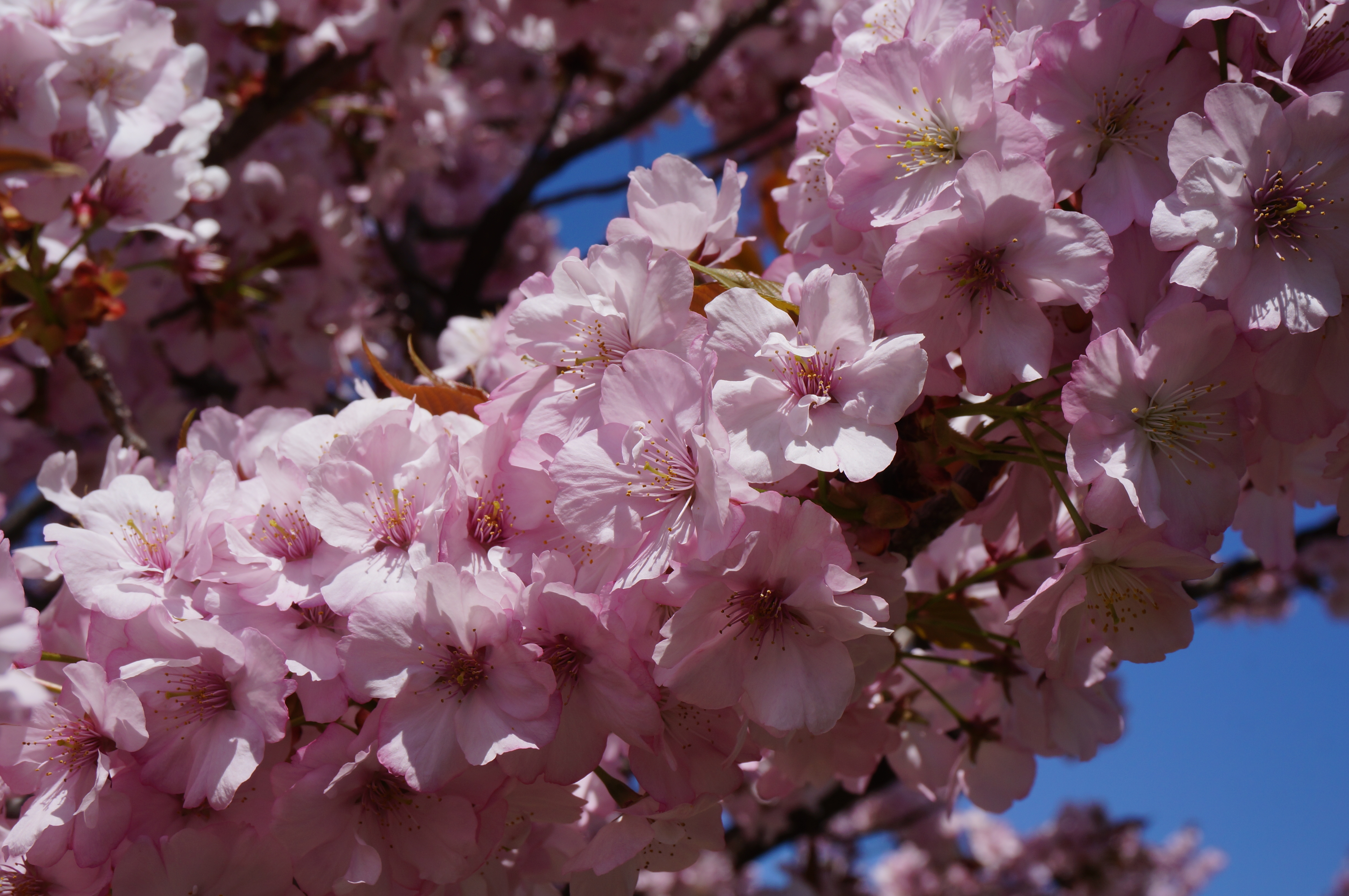
'Choshu-hizakura'

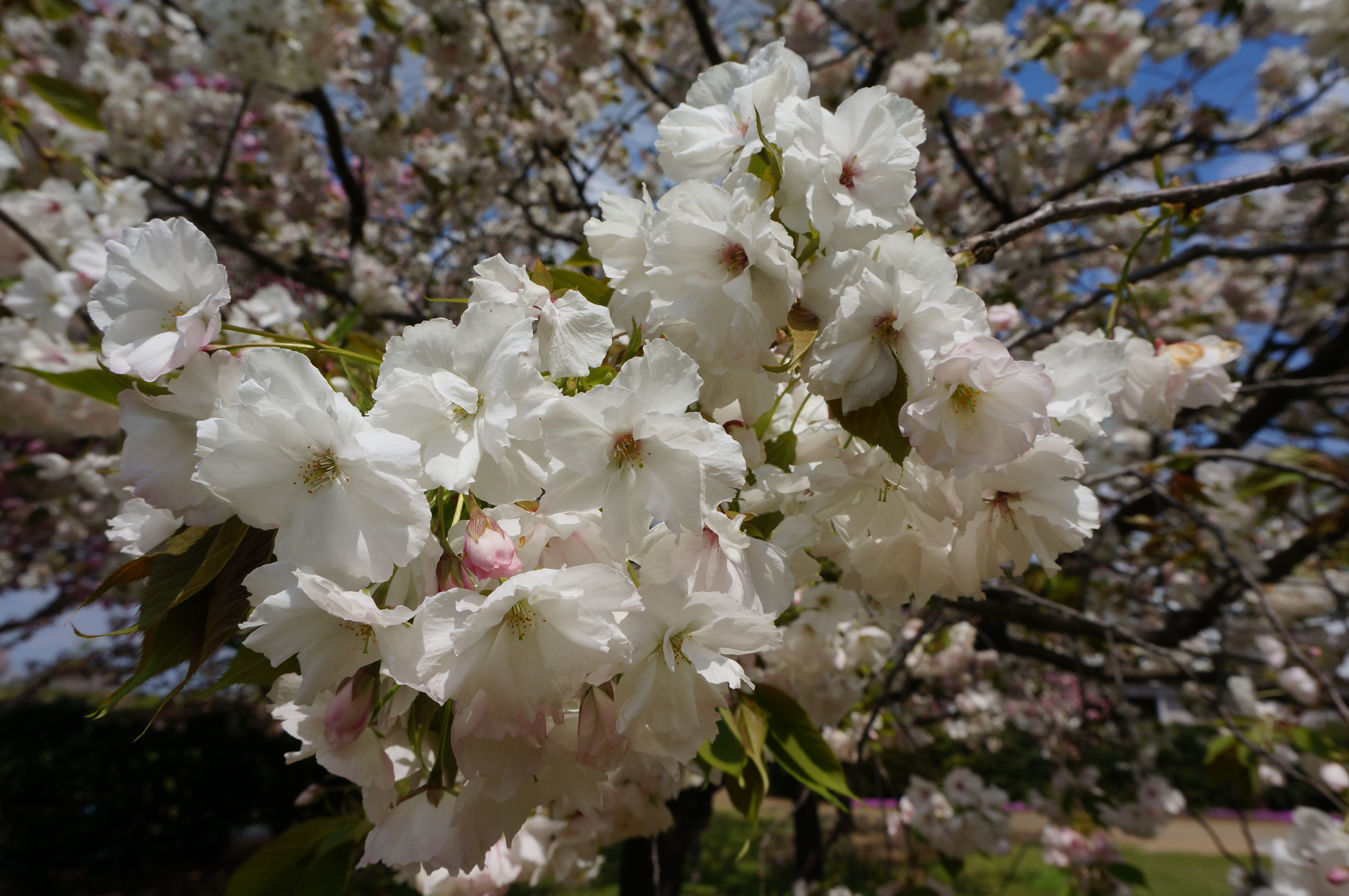
'Eigenji'

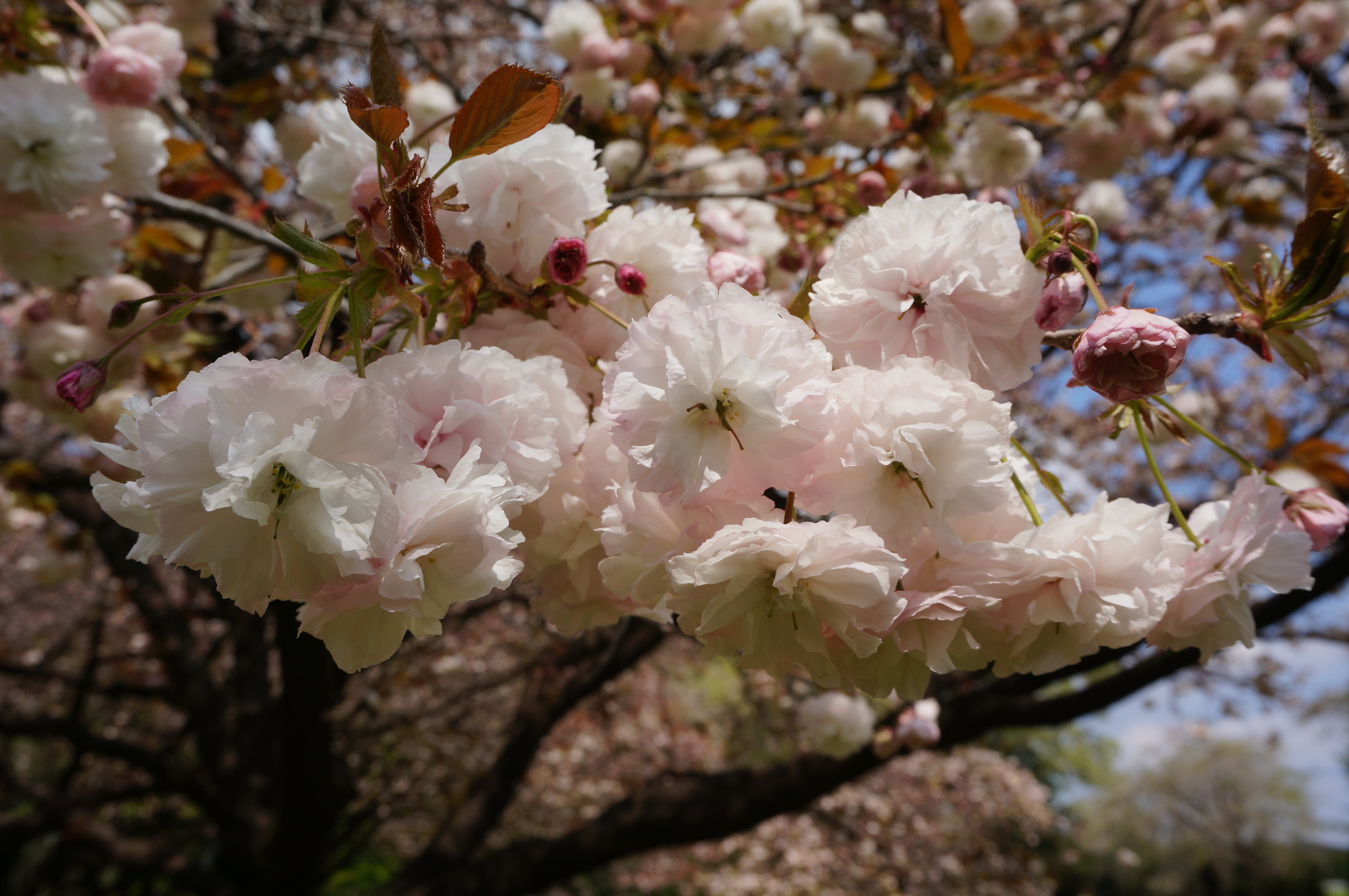
'Fugenzo'

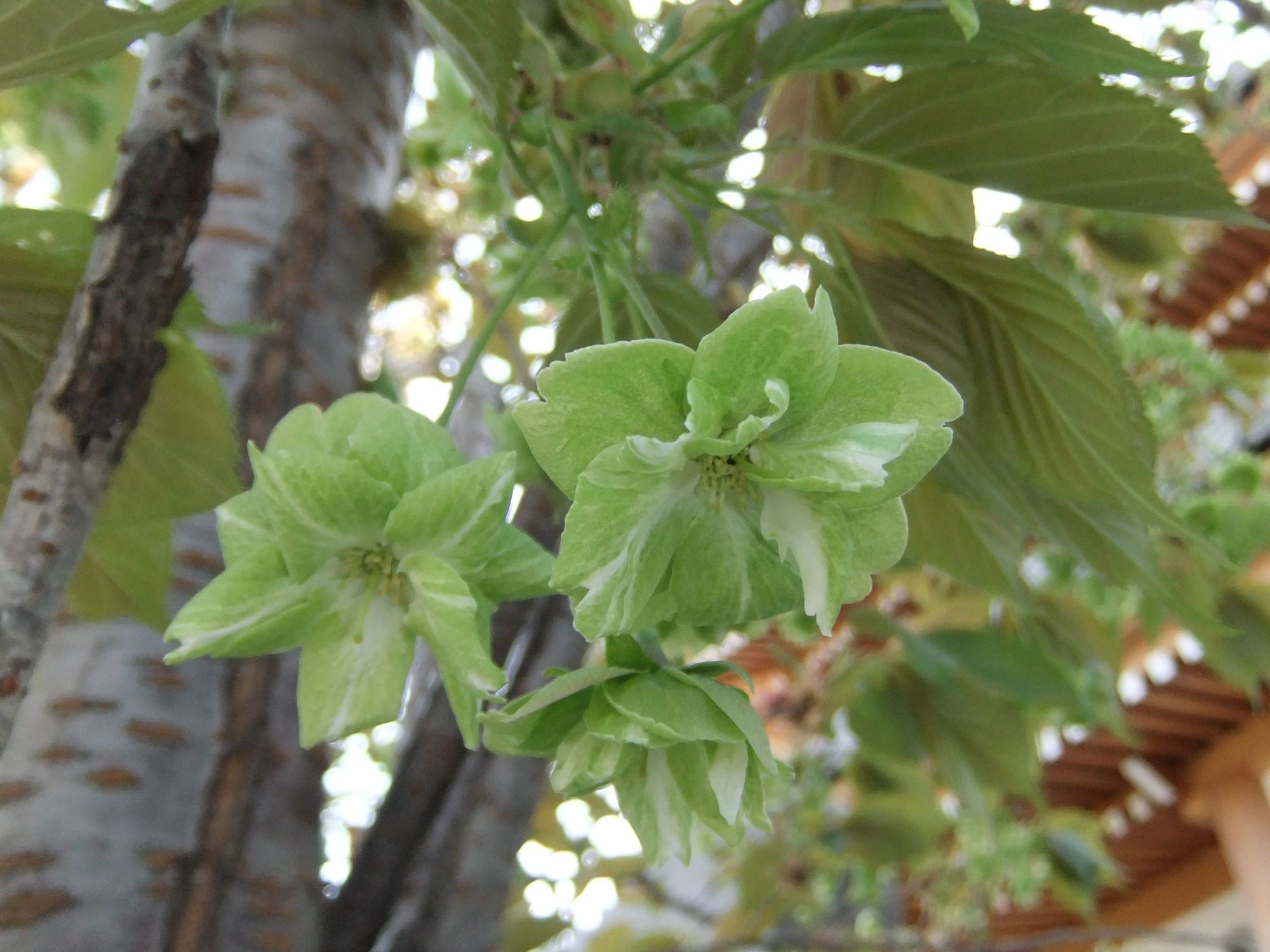
'Gyoiko'

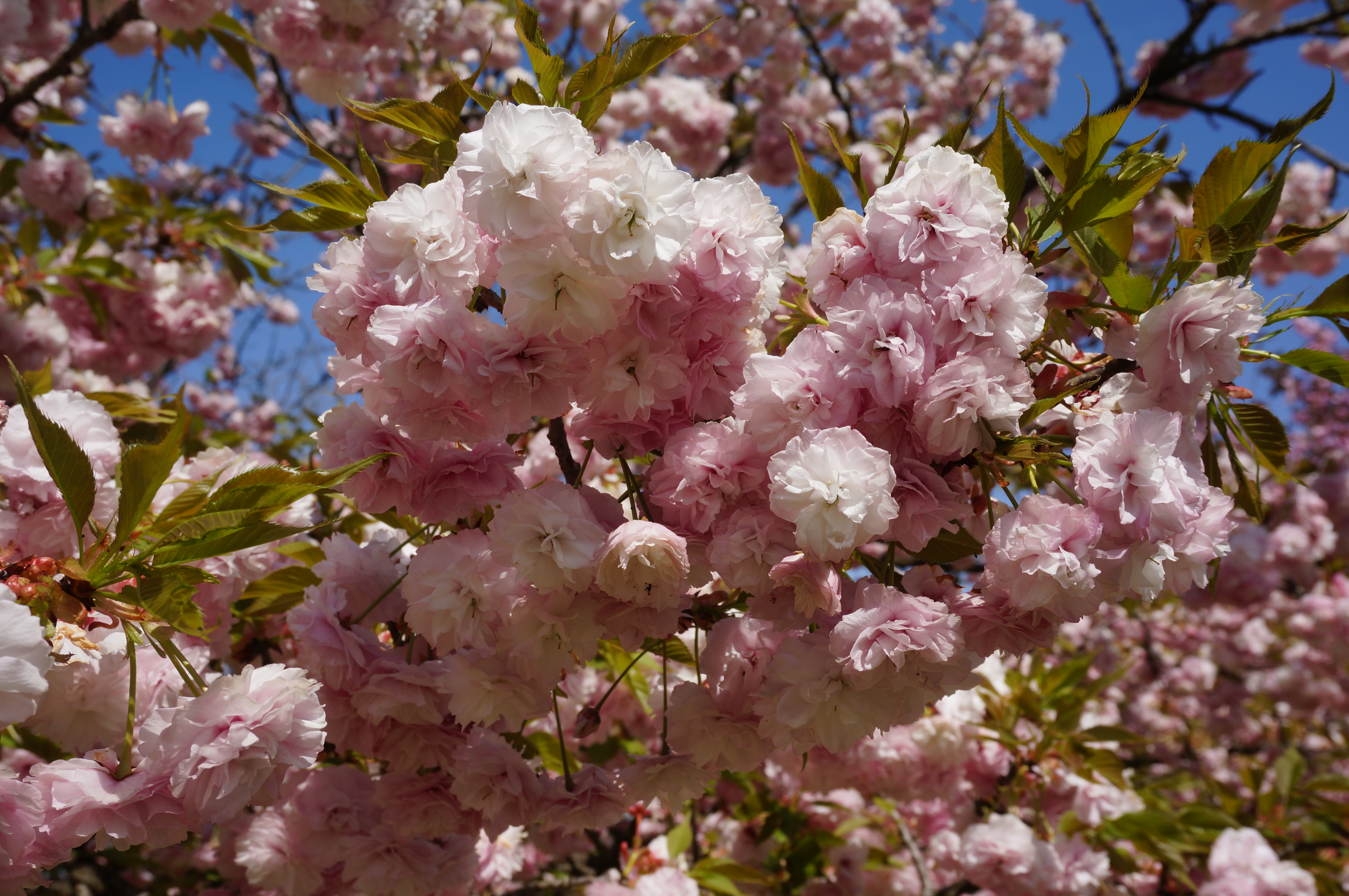
'Hanagasa'

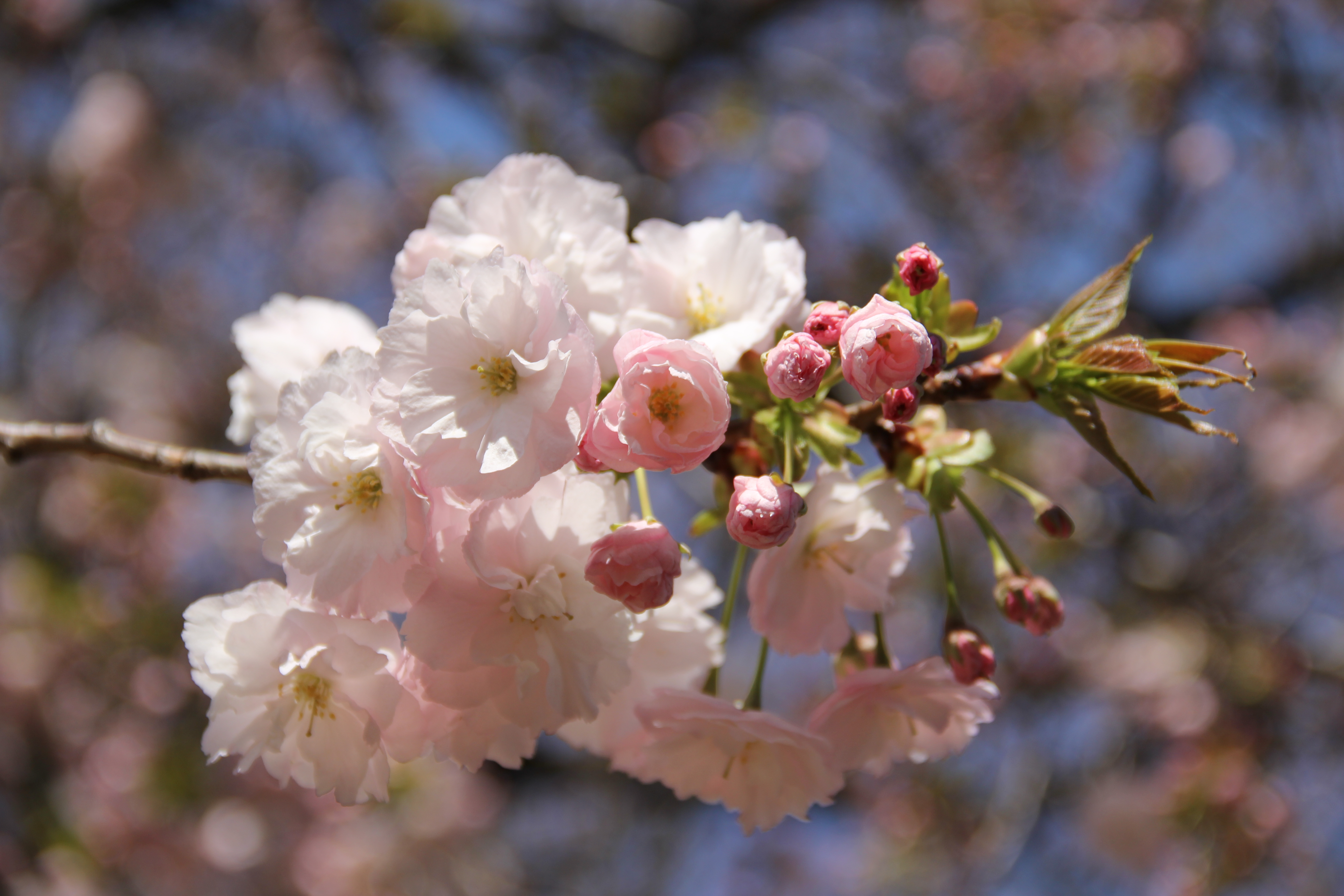
'Ichiyo'

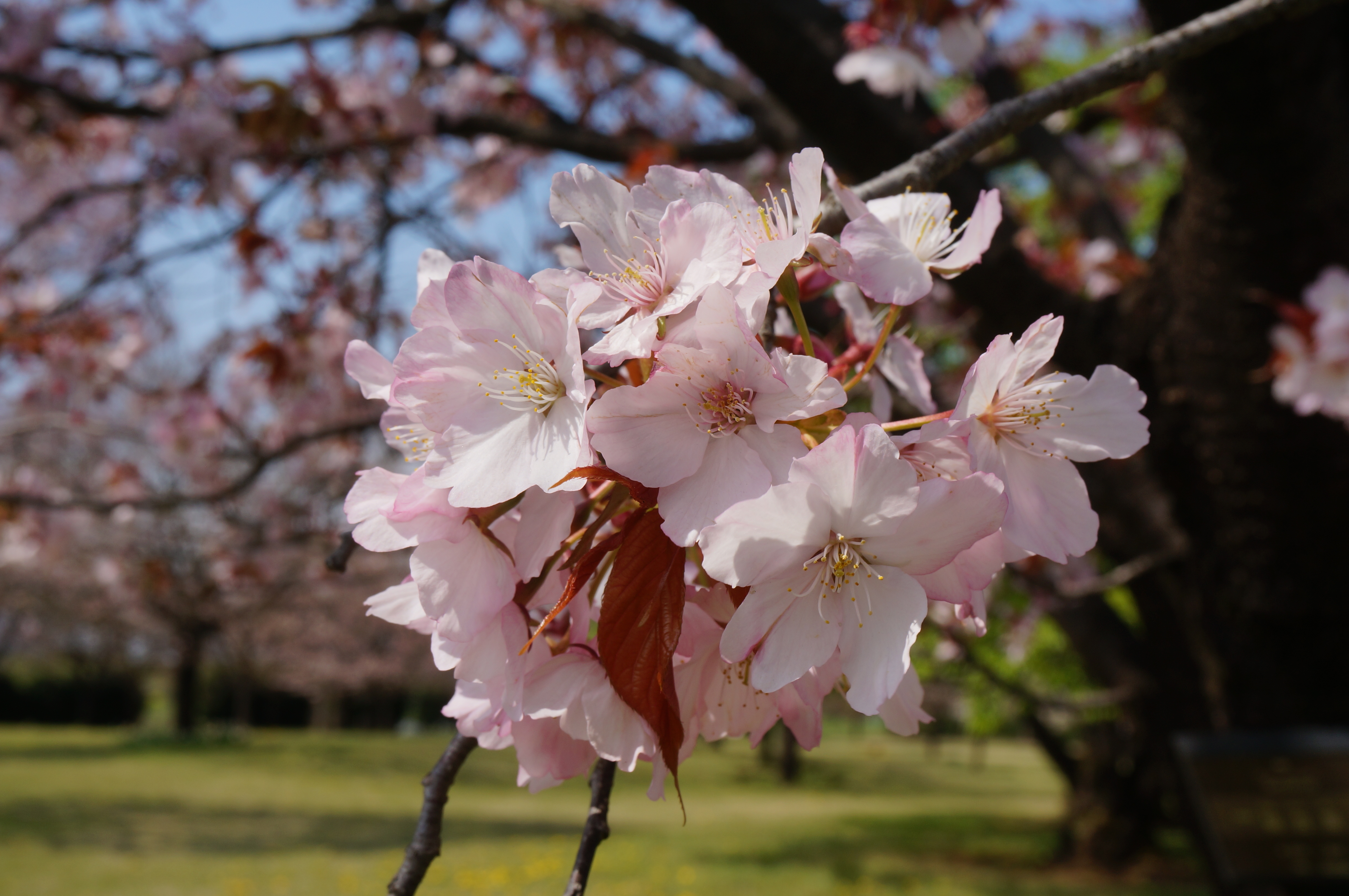
'Sendaiya'

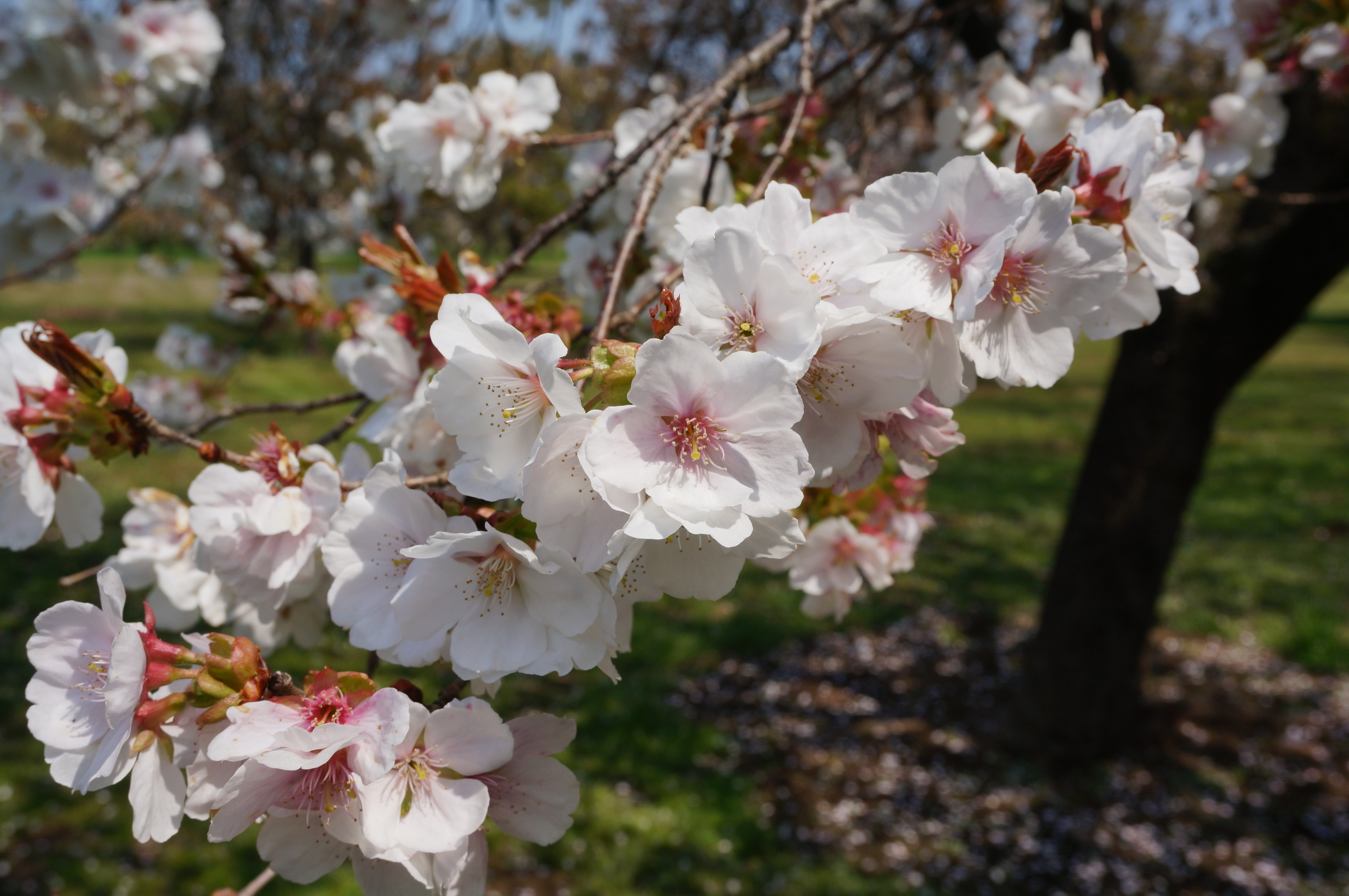
'Shirayuki'

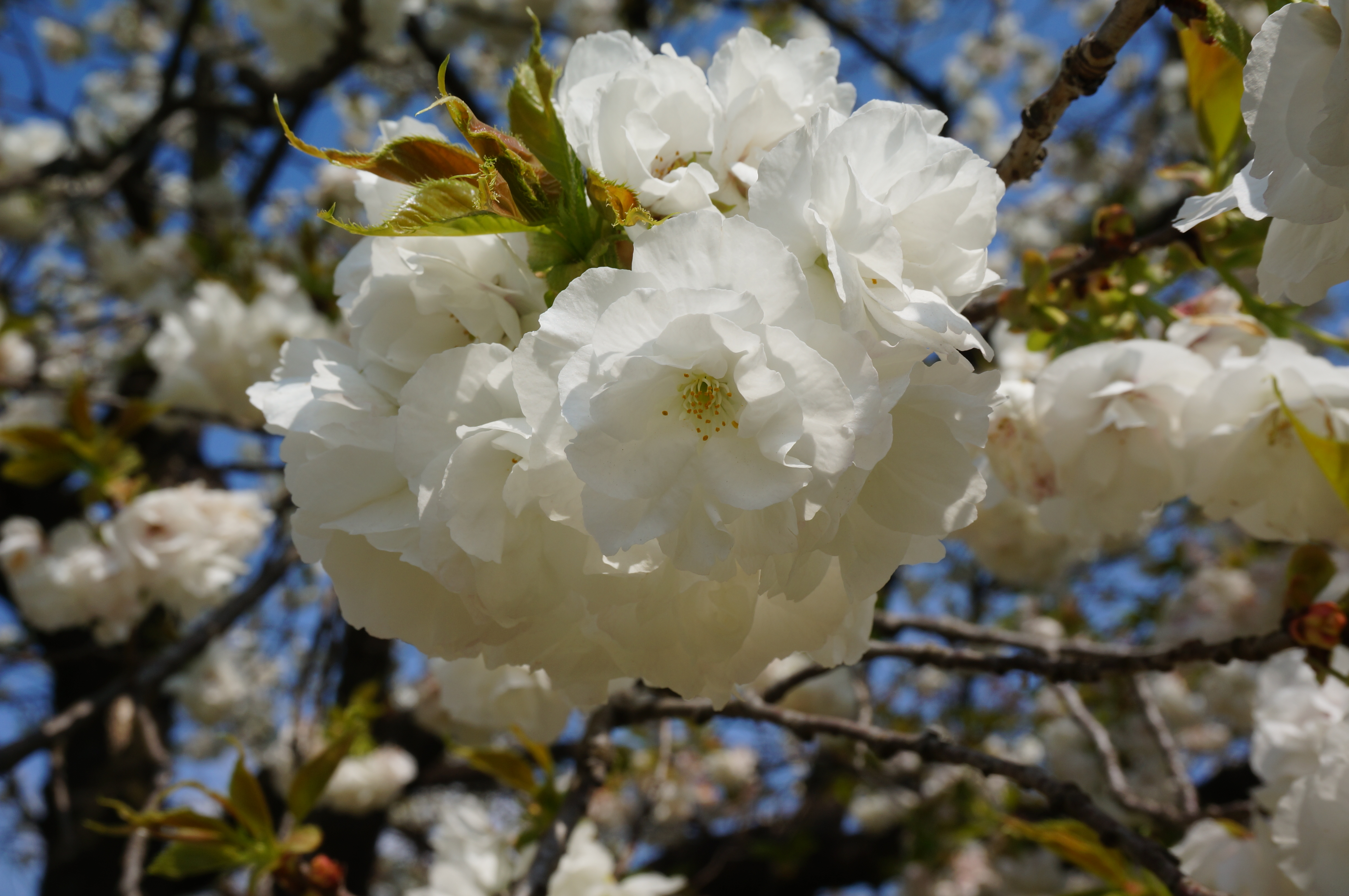
'Shirotae'

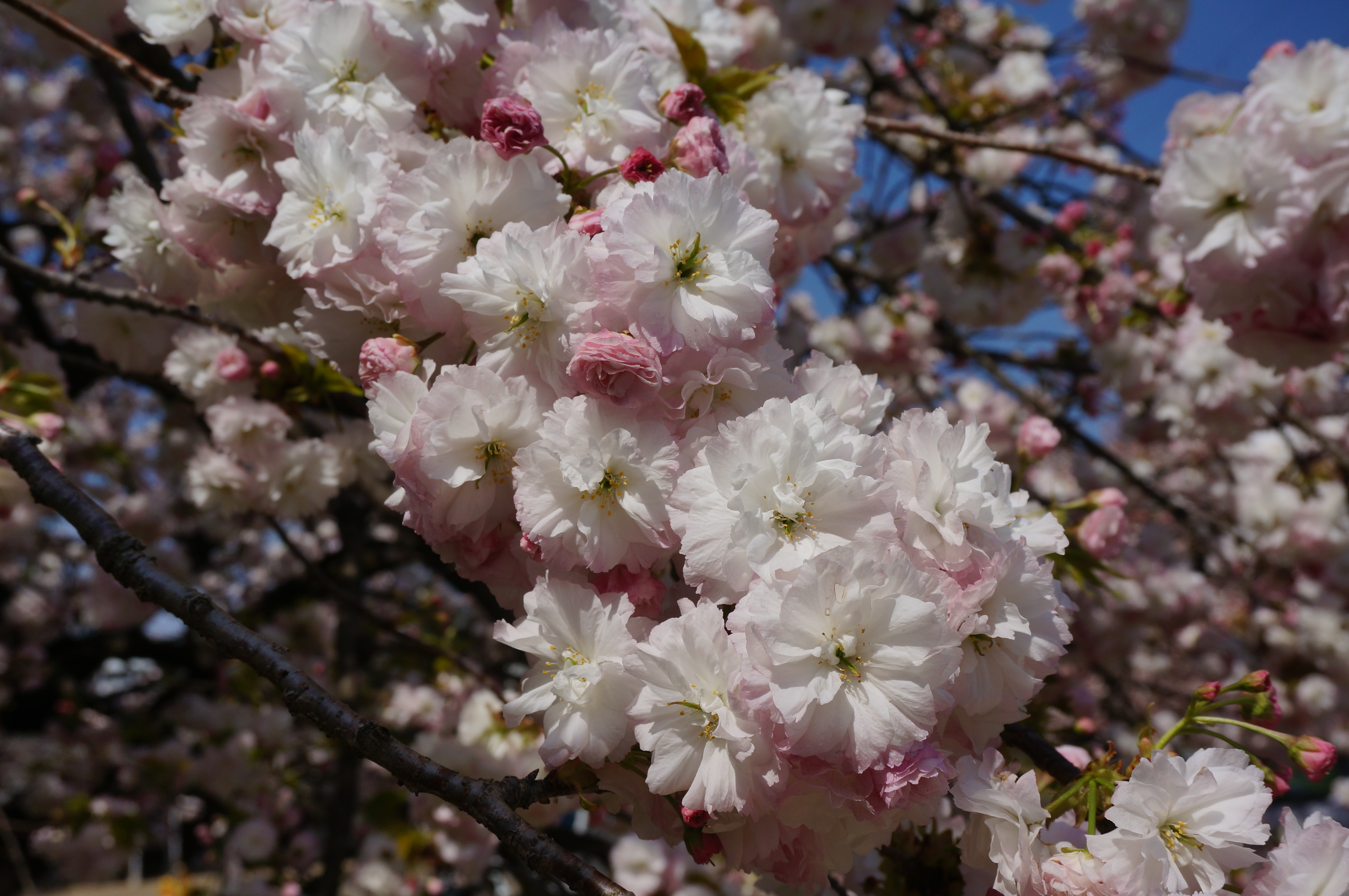
'Shogetsu'

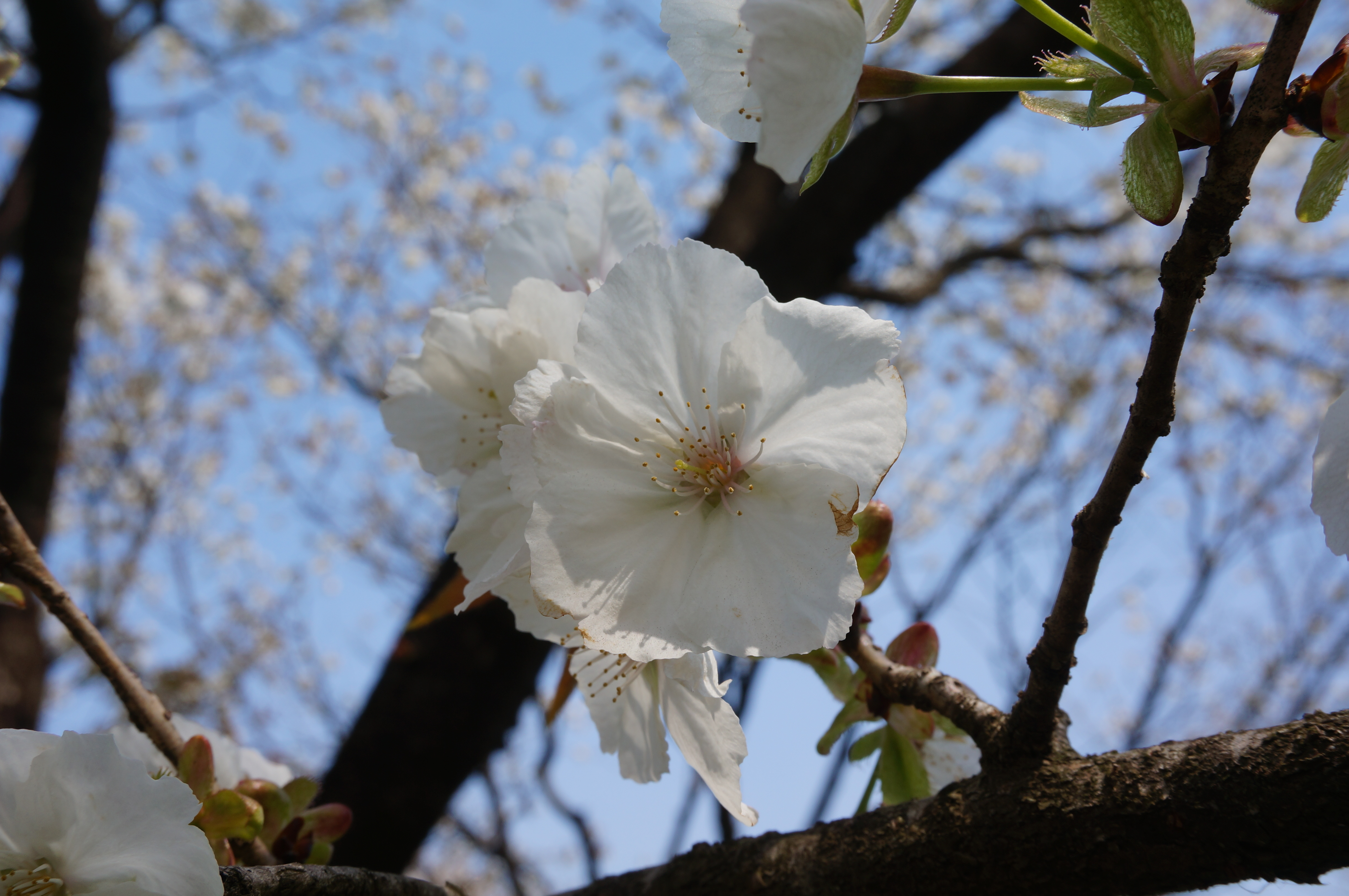
'Taihaku'

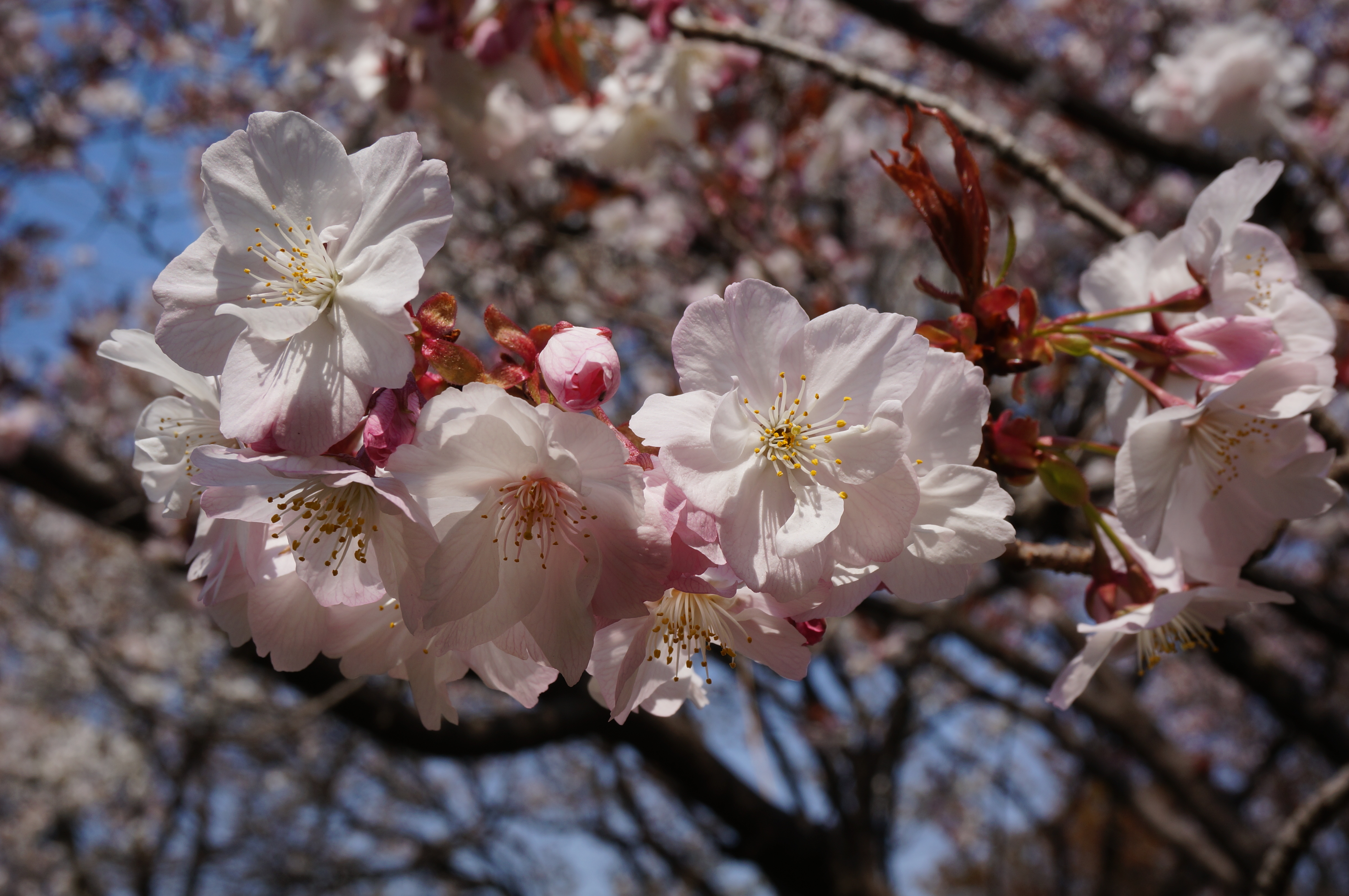
'Taoyame'

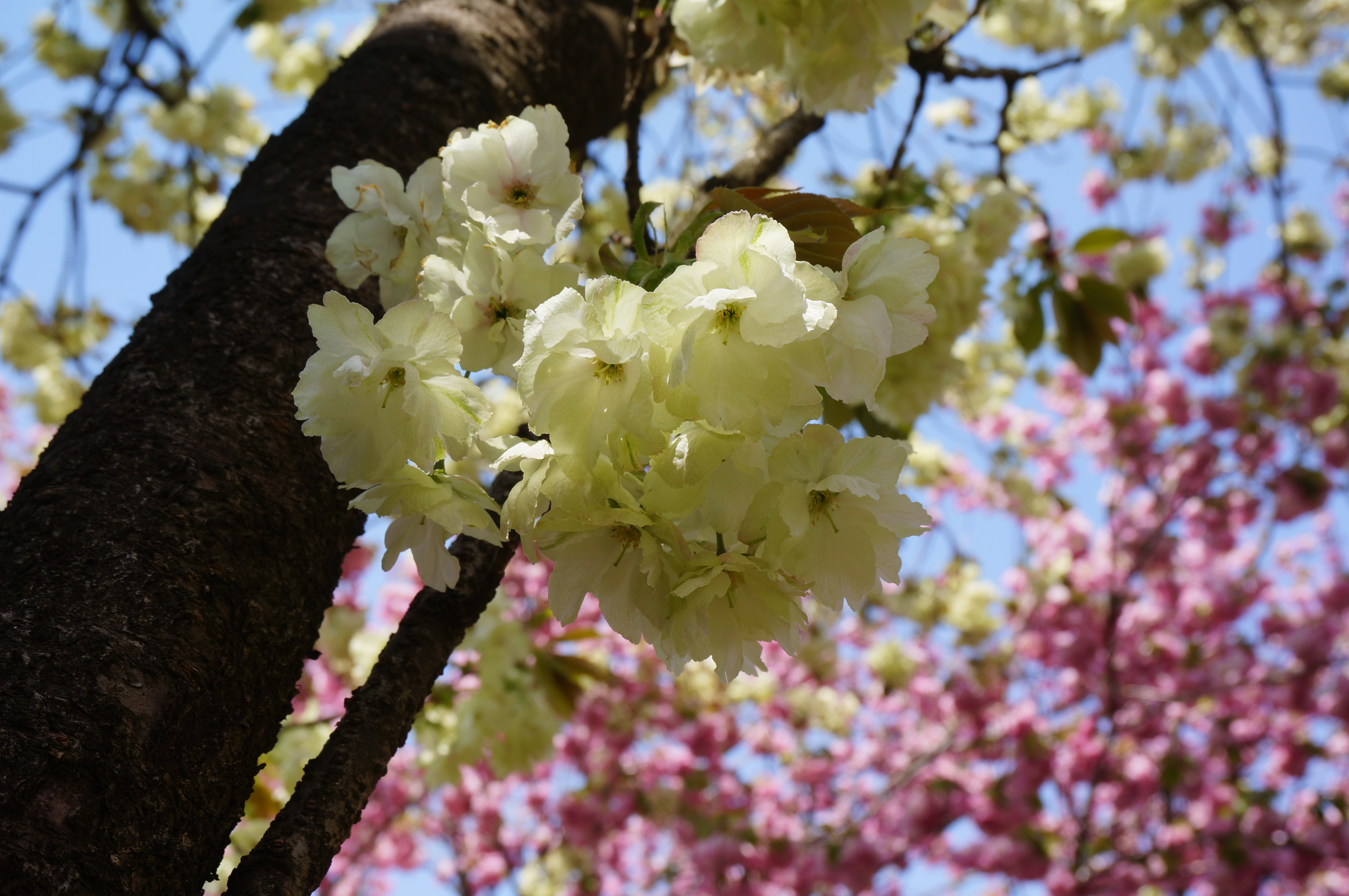
'Ukon'

== Gallery ==
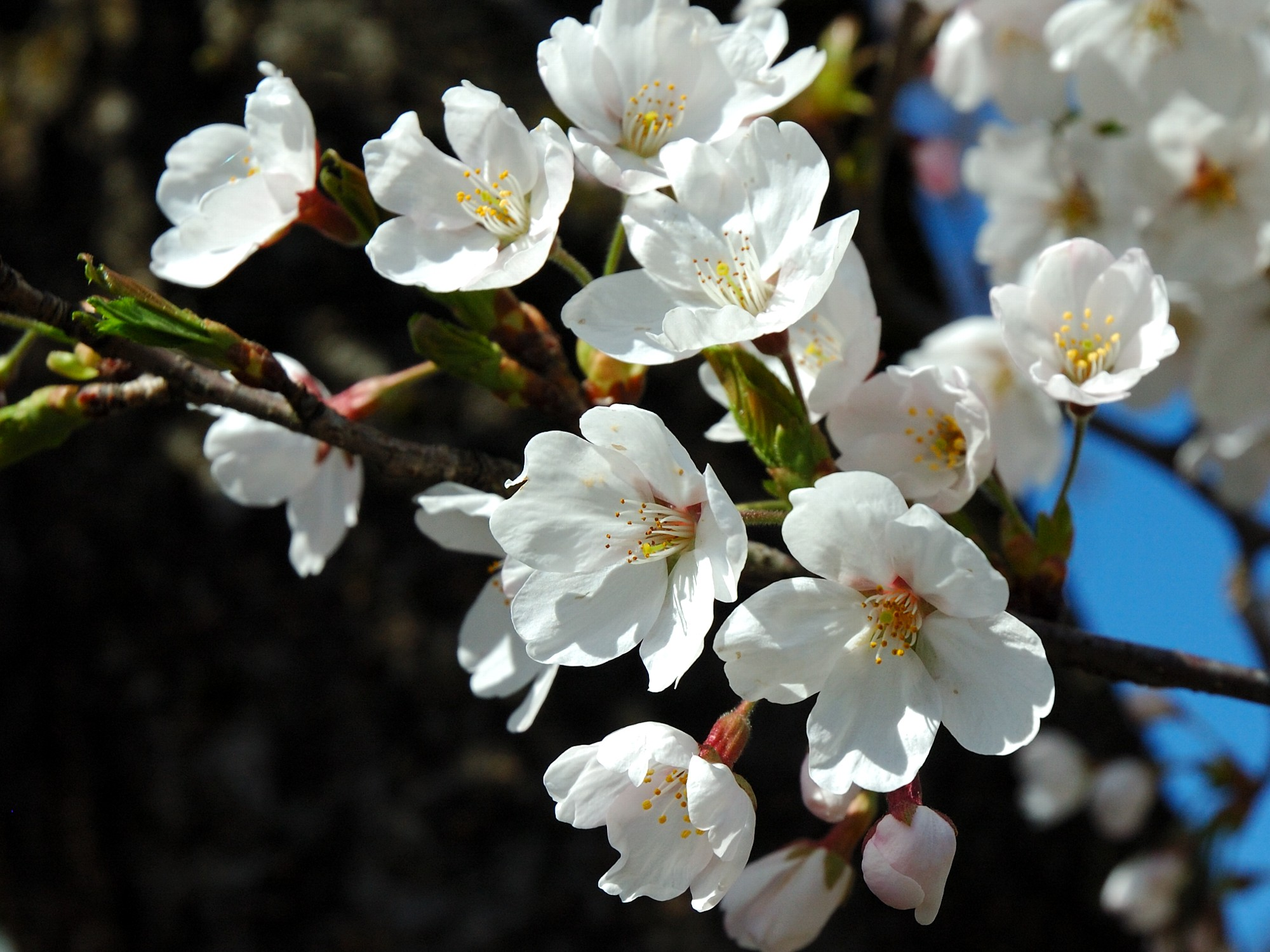
P. serrulata flowers

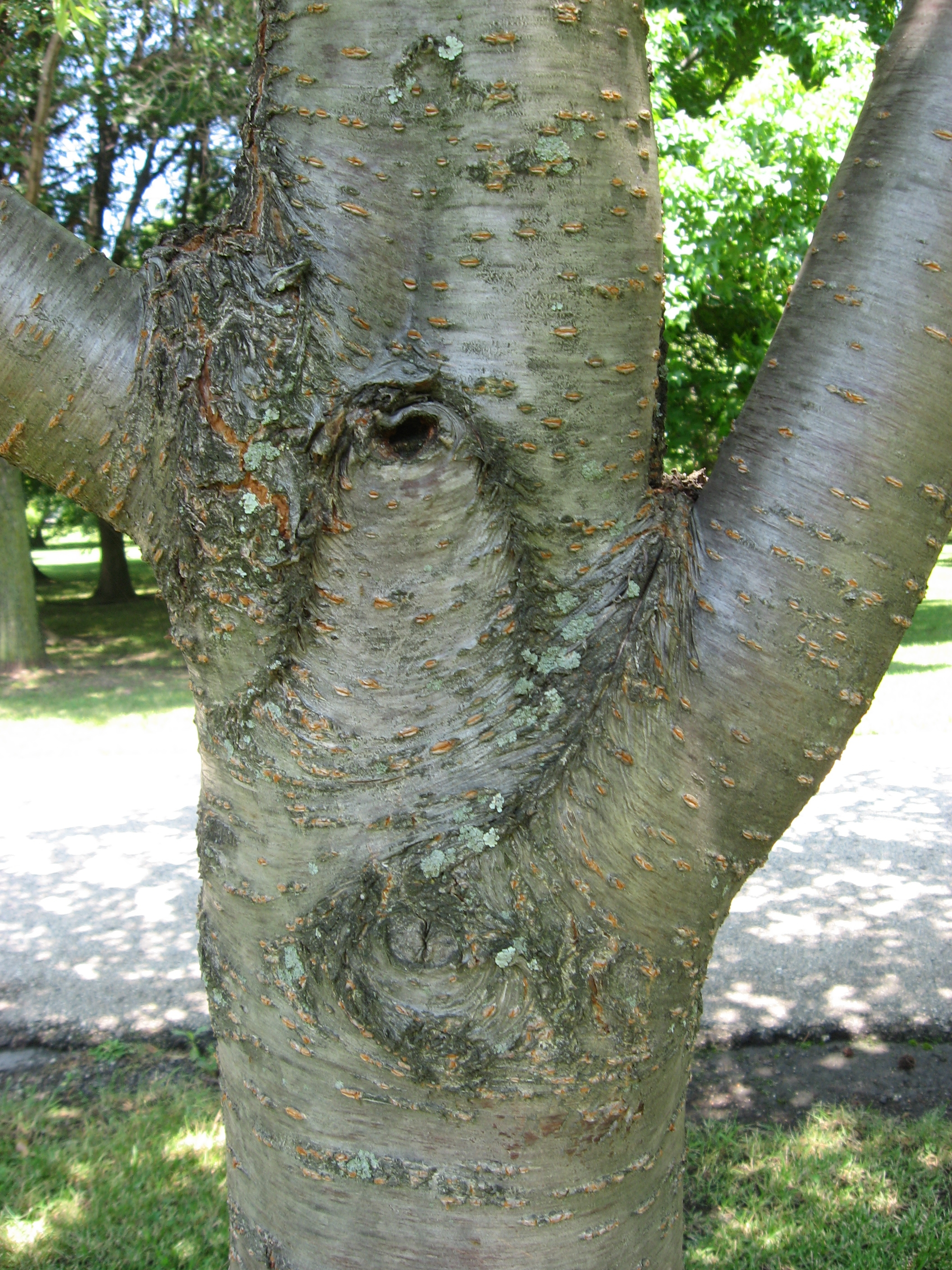
Bark showing lenticels

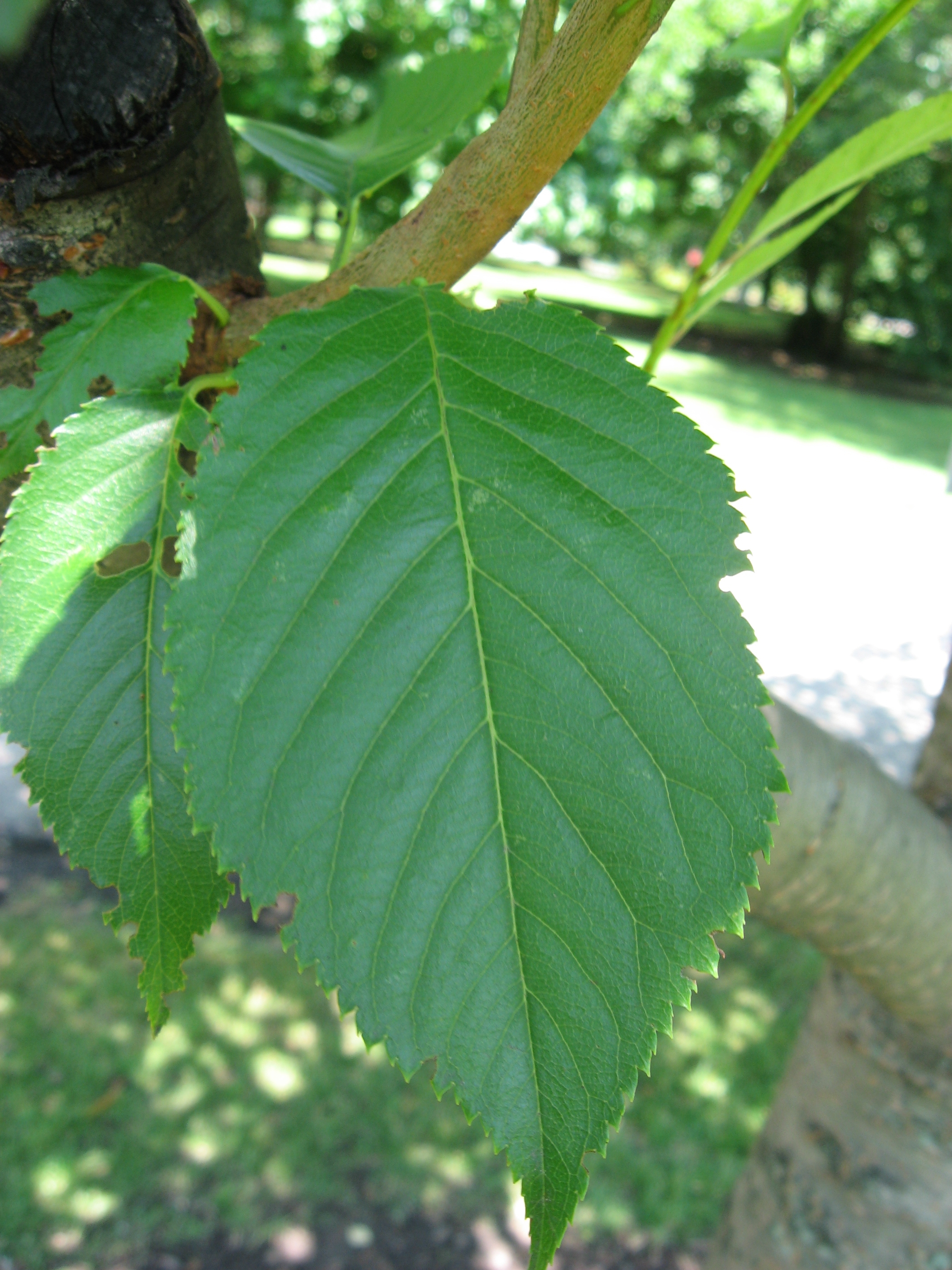
Leaf close up

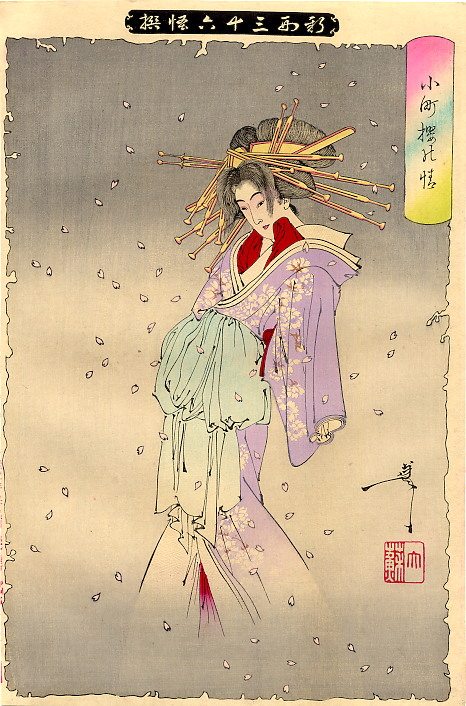
Kurozome, the tree spirit of the Japanese Cherry Tree

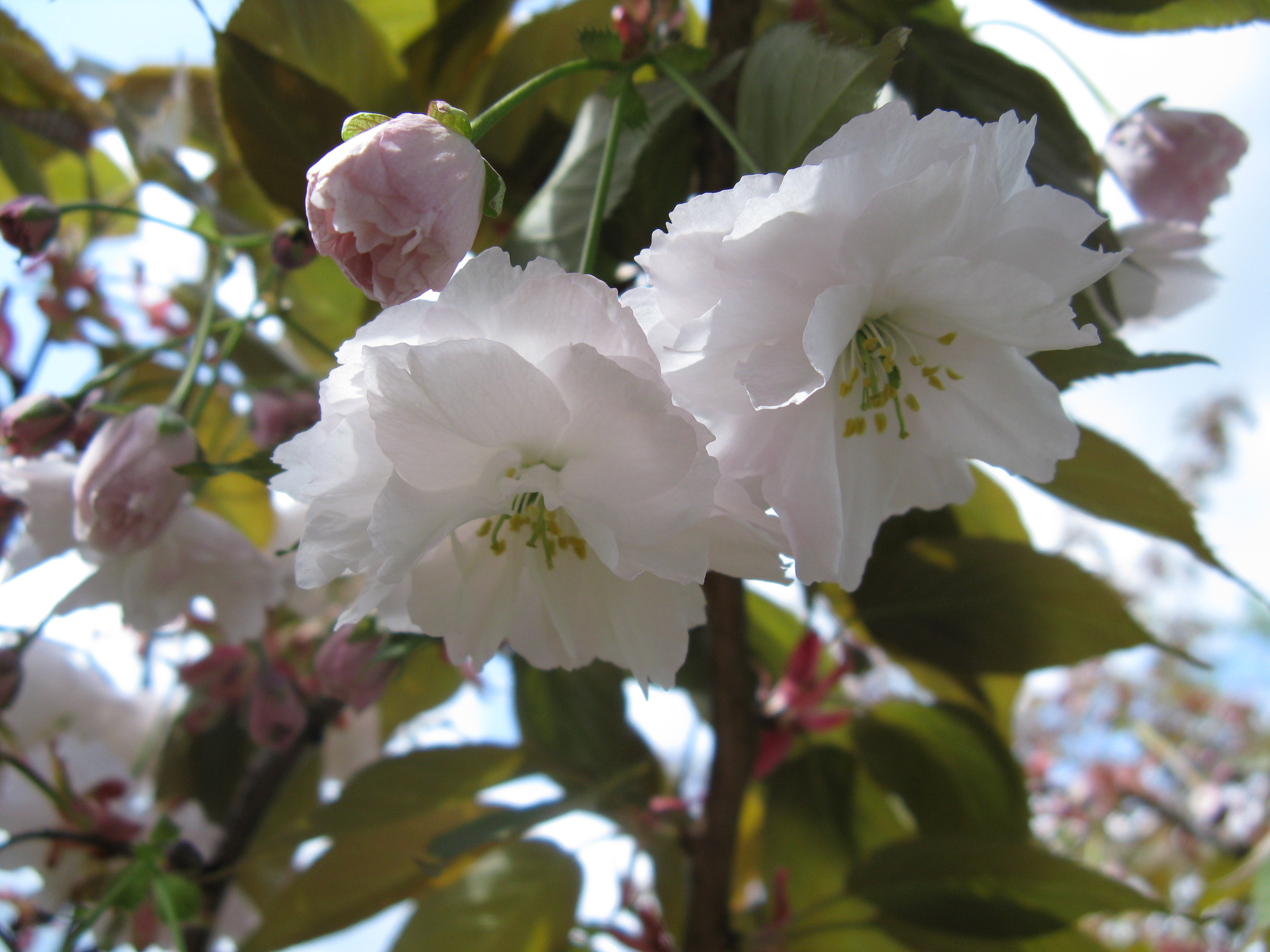
Cultivar flower close up

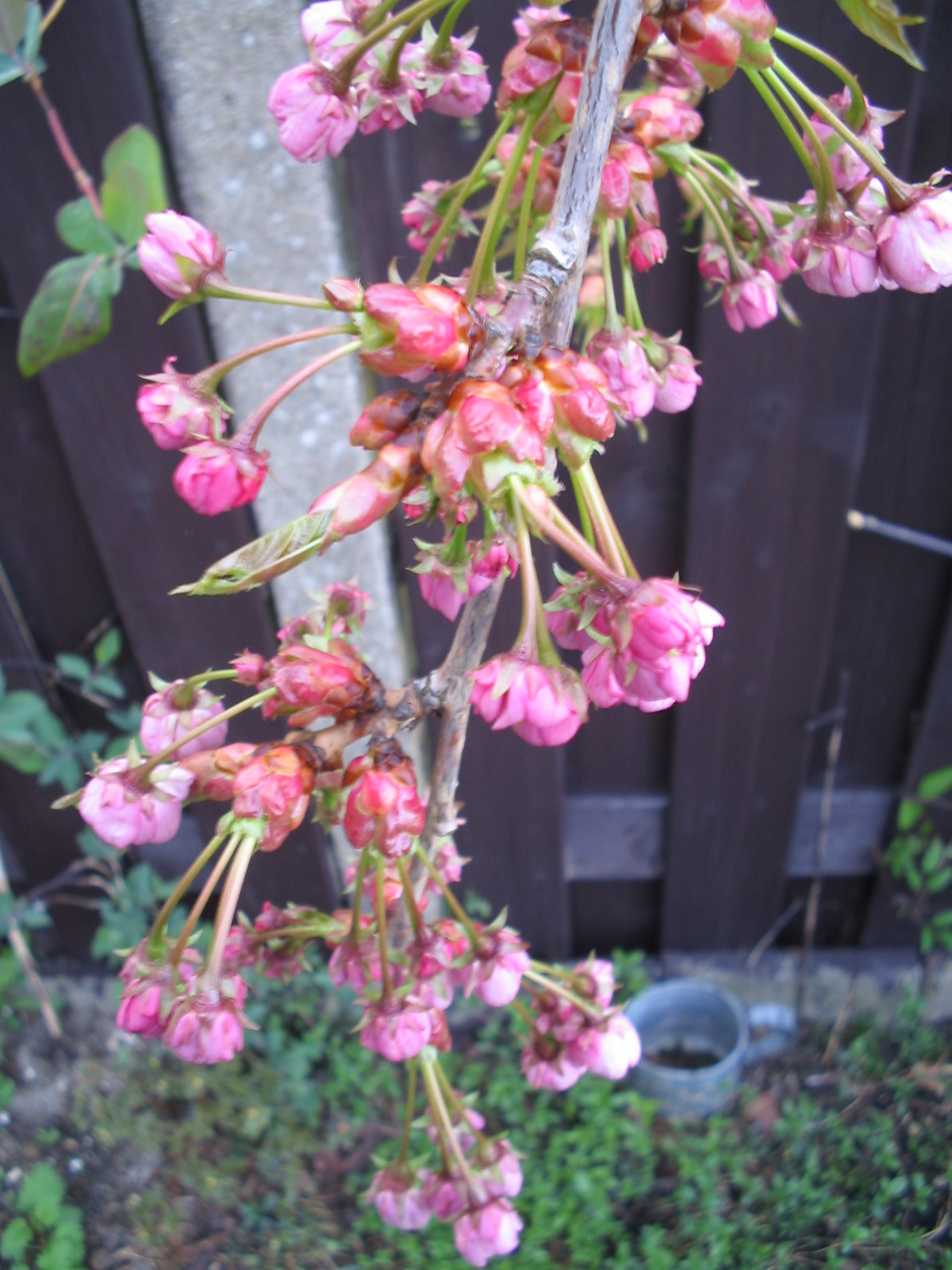
Prunus serrulata – Cherry blossoms

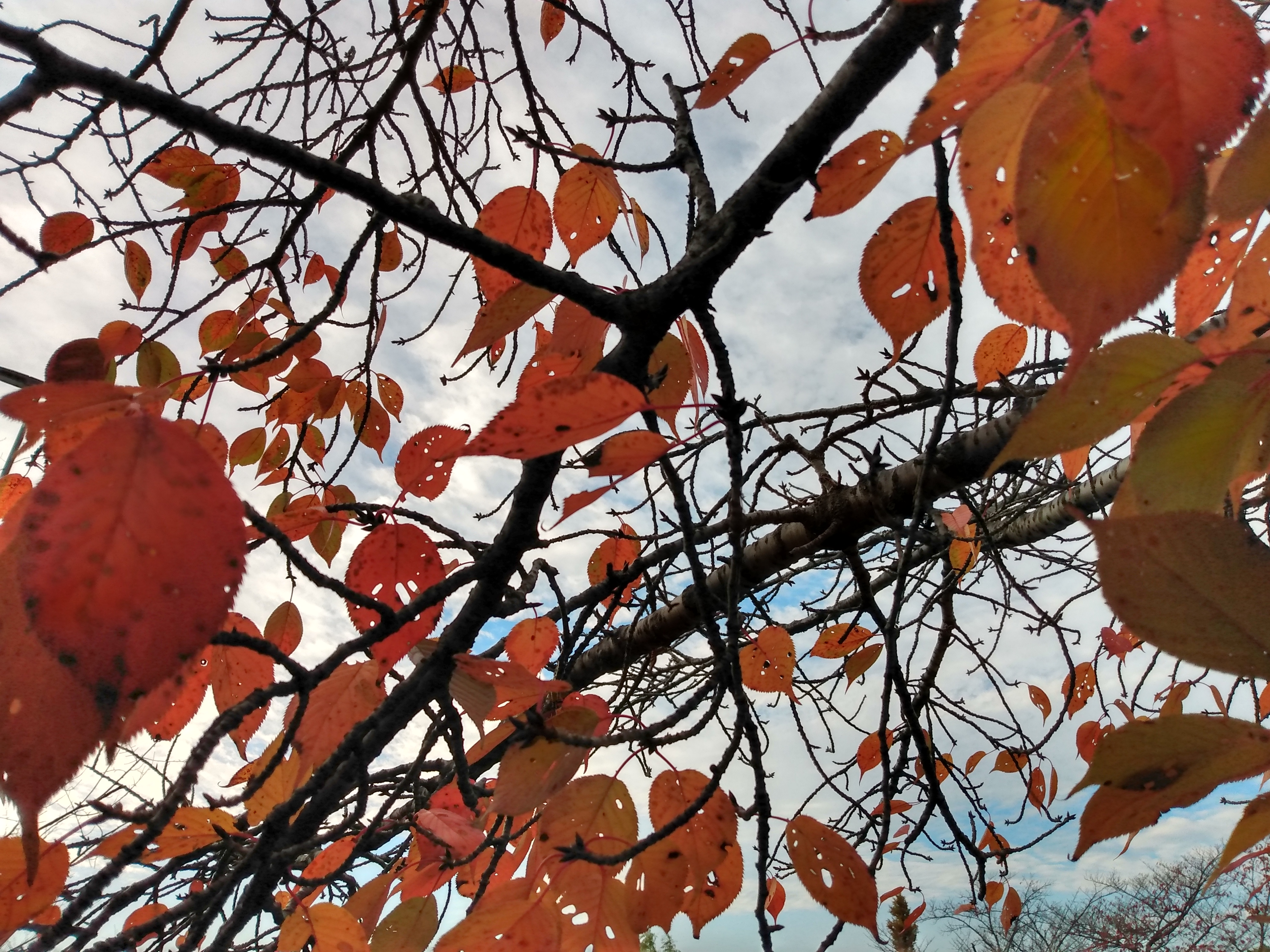
Leaves in autumn

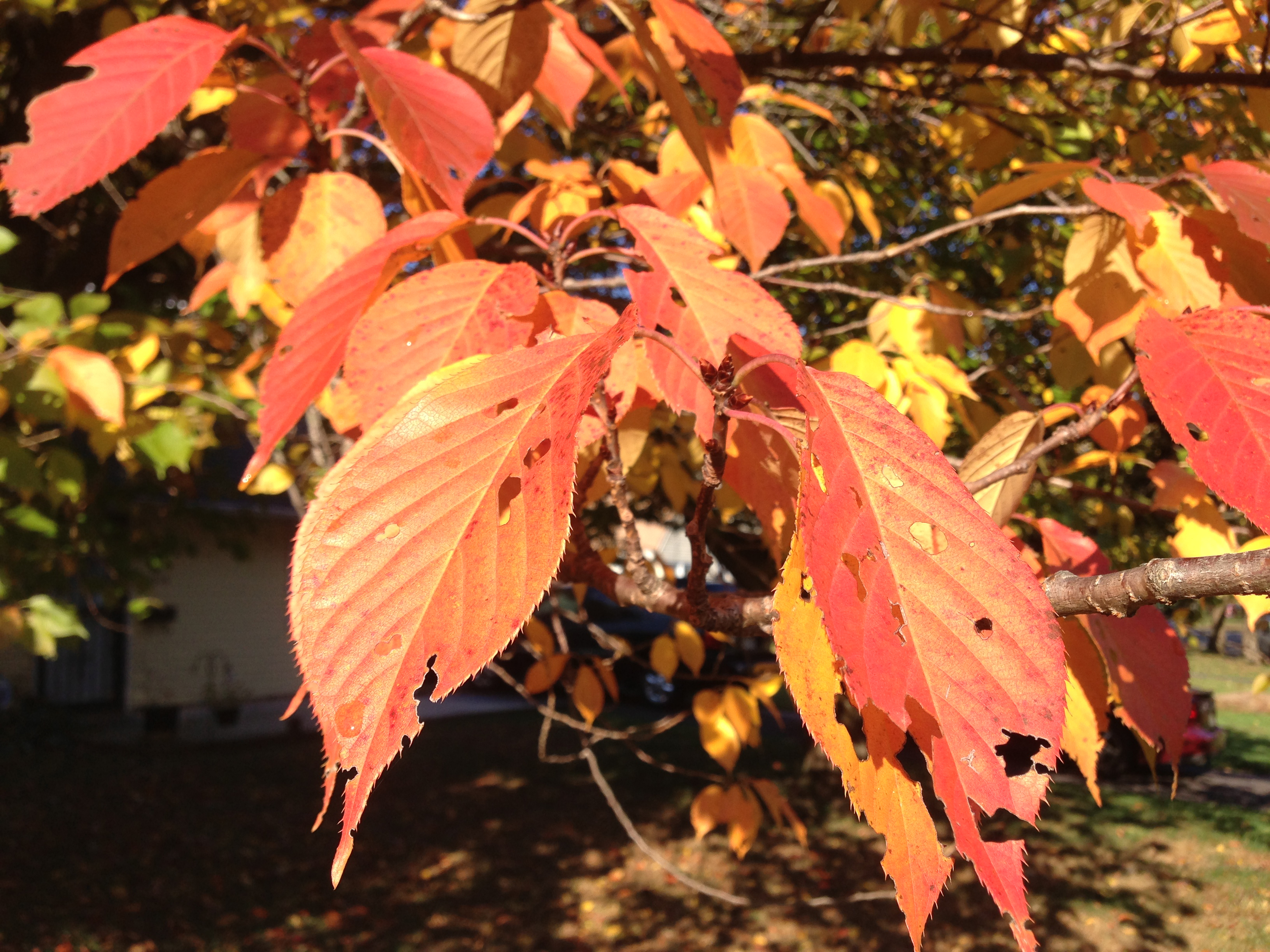
Typical autumn foliage

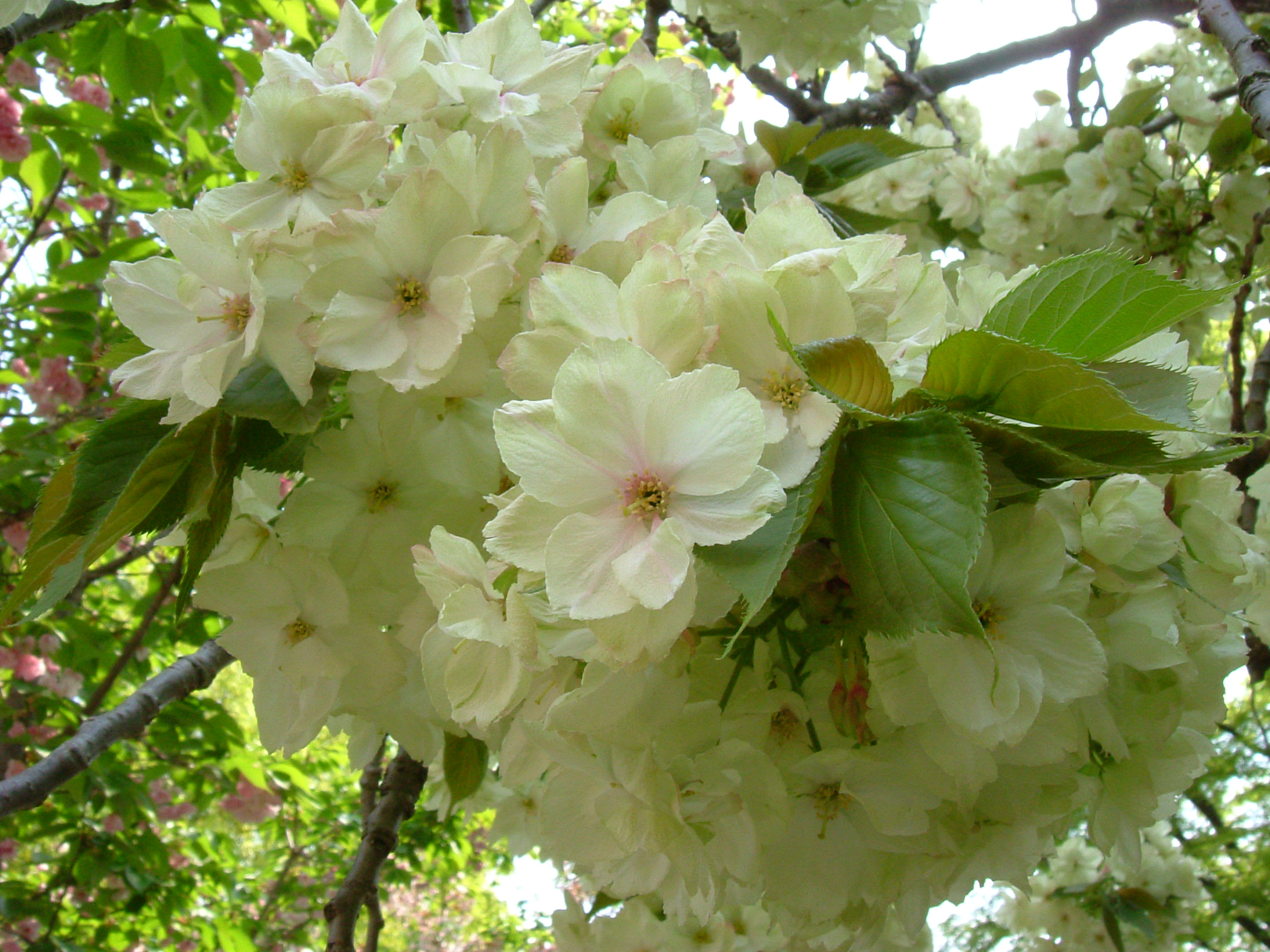
'Ukon' (Prunus lannesiana Wilson cv. 'Grandiflora')
