= Île de Versailles =

Island in Loire-Atlantique, France

Versailles Island
Native name: Île de Versailles
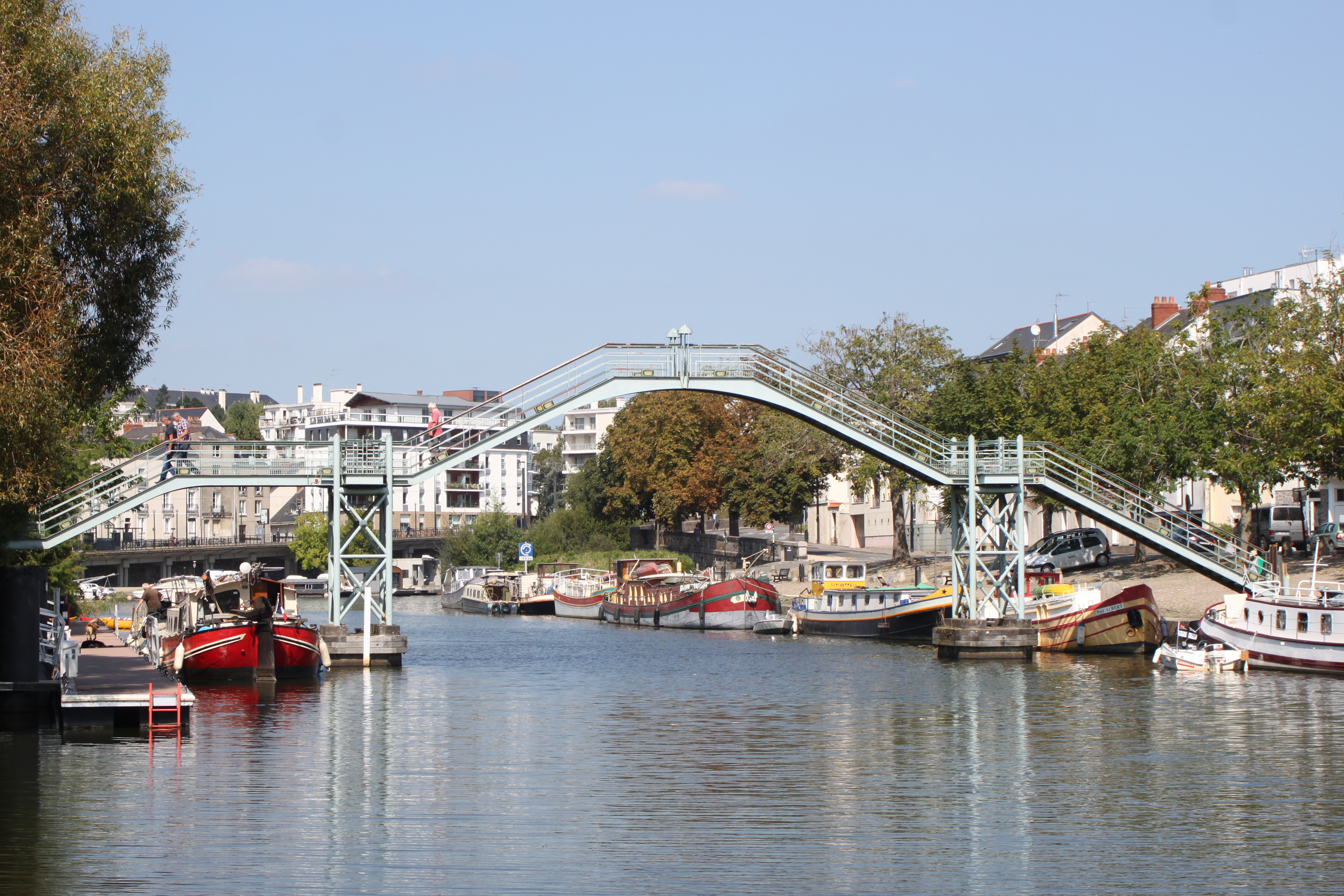
- The pedestrian bridge to the island and moored vessels
- Interactive map of Versailles Island

Geography
- Coordinates: 47°13′33″N 1°33′16″W
- Area: 1.7 ha (4.2 acres)

Administration
- France

Demographics
- Population: 0

Versailles Island or Île de Versailles is an artificial island located on the River Erdre in Nantes, which was partially created from soil excavated during earthworks and dredging for the construction of the Nantes-Brest Canal.

== Toponymy ==
This place was successively called: "Barbin Marsh" (the name of the village that was on the right bank), "Le Gall Island", then "Monkey Island", before taking its name from the Quai de Versailles, which runs along its eastern side. The name "Versailles", which was assigned in 1878, refers to a large estate called "petit Versailles" (Little Versailles), appearing on the 1756 Cacault plan, which stretched from the road to Rennes (the current Rue Paul-Bellamy) to the streets of Châteaubriant and Adolphe-Moitié.

== Geography ==
With an area of 1.7 hectares (4.2 acres), it is the furthest downstream island on the course of the Erdre, about 400 metres (1,300 ft) from quai Ceineray, where the northern entrance of the Saint-Félix tunnel opens. Located in the Hauts-Pavés - Saint-Félix district, the island is also geographically slightly closer to the right bank and the Quai de Versailles than to its left bank and the quai Henri-Barbusse.

It is accessed via a stone bridge located at the southern end, built around 1845, and two metal footbridges, one to the south-east and the other to the north-west, installed around 1988.

== History ==
The island, shown on a 1761 map, was nothing but a swamp before 1831, the year from which the rubble recovered during the digging of the Nantes-Brest Canal was transported and deposited there.

The island was bought in 1840 by Mr Le Gall, who later sold it off, divided into plots, to various future islanders. For over a century, a wide range of activities followed one another: laundries, joineries, tanneries, forges; boat building, fisheries and taverns.

In 1844, the city surveyor of Nantes, Mathurin Peccot, presented plans to transform the island into a massive wash-house, with a central basin about a hundred metres long, fed by five canals communicating with the river. However, the project never came to fruition.

At the beginning of the 20th century, the Rondet shipyard, located on the island, built the motor launch Suzette II, which is now listed as a historical boat.

Somewhat abandoned from the 1950s onwards, before its redevelopment into a park-garden, the island was only occupied by various artisanal activities related to the river, notably boat building and repairs.

In 2025, the pedestrian footbridge (built in 1987) connecting the island to the Quai de Versailles was completely renovated.

== Landmarks ==
Currently, the island features a Japanese garden, which is a popular leisure spot for the city's residents.
