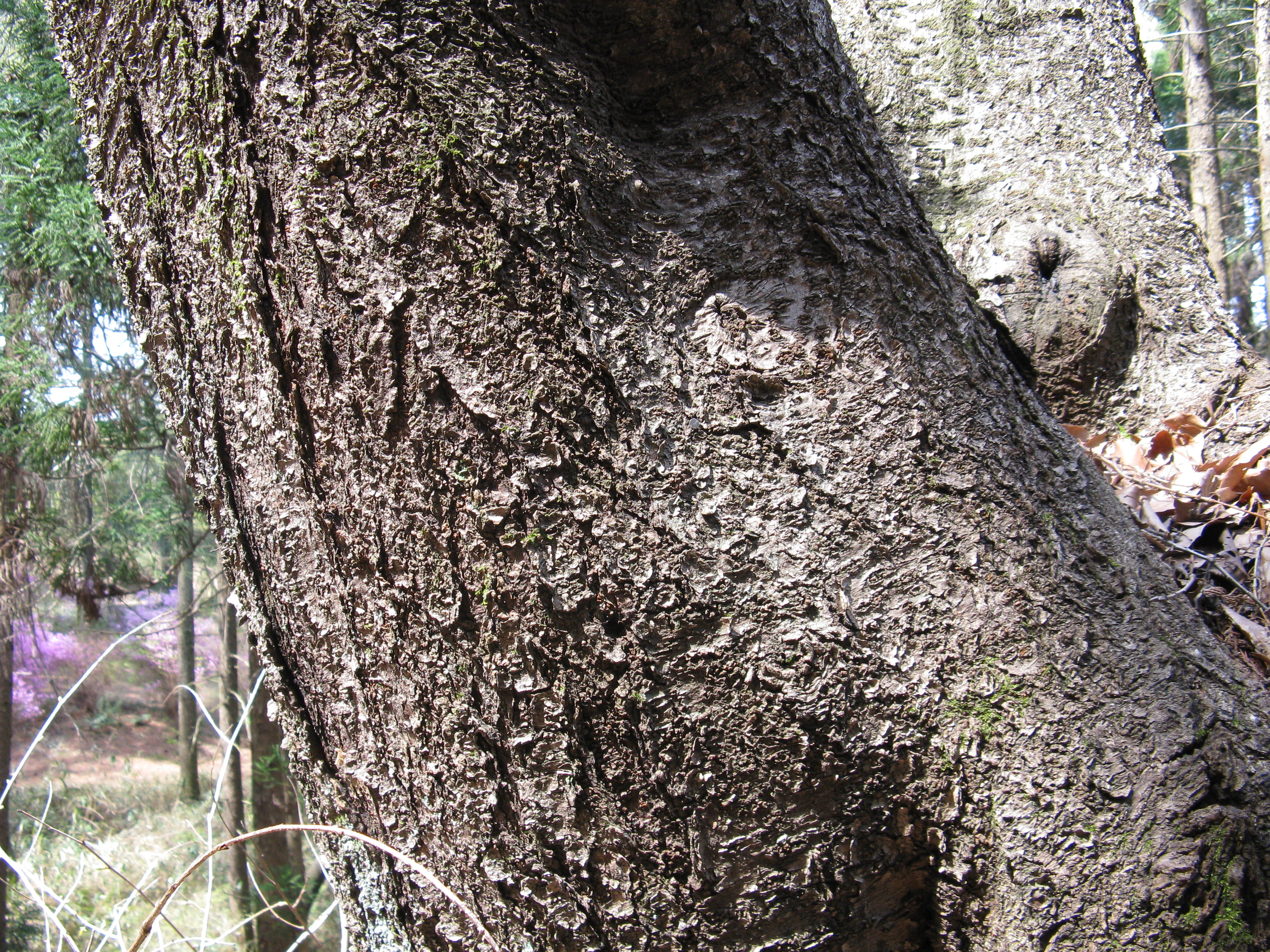
- The bark of P. leveilleana

Scientific classification
- Kingdom: Plantae
- Clade: Tracheophytes
- Clade: Angiosperms
- Clade: Eudicots
- Clade: Rosids
- Order: Rosales
- Family: Rosaceae
- Genus: Prunus
- Subgenus: Prunus subg. Cerasus
- Species: P. leveilleana

Binomial name
- Prunus leveilleana Koehne

Synonyms
- Cerasus leveilleana (Koehne) H. Ohba; Prunus jamasakura Siebold ex Koidz. var. verecunda Koidz.; Prunus sargentii Rehder var. verecunda (Koidz.) Chin S. Chang; Prunus serrulata Lindl. var. pubescens (Makino) Nakai; Prunus verecunda (Koidz.) Koehne

= Prunus leveilleana =

Species of tree

Prunus leveilleana is a native of Korea, Japan and China. It generally has autumnal leaves of reddish-brown or crimson red colour. It has flowers of bright yellow-white colors.

== Biochemistry ==
In this species various new flavonoid compounds have been found. The compounds are pinocembrin-5-glucoside (5,7-dihydroxyflavanone 5-glucoside), geinstein (5,7,4'-trihydroxysoflavone), prunetin (5,4' dihydroxy-7-methoxyflavanone) and pinocembrin (5,7-dihydroxyflavanone) were found on September 6, 1956.

== Habitat ==
This species is a native of middle Japan, where it is commonly distributed into the mountainous regions.
