= Japanese bird cherry =

Japanese bird cherry may refer to:

- Prunus grayana
- Prunus ssiori
