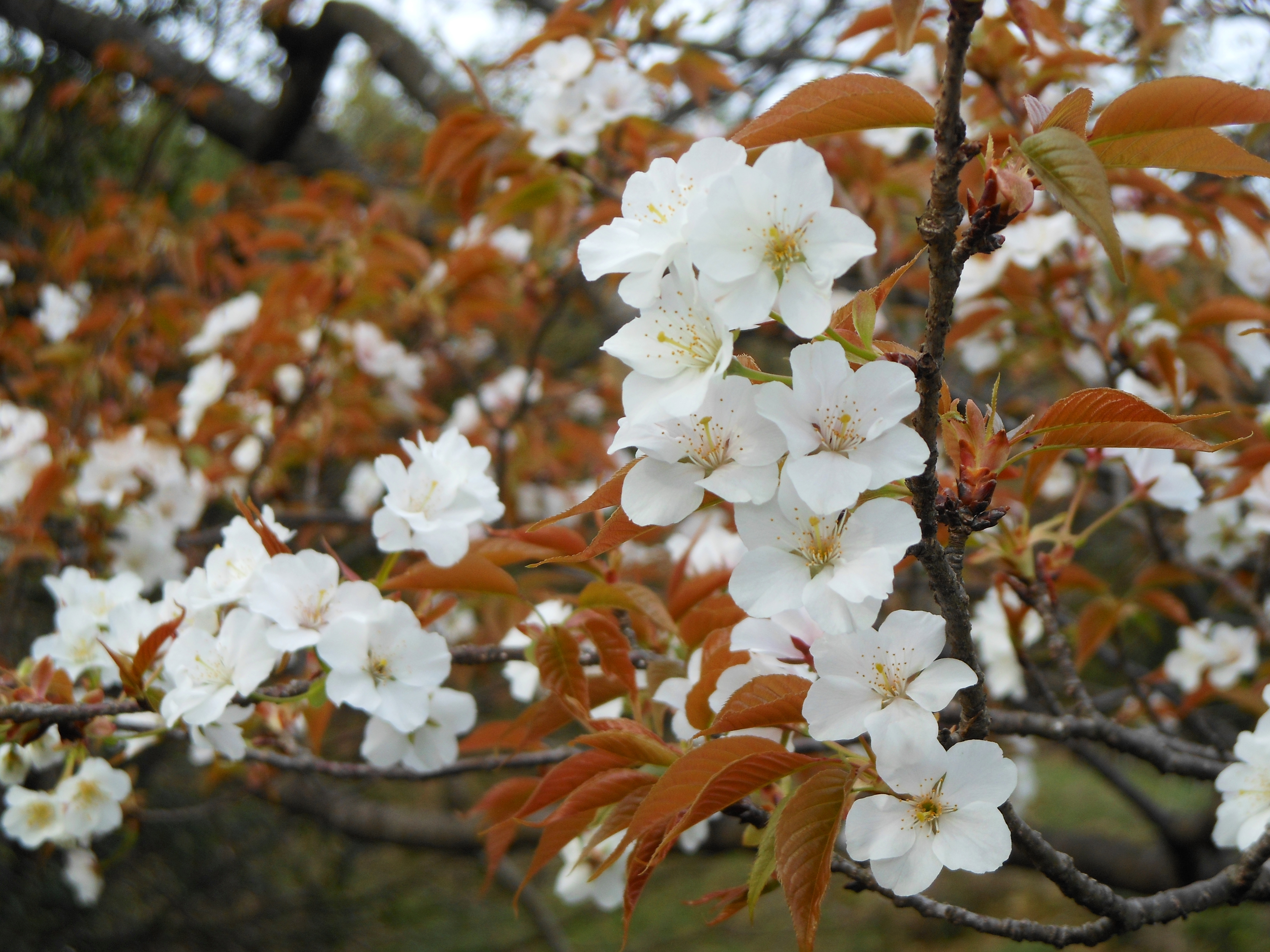

Conservation status
- Least Concern (IUCN 3.1)

Scientific classification
- Kingdom: Plantae
- Clade: Embryophytes
- Clade: Tracheophytes
- Clade: Angiosperms
- Clade: Eudicots
- Clade: Rosids
- Order: Rosales
- Family: Rosaceae
- Genus: Prunus
- Subgenus: Prunus subg. Cerasus
- Species: P. jamasakura

Binomial name
- Prunus jamasakura (Makino) Siebold ex Koidz.

Synonyms
- Homotypic Synonyms: Cerasus jamasakura (Makino) H.Ohba; Prunus pseudocerasus var. jamasakura Makino

= Prunus jamasakura =

Japanese mountain cherry

Species of flowering plant

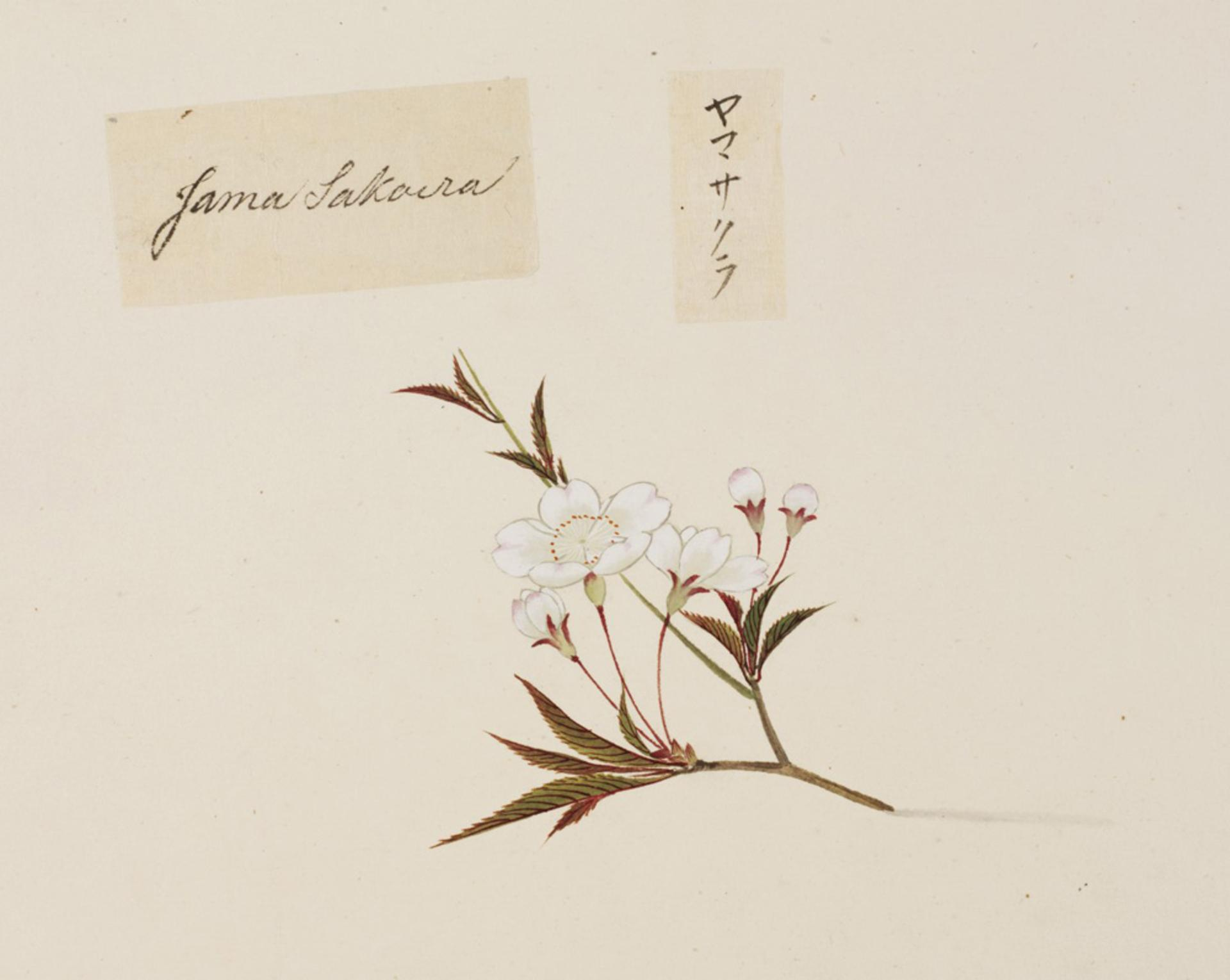
Yamazakura, by Yūshi Ishizaki, 1820s, Cock Blomhoff Collection, Naturalis Biodiversity Center

Prunus jamasakura, the Japanese mountain cherry, is a species of flowering plant in the family Rosaceae that is said to be endemic to Japan. However, it is also said to be native to Korea, and to China.

== Taxonomy ==
The species was first given a binomial by Philipp Franz von Siebold in 1830, the specific epithet relating to the Japanese common name, yama-zakura (ヤマザクラ, 山桜), lit. the "mountain" or "wild cherry". While Siebold alludes to the uses to which the tree has traditionally been put—its wood in woodblock printing, its bark in a range of crafts (kabazaiku), its fruit for consumption (Note: "Lignum exclusive in usum xylographorum versum, cortex pro diversis utensilibus ac fructus a pueris colliguntur.")—there is no description, diagnosis, or reference to previous literature containing such, no illustration, and no mention of a type specimen, his Prunus jamasakura being a nomen nudum or seminudum.

Tomitaro Makino first described the taxon in 1908, as Prunus pseudocerasus var. jamasakura. Elevated to species rank (Prunus jamasakura) by Gen-ichi Koidzumi in 1911, in 1992 Hideaki Ohba moved the mountain cherry to the genus Cerasus, a treatment still followed by a number of authorities. Ohba and Shinobu Akiyama suggest that Makino's var. jamasakura is a "superfluous name" and give the citation Cerasus jamasakura (Siebold ex Koidz.) H. Ohba.

Two varieties are recognized:

- Prunus jamasakura var. chikusiensis (Koidz.) Ohwi (type locality: Tanegashima; Tsukushi-yama-zakura (ツクシヤマザクラ))
- Prunus jamasakura var. jamasakura (autonym)

== Description ==
Prunus jamasakura is a deciduous tree that grows to a height of 20–25 metres (66–82 ft). Koidzumi's description is as follows: "a glabrous tree, more rarely pubescent. Elliptic leaves suddenly acuminate, sharply setaceo-serrated. Petioles arranged mostly towards the apex, with two glands. Coetaneous flowers very rarely subprecocious, corymbose or fascicled. Glabrous style." (Note: "Arbor glaber rarius pubescens. Folia elliptica subito acuminata, argute setaceo-serrulata. Petioli plerumque versus apicem glandulis duobus instructi. Flores coaetanei rarissime subprecociores, corymbosi vel fasciculati. Stylus glaber.") His description of the Tsukushi variety notes: "umbels with shorter peduncles, smaller bracts, and leaves' saw-teeth less aristate". (Note: "Umbellae pedunculis brevioribus, bracteis minoribus, foliorum serraturis brevius aristatis.")

A study of the impact of feeding upon the fruit by black bears noted their preference for ripe cherries (some 50–66 days after blossoming) and found no significant difference in the percentage of seeds that germinated compared with the control, suggesting their potential in dispersal.

== Distribution ==
The endemic species occurs in the low mountains and secondary forests of Japan, from the Kantō region of Honshū to Shikoku and Kyūshū. The Tsukushi variety is found on the islands surrounding Kyūshū, including Tsushima, Tanegashima, and the Tokara Islands.

== Conservation status ==
Prunus jamasakura is classed as Least Concern on the IUCN Red List, although the 2021 assessment notes a decline in the area and quality of its habitat.

== Cultural significance ==
The mountain cherry, even if its historic circumscription hasn't always conformed with current taxonomic understanding and molecular phylogenetics, has inspired Japanese poets since the days of the Man'yōshū and long been the object of the practices of appreciation known as hanami. Records of its full blossoming and of viewing parties in Edo period diaries and chronicles are such that they have been drawn on more recently for the reconstruction of historic temperatures.

== Uses ==
In South Korea this cherry is used an ornamental, and the wood is used for building materials, furniture, musical instruments, and carving. The fruit is edible and the bark is used medicinally.

== See also ==
- Cherry blossom front
- Prunus × yedoensis
