= Cherry blossom front =

Local advance of cherry tree blossomings

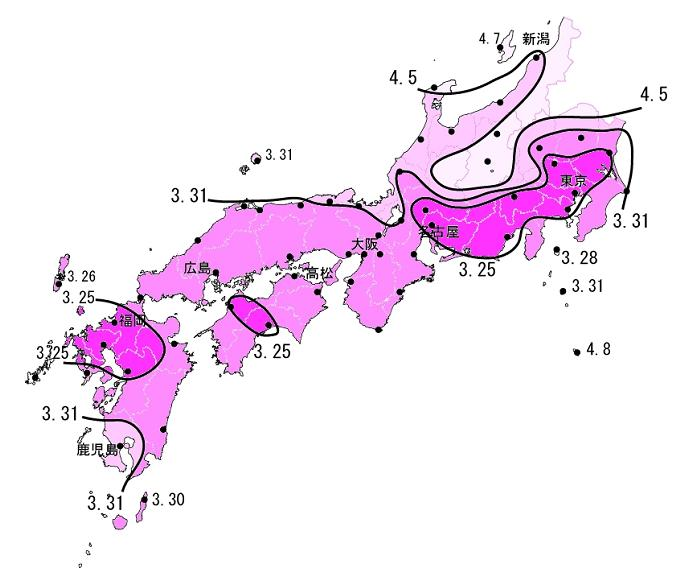
The cherry blossom front between Kyushu and Kanto, 2007

The cherry blossom front (桜前線, sakura zensen) is the advance of the cherry blossoms across Japan. The Japan Meteorological Agency records the opening and full bloom of the blossoms from Kyūshū in late March to Hokkaidō in the middle of May. The advancing front is also the subject of regular reports by the major news agencies. The cherry blossom is of great public interest in Japan due to its symbolism and the custom of flower viewing known as hanami.

== Forecasts ==
From 1951 the Japan Meteorological Agency produced forecasts for the Kantō region and from 1955 for the whole of Japan excepting Okinawa and the Amami Islands. From 2010, the Agency left forecasting to the private sector although it continues to observe and determine the impact of the climate upon the flowering of the cherry. The forecast is based on the Arrhenius equation, with the formula
$$\text{DTS} = \exp\left[9.5 \times 10^3 \cdot \frac{T - 288.2}{288.2\,T}\right],$$
where T is the mean day temperature in kelvins, and DTS represents the number of days transformed to standard temperature.

== Blossoming ==
The day of opening (Note: Japanese terms: day of opening (開花日, kaikabi); day of full bloom (満開日, mankaibi); sample tree (標本木, hyōhonboku); cherry blossom forecast (さくらの開花予想, sakura no kaikayosō)) is defined as the point at which at least five to six flowers have opened on the sample tree. The day of full bloom is when at least 80% of the flowers have opened. The Yoshino cherry is typically observed since, from the late Edo period, it has been planted across the archipelago. Sample trees also include the Higan cherry in the south and Prunus sargentii (Sargent's cherry) in the north.

In 2006 it was reported that the cherry blossoms might overtake the plum blossoms before reaching Hokkaidō.

== Sample trees ==
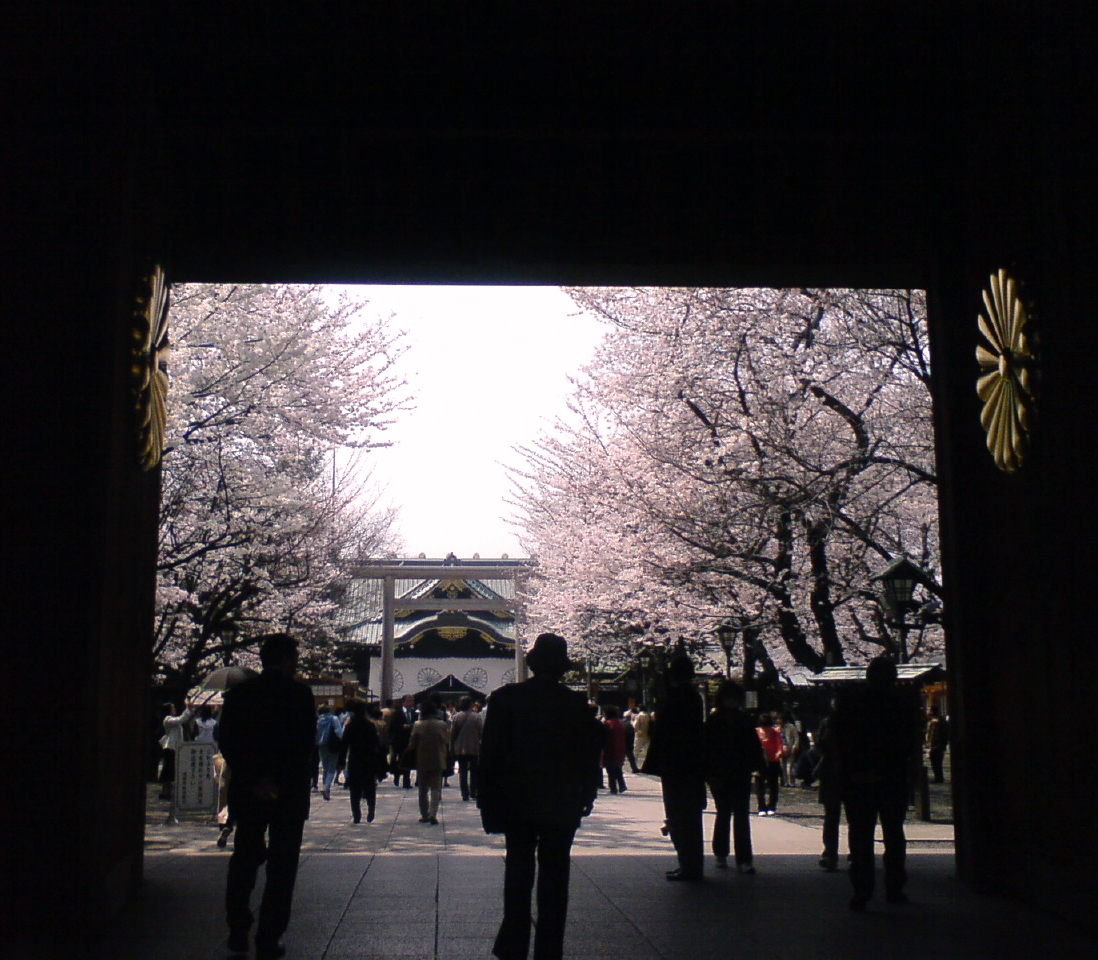
In Tokyo the sample tree specified by the Meteorological Agency is within the precincts of Yasukuni Jinja

There are fifty-nine sample trees at any one time. Successor junior trees are selected from among prospective candidates when an incumbent becomes too old or is otherwise incapacitated. For instance, the sample tree in Mito collapsed under the weight of snow in 2005, while that at the southern tip of Ishigaki Island was felled by a typhoon a year later. The fifty-nine sample trees are located across Japan, corresponding to the sites of the Agency's principal weather stations:

- Okinawa: Ishigaki, Miyako-jima, Naha, Minamidaitō
- Kyūshū/Yamaguchi: Fukuoka, Shimonoseki, Ōita, Nagasaki, Saga, Kumamoto, Miyazaki, Kagoshima, Amami (formerly Naze)
- Shikoku: Takamatsu, Tokushima, Matsuyama, Kōchi
- Chūgoku: Hiroshima, Okayama, Matsue, Tottori
- Kinki: Ōsaka, Hikone, Kyōto, Maizuru, Kobe, Nara, Wakayama
- Tōkai: Nagoya, Shizuoka, Gifu, Tsu
- Kantō: Tōkyō, Mito, Utsunomiya, Maebashi, Kumagaya, Chōshi, Yokohama, Nagano, Kōfu
- Hokuriku: Niigata, Toyama, Kanazawa, Fukui
- Tōhoku: Sendai, Aomori, Akita, Morioka, Yamagata, Fukushima
- Hokkaidō: Sapporo, Wakkanai, Asahikawa, Abashiri, Obihiro, Kushiro, Muroran, Hakodate.

== See also ==
- Leaf peeping
- Phenology
- Ueno Park
