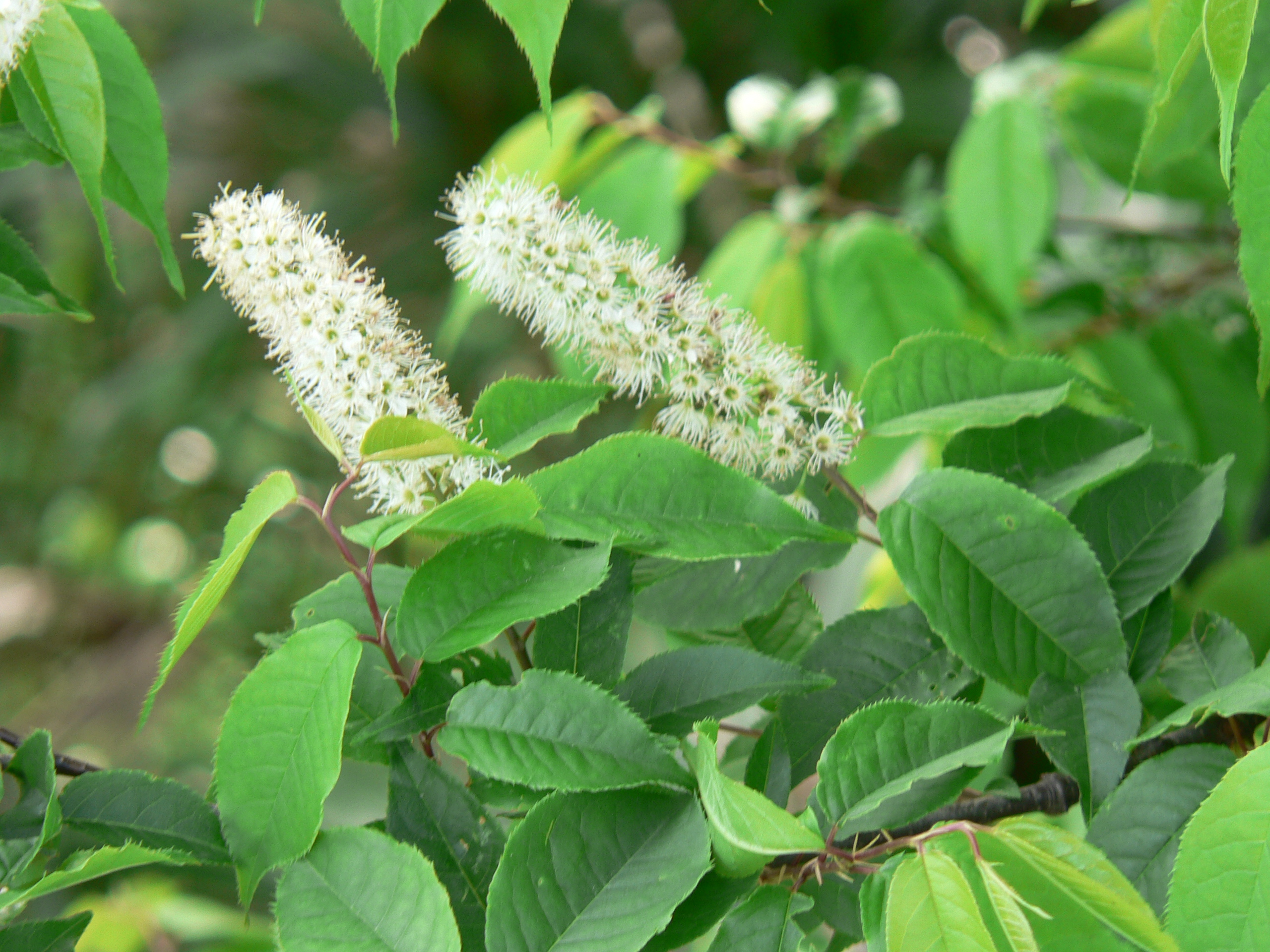

Scientific classification
- Kingdom: Plantae
- Clade: Embryophytes
- Clade: Tracheophytes
- Clade: Angiosperms
- Clade: Eudicots
- Clade: Rosids
- Order: Rosales
- Family: Rosaceae
- Genus: Prunus
- Subgenus: Prunus subg. Padus
- Species: P. grayana

Binomial name
- Prunus grayana Maxim.

Synonyms
- Padus acrophylla C.K.Schneid.; Padus grayana (Maxim.) C.K.Schneid.

= Prunus grayana =

Species of tree

Prunus grayana (syn. Padus grayana (Maxim.) C.K.Schneid., Prunus padus var. japonica Miq.; Japanese bird cherry or Gray's bird cherry; Japanese ウワミズザクラ Uwa-mizu-zakura; Chinese 灰叶稠李 hui ye chou li) is a species of bird cherry native to Japan and China, occurring at medium altitudes of 1,000–3,800 m in the temperate zone. It prefers sunshine and moist (but drained) soil.

It is a small deciduous tree reaching a height of 8–20 m. The trunk is slender with smooth grey to purple-grey bark marked with horizontal brown lenticels, with a strong smell when cut. The leaves are elliptical to ovoid, 4–10 cm long and 1.8–4.5 cm broad, with a serrated margin with aristate tips to the serrations. The lowest teeth of a leaf feature two glands. The flowers are produced on 5–8 cm long racemes, each flower 7–10 mm diameter, with five white petals; they are hermaphroditic, and appear in mid-spring after the leaves. The fruit is a small drupe, about 8 mm in diameter, green at first, then red and finally ripening black in mid summer.

It is very closely related to Prunus padus (Bird cherry), differing in the aristate tips to the leaf serration (blunt-pointed in P. padus), and the longer style in the flower.

== Uses ==
The flowers, fruit and seed are all edible and are prepared and eaten in Japan. The fruit can be preserved with salt to make a dish called Anningo. The bark and roots are the source of a green dye. The wood is very hard and splits easily. It is used in various cabinet-making and various other ornamental applications.

== Classification ==
The taxon was described in 1864 by Miquel as Prunus padus var. japonica, on the basis of specimens collected by Siebold. After a review of the previous literature, Maximowicz in St. Petersburg decided in 1883 the tree was a distinct species, and named it Prunus grayana after Asa Gray.
