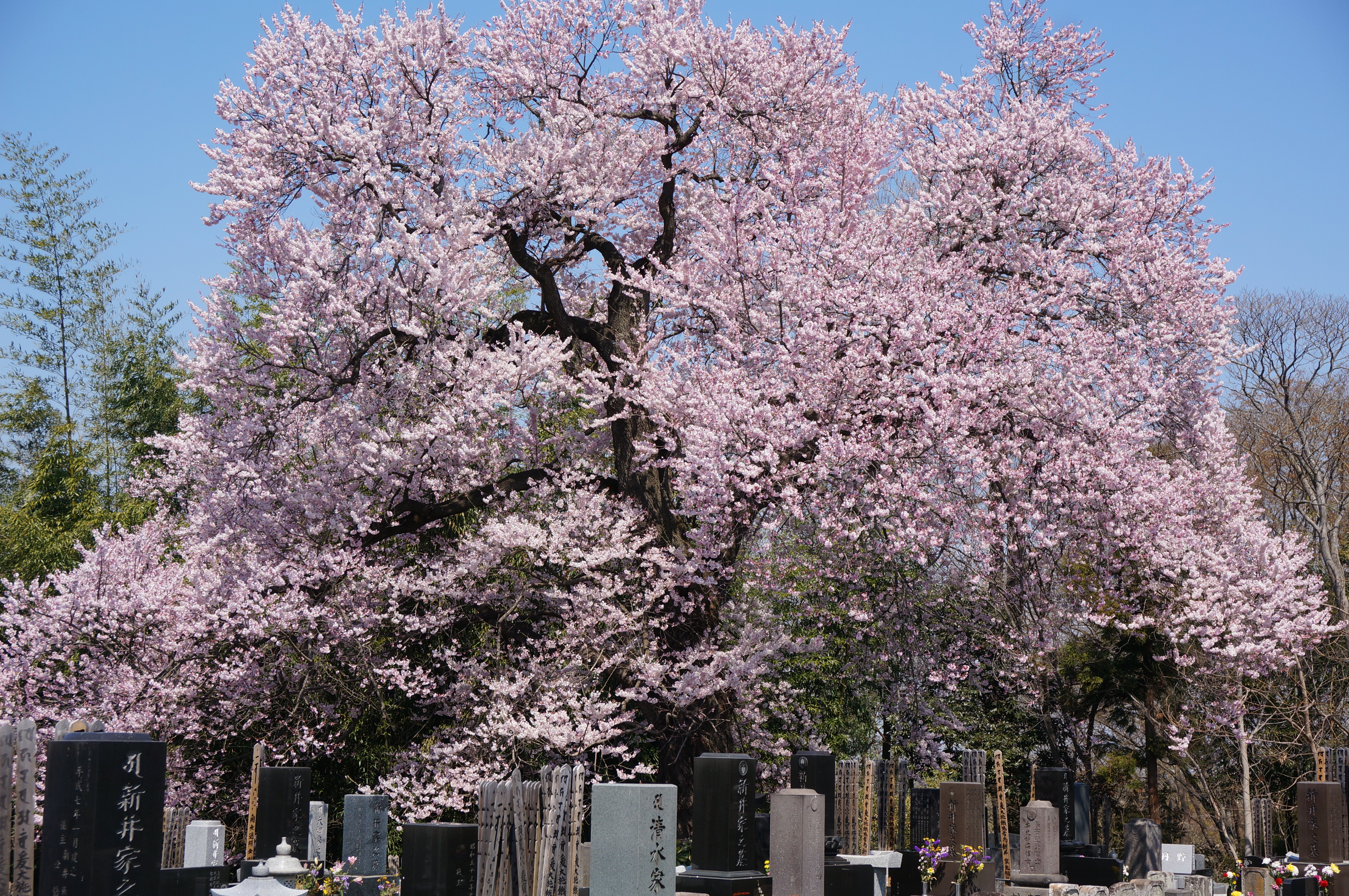
- A 200 year-old Edo higan tree. (Kitamoto City, Japan)

Scientific classification
- Kingdom: Plantae
- Clade: Tracheophytes
- Clade: Angiosperms
- Clade: Eudicots
- Clade: Rosids
- Order: Rosales
- Family: Rosaceae
- Genus: Prunus
- Subgenus: Prunus subg. Cerasus
- Species: P. itosakura

Binomial name
- Prunus itosakura Siebold

Synonyms
- Cerasus herincquiana Lavallée; Cerasus itosakura (Siebold) Masam. & S.Suzuki; Cerasus microlepis (Koehne) Kovalev & Kostina; Cerasus pendula (Desf.) Sweet; Cerasus spachiana Lavallée ex Ed.Otto; Cerasus taiwaniana (Hayata) Masam. & S.Suzuki; Prunus aequinoctialis Miyoshi; Prunus microlepis Koehne; Prunus miqueliana Maxim.; Prunus pendula Siebold ex Maxim.; Prunus pendula Desf.; Prunus pendula var. ascendens Makino; Prunus spachiana (Lavallée ex Ed.Otto) Kitam.; Prunus × subhirtella var. pendula Y. Tanaka (Note: Hybrid between this species and Prunus incisa.); Prunus taiwaniana Hayata. (Note: In the classification of Japan and Taiwan, it is an independent species.)

= Prunus itosakura =

Species of tree

Prunus itosakura is a wild species of cherry trees native to Japan, and is also the name given to the cultivars derived from this species. Itosakura (Itozakura, 糸桜) means thread cherry, and appeared in historical documents from the Heian period in Japan. The scientific name for the hybrid between this species and Prunus incisa is Prunus × subhirtella. Historically, the Japanese have produced many cultivars from this wild species, and they are also called weeping cherry, autumn cherry, ariana cherry, or winter-flowering cherry, because of the characteristics of each cultivar.

Since 2018, the United States Department of Agriculture has classified the species as Prunus itosakura not Prunus subhirtella. The name itosakura originally refers to the weeping cherry, a cultivar derived from Edo higan. However, weeping cherry trees were misunderstood as wild species in the past and were given scientific names before Edo higan. Itosakura, the scientific name for weeping cherry, has also been applied to the scientific name of Edo higan, the type species of this species, because the scientific name given earlier has priority.

== Wild species ==
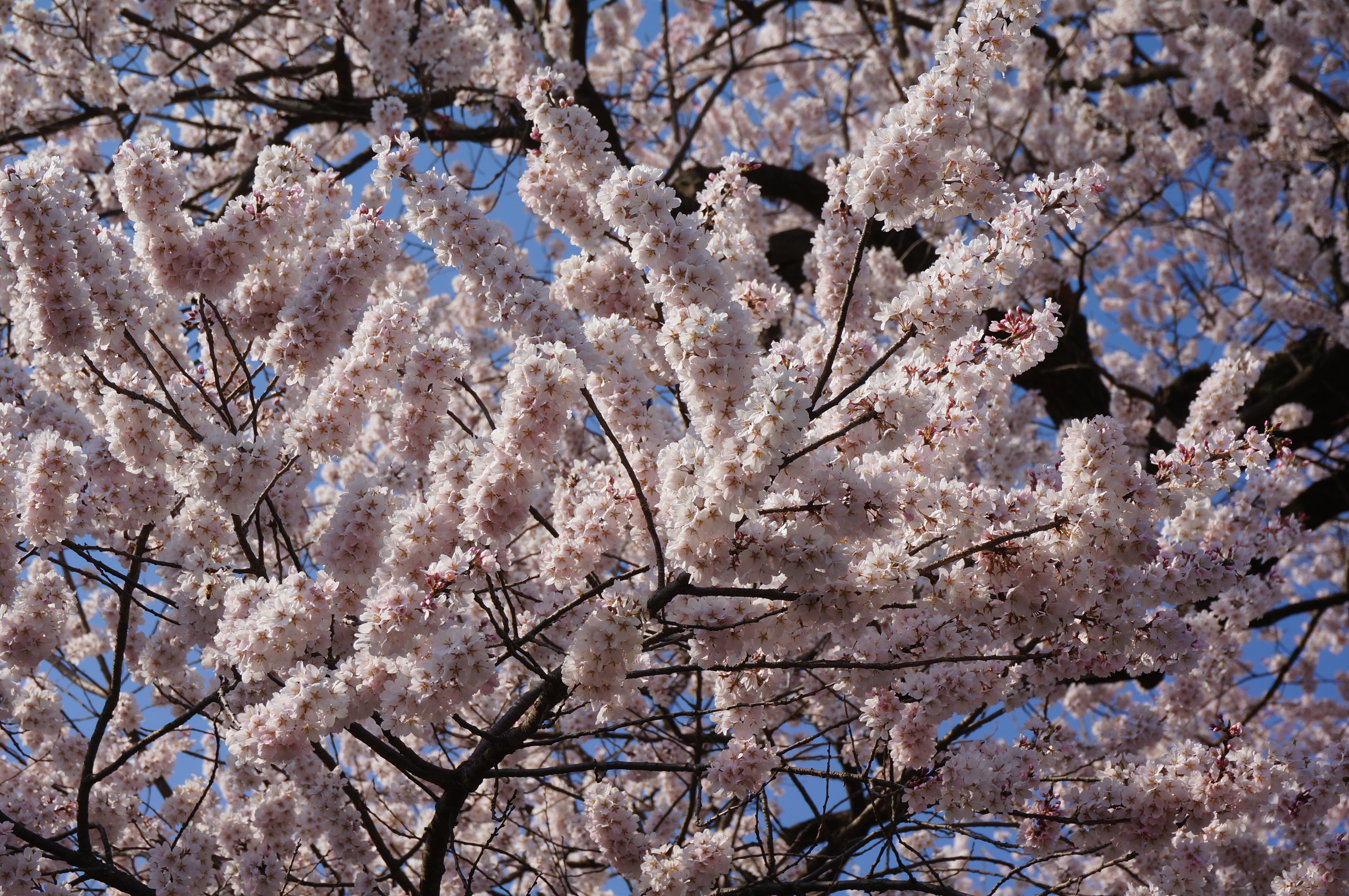

The maximum height of the tree is over 30 m (98.43 ft). It has five petals and is white or pale pink with many small flowers. Its leaves are oval and 5–10 cm (1.97-3.94 in) long. It has many hairs on the stem of flowers and leaves, which is the origin of its Latin scientific name. It flowers earlier than Yoshino cherry. Its characteristic is that it looks gorgeous because a large number of small flowers bloom before the leaves unfold, and the characteristic that this large number of flowers bloom before the leaves unfold has been inherited by the cultivars Yoshino cherry and weeping cherry.

Although it grows slowly, it has a firm trunk, is resistant to snow damage and wind damage and does not rot easily, so it has the longest life among cherry trees and is easy to grow into a big tree. For this reason, there are many large and long-lived trees of this species in Japan, and their cherry trees are often regarded as sacred and have become a landmark that symbolizes Shinto shrines, Buddhist temples and local areas. For example, Jindai-zakura that is around 2,000 years old, Usuzumi-zakura that is around 1,500 years old, and Daigo-zakura that is around 1,000 years old are famous. In exchange for longevity, Edo higan takes a long time to blossom after germination, and it blooms only when it grows to about 10 meters (32.8 ft) tall. In some cases, it may take several decades from germination to flowering.

There are synonyms for various scientific names, including Prunus subhirtella var. ascendens, Prunus pendula f. ascendens, Cerasus itosakura (Siebold) Masam. et Suzuki, and Cerasus spachiana Lavallée ex Ed. Otto.

A 2,000 year-old Jindai-zakura

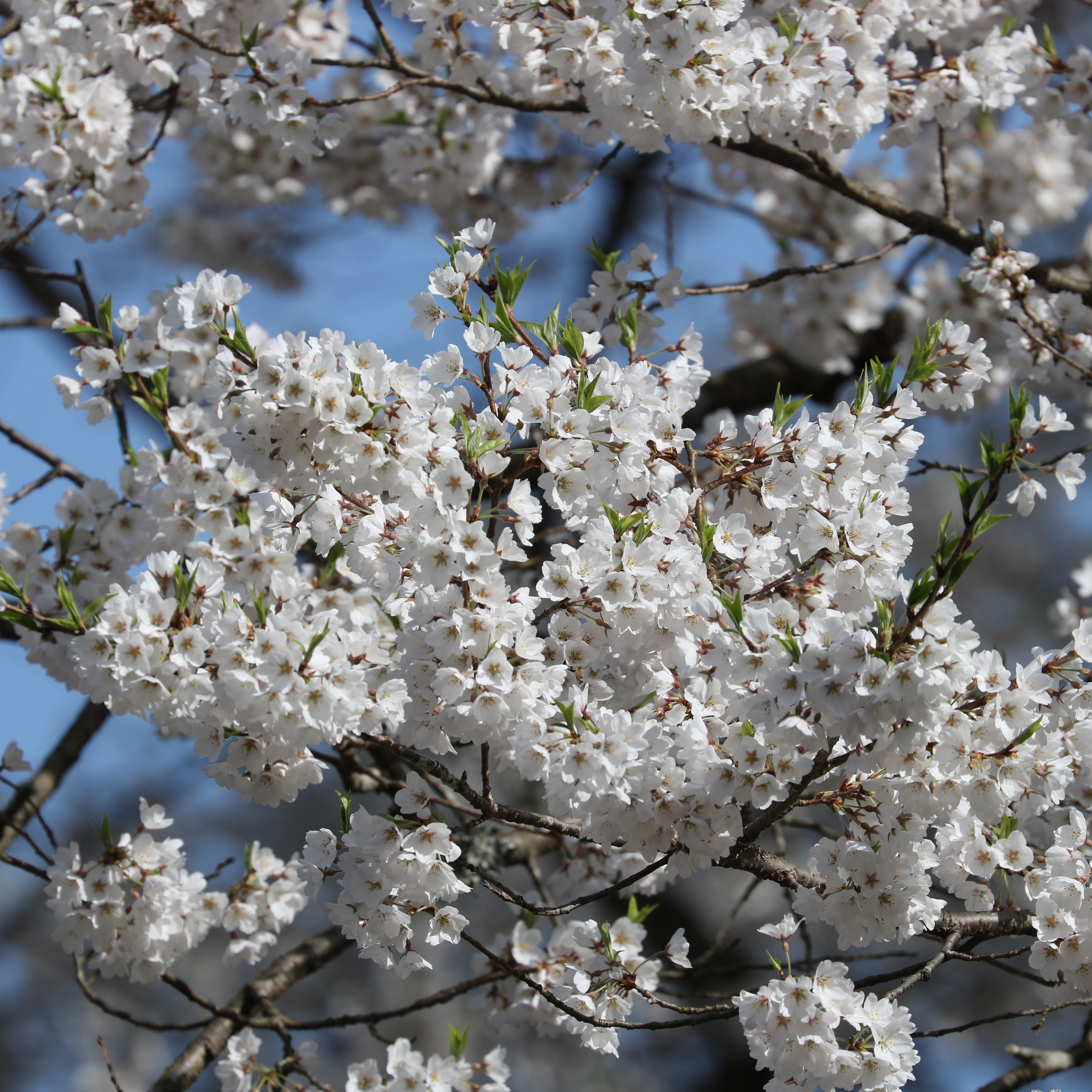
A 1,500 year-old Usuzumi-zakura

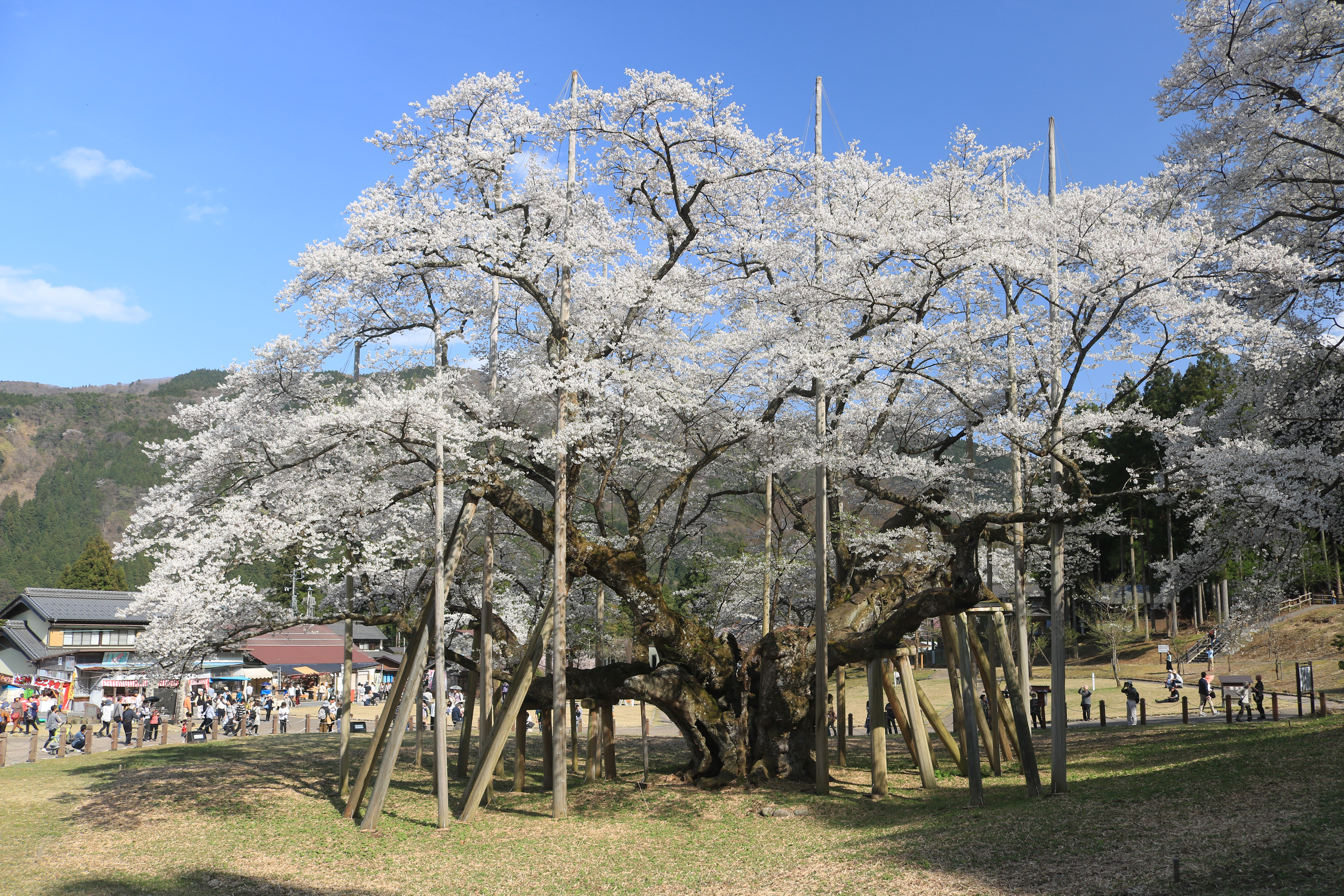
A 1,500 year-old Usuzumi-zakura

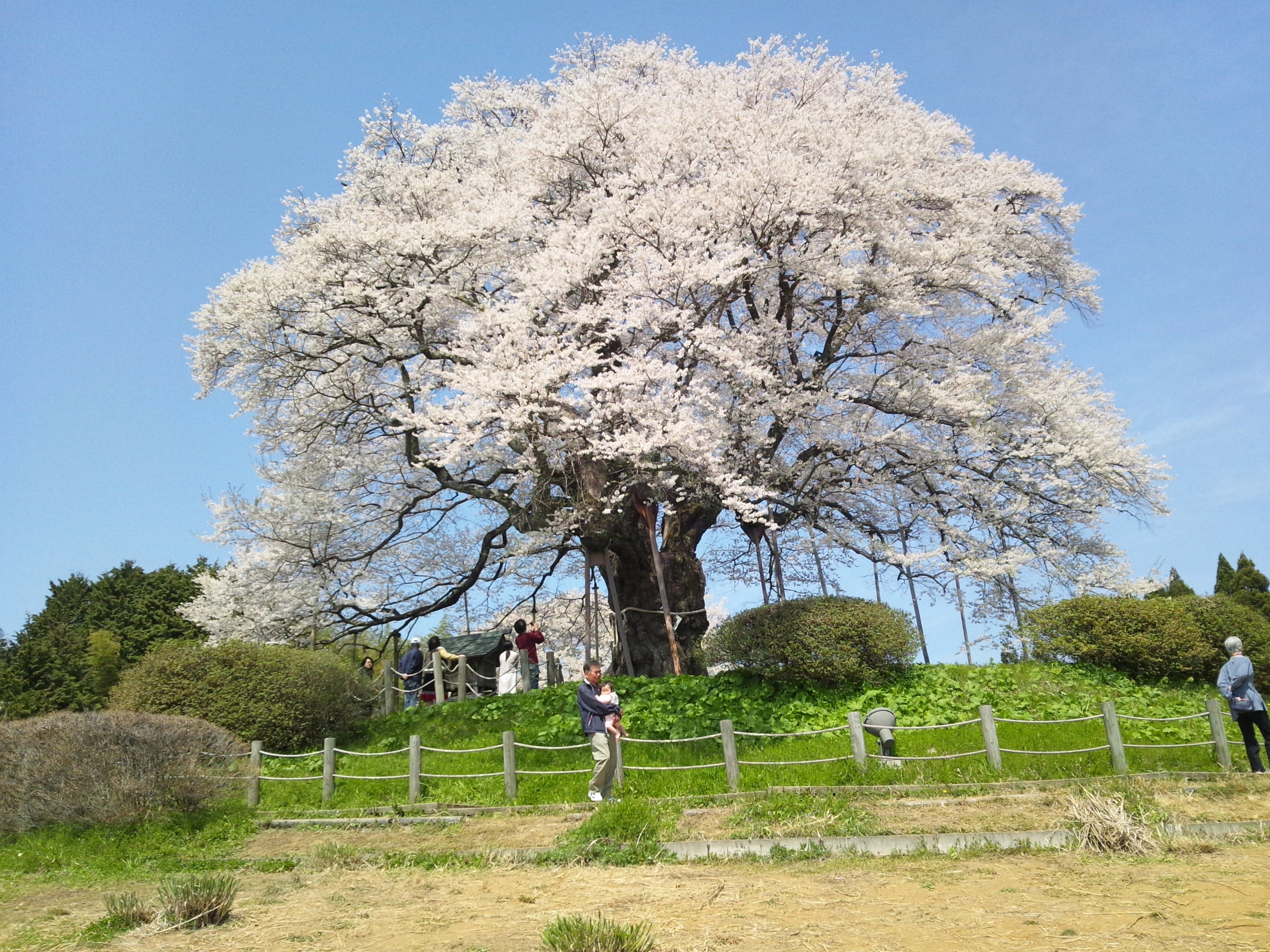
A 1,000 year-old Daigo-zakura

== Cultivars ==
An unprecedented and detailed DNA study conducted by the Forestry and Forest Products Research Institute in 2014 proved that many cultivars with pendulous branches, such as 'Shidare-zakura' (weeping cherry), and cultivars such as Yoshino cherry, 'Kohigan' and 'Jugatsu-zakura', were derived from Edo higan.

According to historical documents, 1,000 years ago, during the Heian period, the Japanese created a cultivar, 'Shidare-zakura', based on this species, which is the oldest cultivar among the confirmed cherry cultivars. In the Edo period, the most popular cultivar in the world, Yoshino cherry, was produced by crossing this species with Oshima cherry.

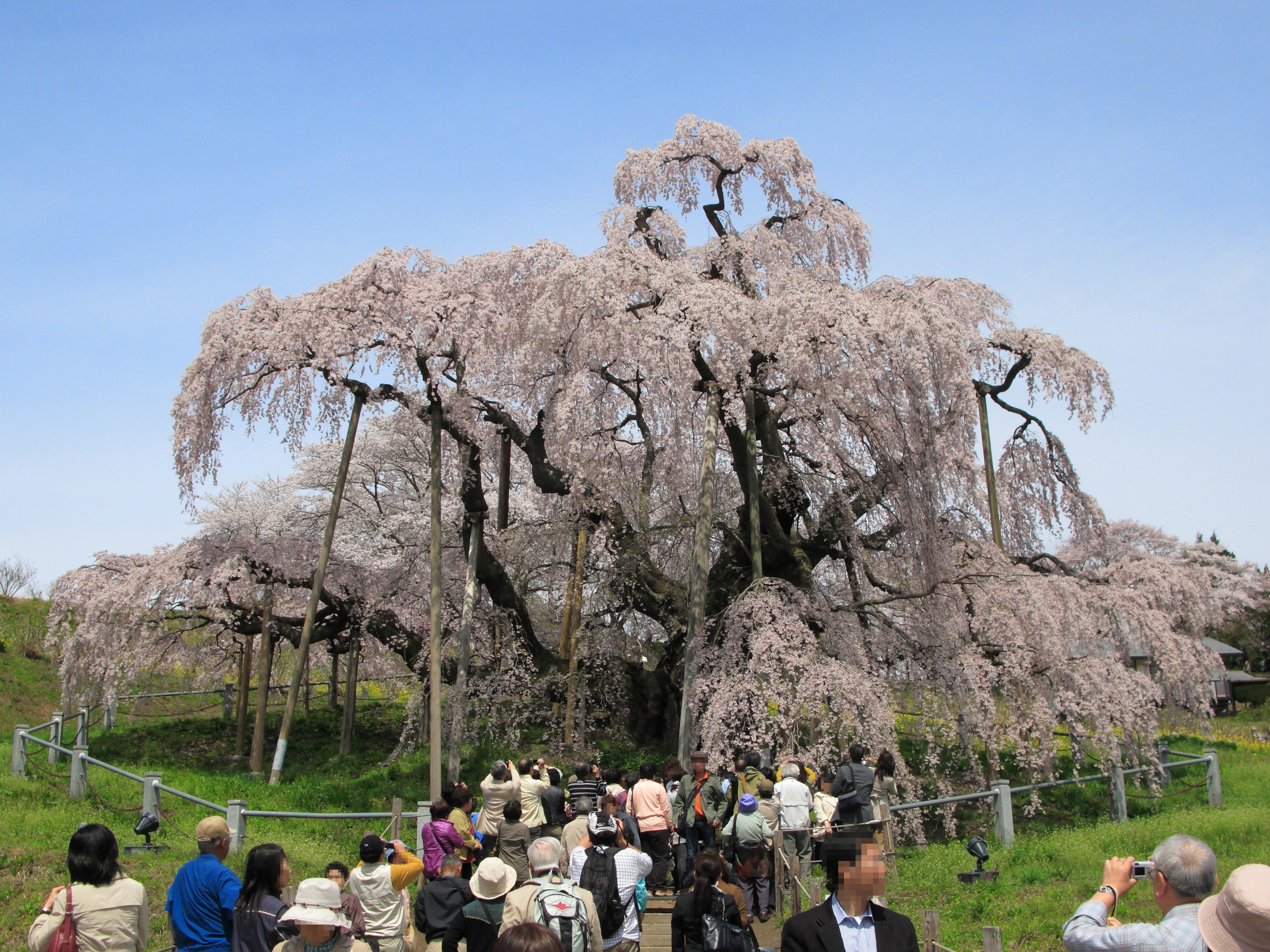
A 1,000 year-old Miharu Takizakura. (Prunus itosakura 'Pendula-rosea' aka 'Beni-shidare')

The weeping cherry, which was born as a mutation in Edo higan, inherits the longevity characteristics of Edo higan. For this reason, Shinto shrines, Buddhist temples and rural areas throughout Japan have many long-standing weeping cherry trees, among which the Miharu Takizakura, 1,000 years old, is famous. Many cultivars of weeping cherry inherit the characteristic of Edo higan that flowers bloom before the leaves unfold.

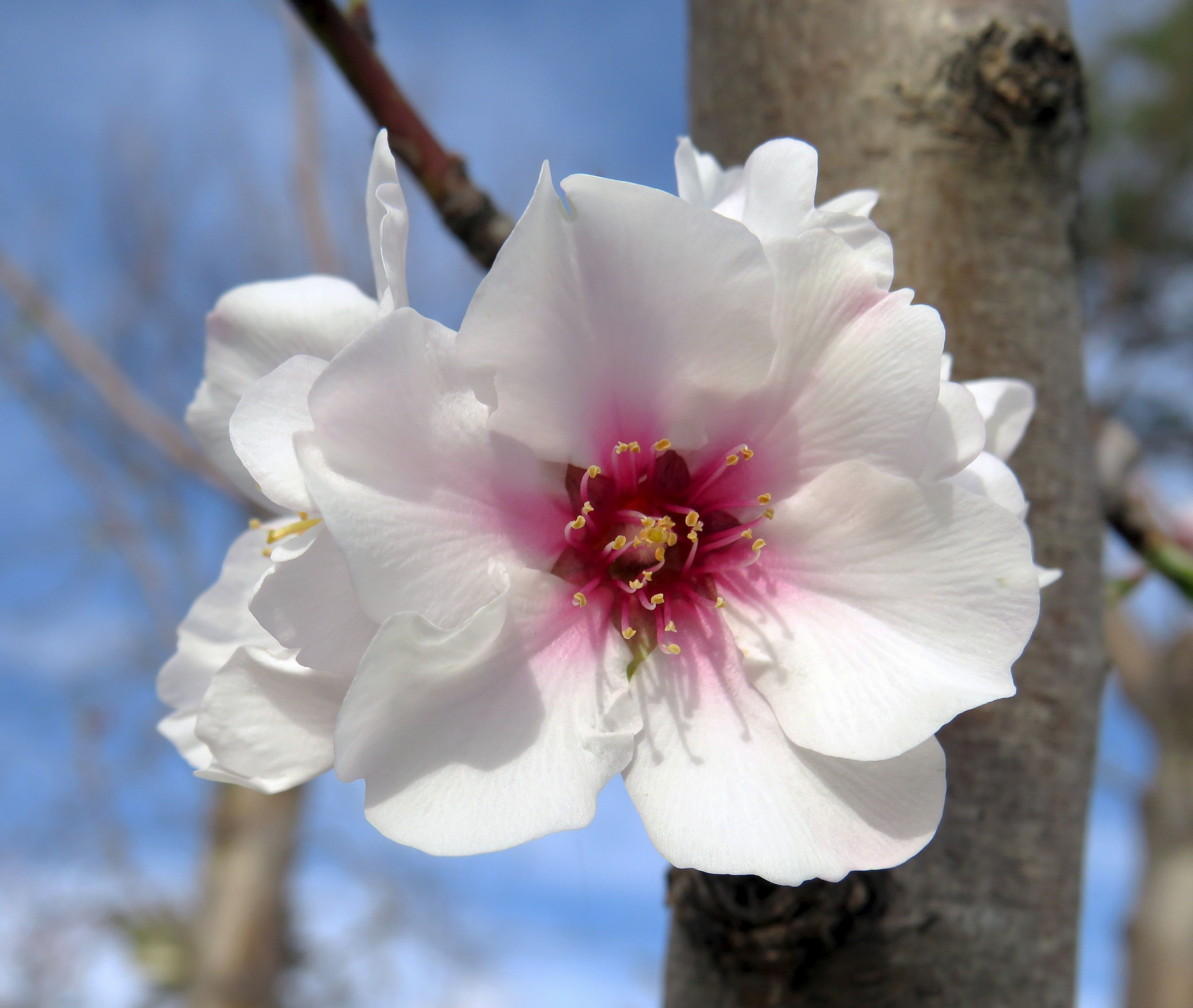
P. × subhirtella 'Autumnalis Rosea'

The interspecific hybrid between this species and Prunus incisa is designated P. × subhirtella. Cultivars from these hybrids are much smaller than wild species, about 5 meters (16.5 ft) tall, and are suitable for planting in gardens because they bloom from a young age. P. × subhirtella 'Jugatsu-zakura' (incorrectly known as P. × subhirtella 'Autumnalis') is widely grown for its propensity to flower during mild winter weather. P. × subhirtella 'Autumnalis Rosea' is widely grown in gardens, and has gained the Royal Horticultural Society's Award of Garden Merit. P. × subhirtella 'Omoigawa' was born from 'Jugatsu-zakura' seeds in Oyama City in 1954, and is considered to be a hybrid between 'Jugatsu-zakura' and Yoshino cherry because it inherited the genes of this species, P. incisa and P. speciosa (Oshima cherry). 'Omoigawa' blooms only in spring. P. × subhirtella 'Ujou-shidare' originated from cherry blossoms at the residence of the poet, Ujō Noguchi, located in Utsunomiya City, and is characterized by drooping branches.

On the other hand, the interspecific hybrid between this species and Prunus speciosa (Oshima cherry) is designated P. × yedoensis, and Yoshino cherry is applicable. Yoshino cherry inherits the characteristic of Edo higan that flowers bloom before the leaves unfold and that it becomes a big tree. On the other hand, it does not inherit the characteristic of slow growth and is the fastest growing cultivar of cherry blossoms.

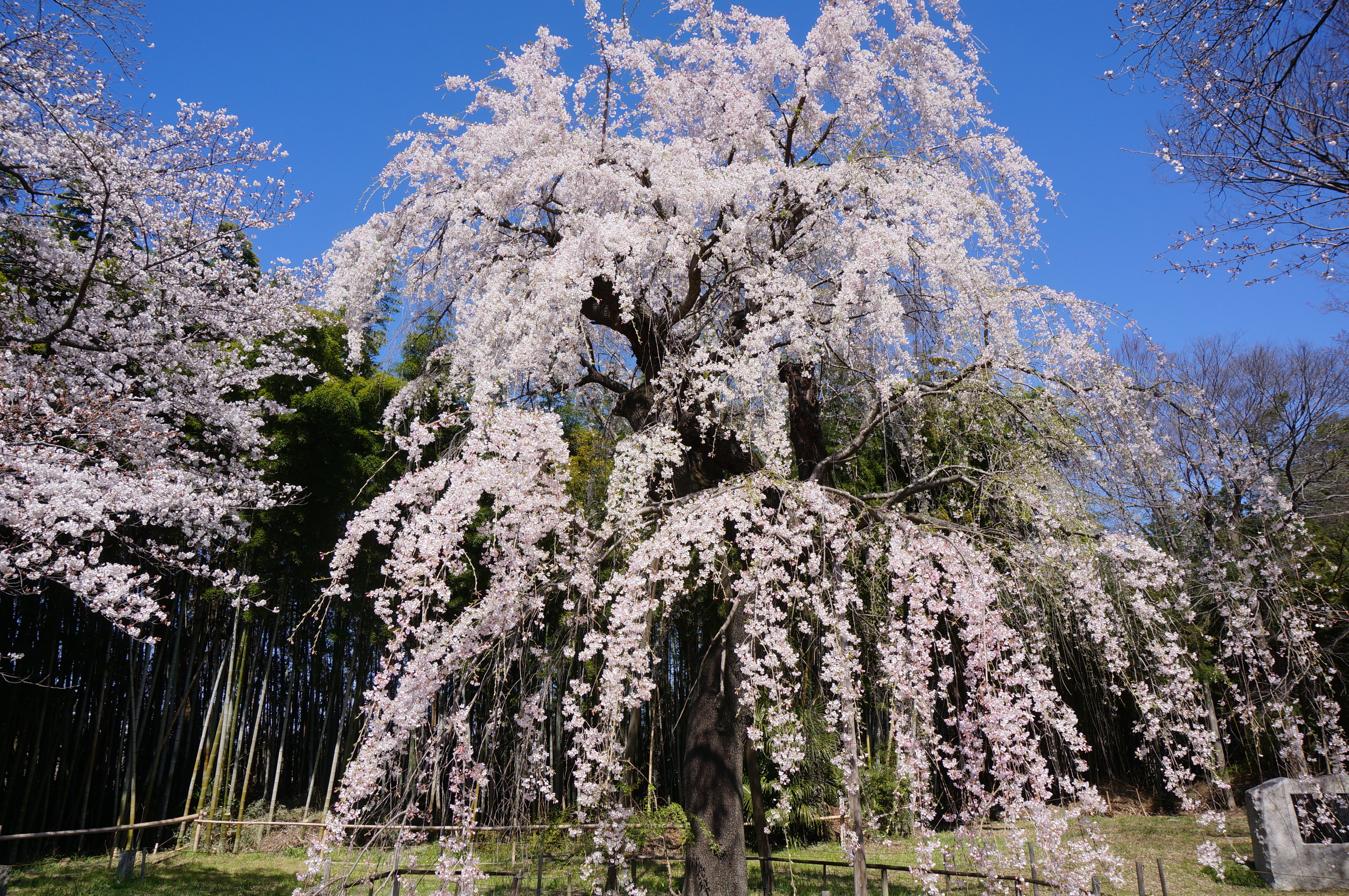
Prunus itosakura 'Pendula' Maxim. ('Shidare-zakura')

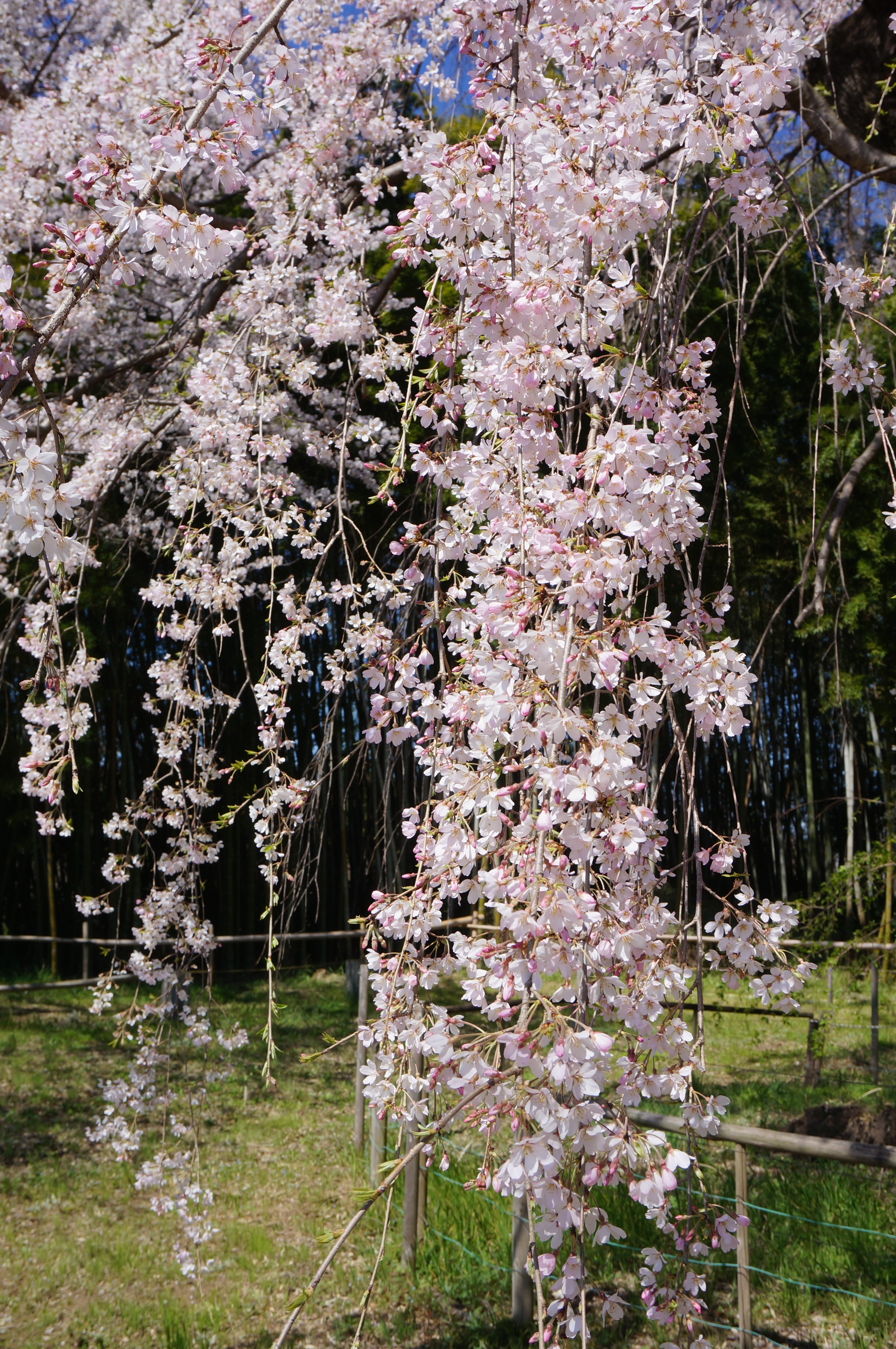
Prunus itosakura 'Pendula' Maxim. ('Shidare-zakura')

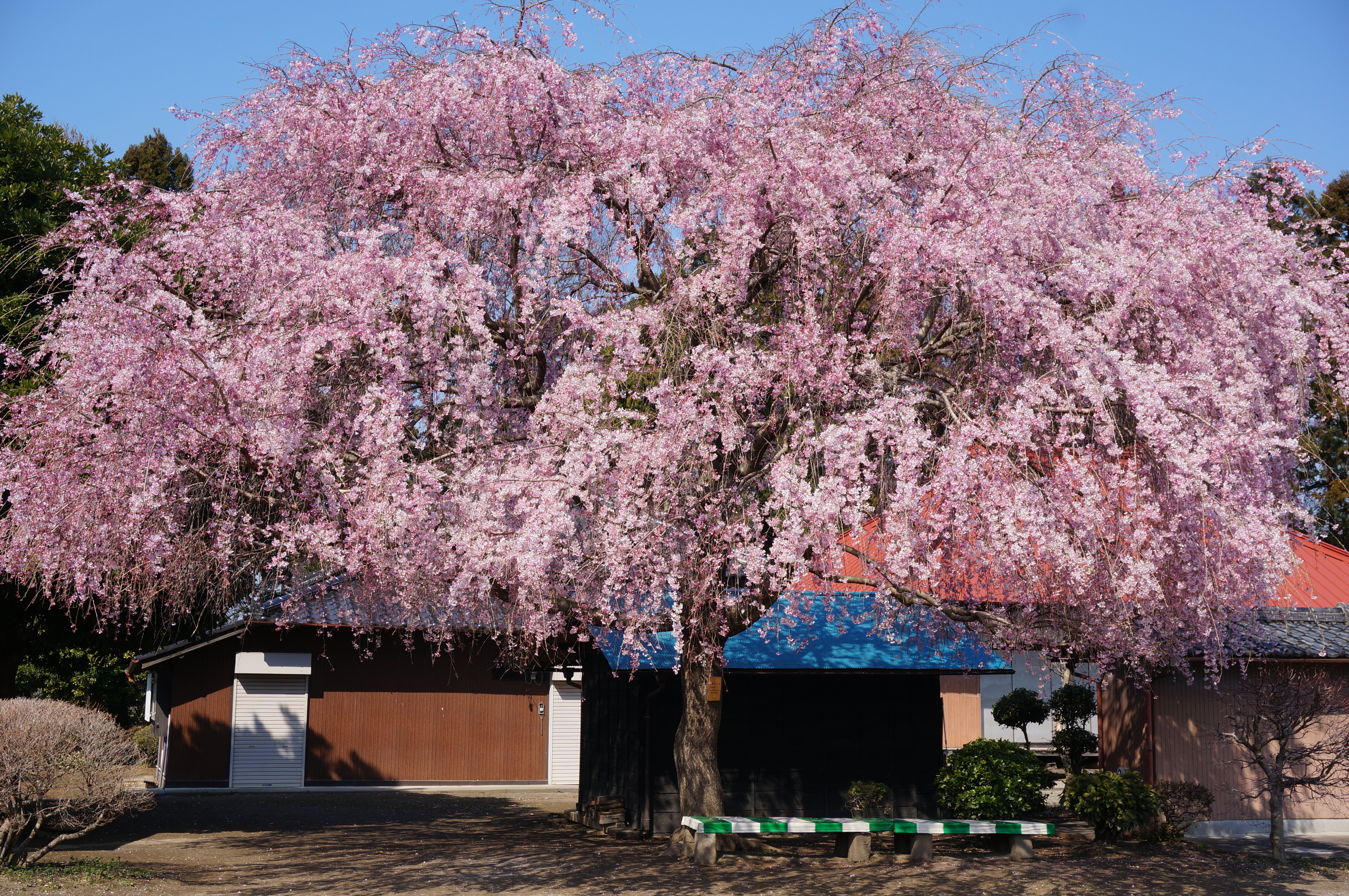
Prunus itosakura 'Pendula-rosea' ('Beni-shidare')

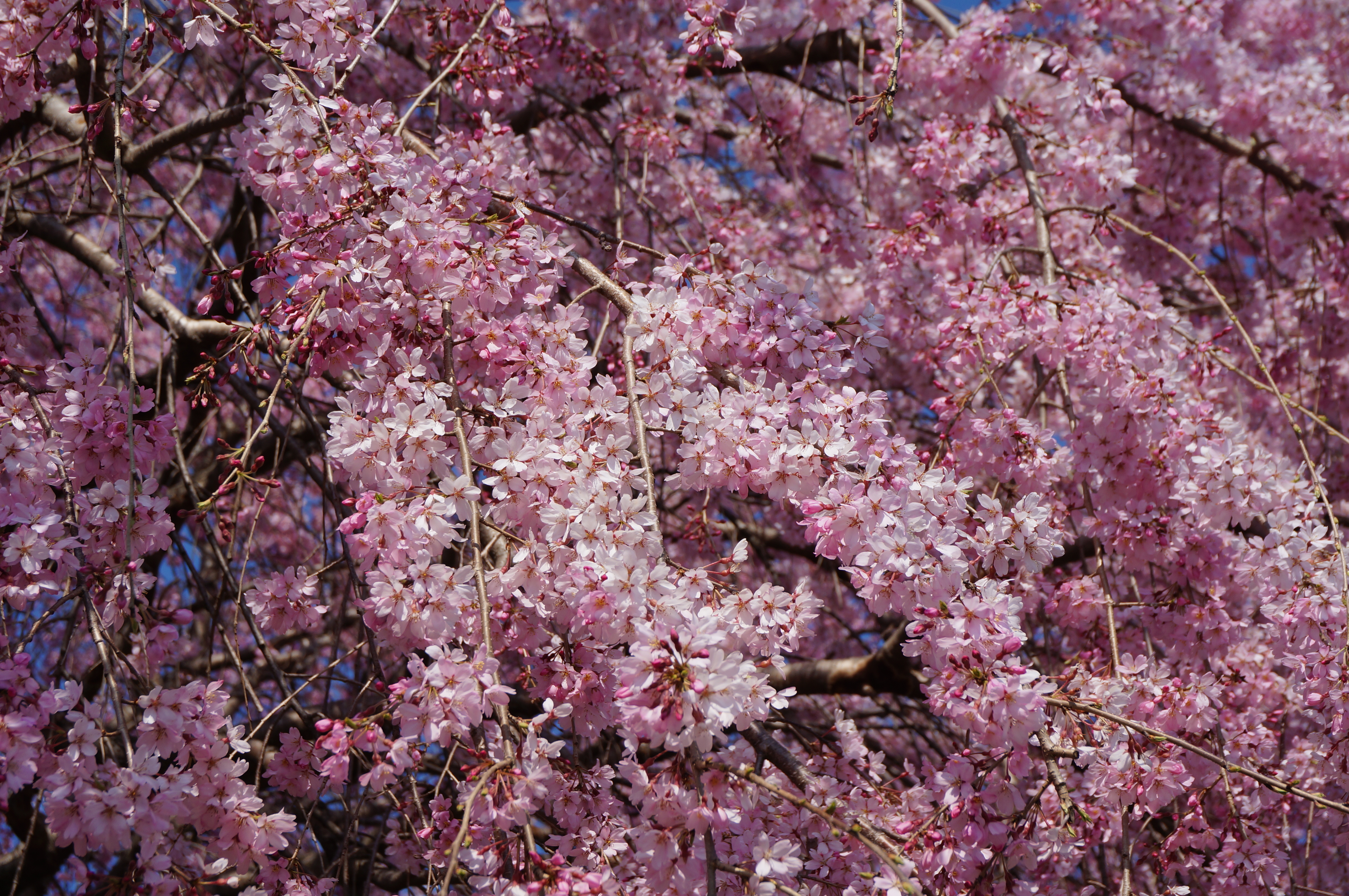
Prunus itosakura 'Pendula-rosea' ('Beni-shidare')

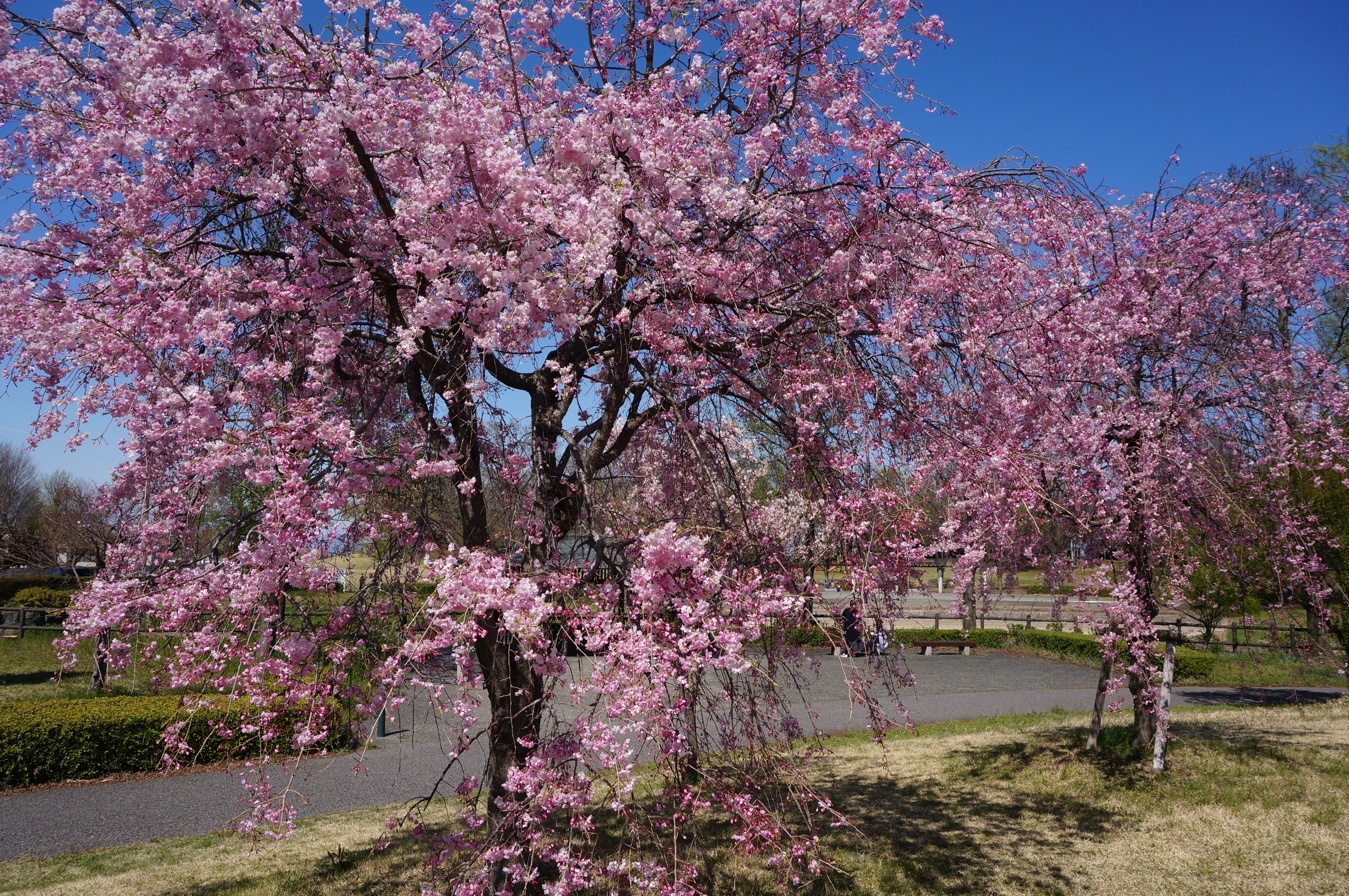
Prunus itosakura 'Plena-rosea' Miyoshi ('Yae-beni-shidare')

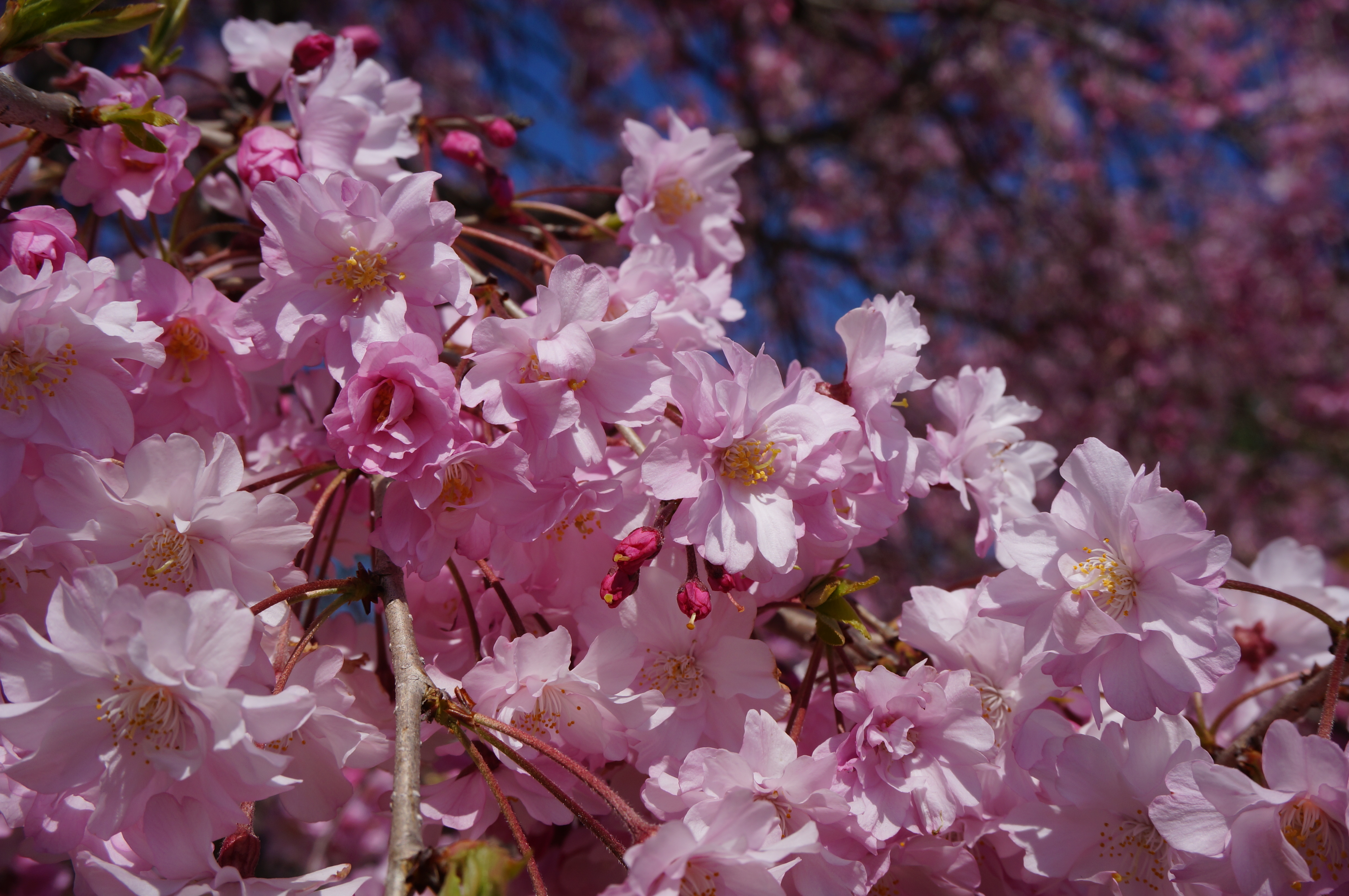
Prunus itosakura 'Plena-rosea' Miyoshi ('Yae-beni-shidare')

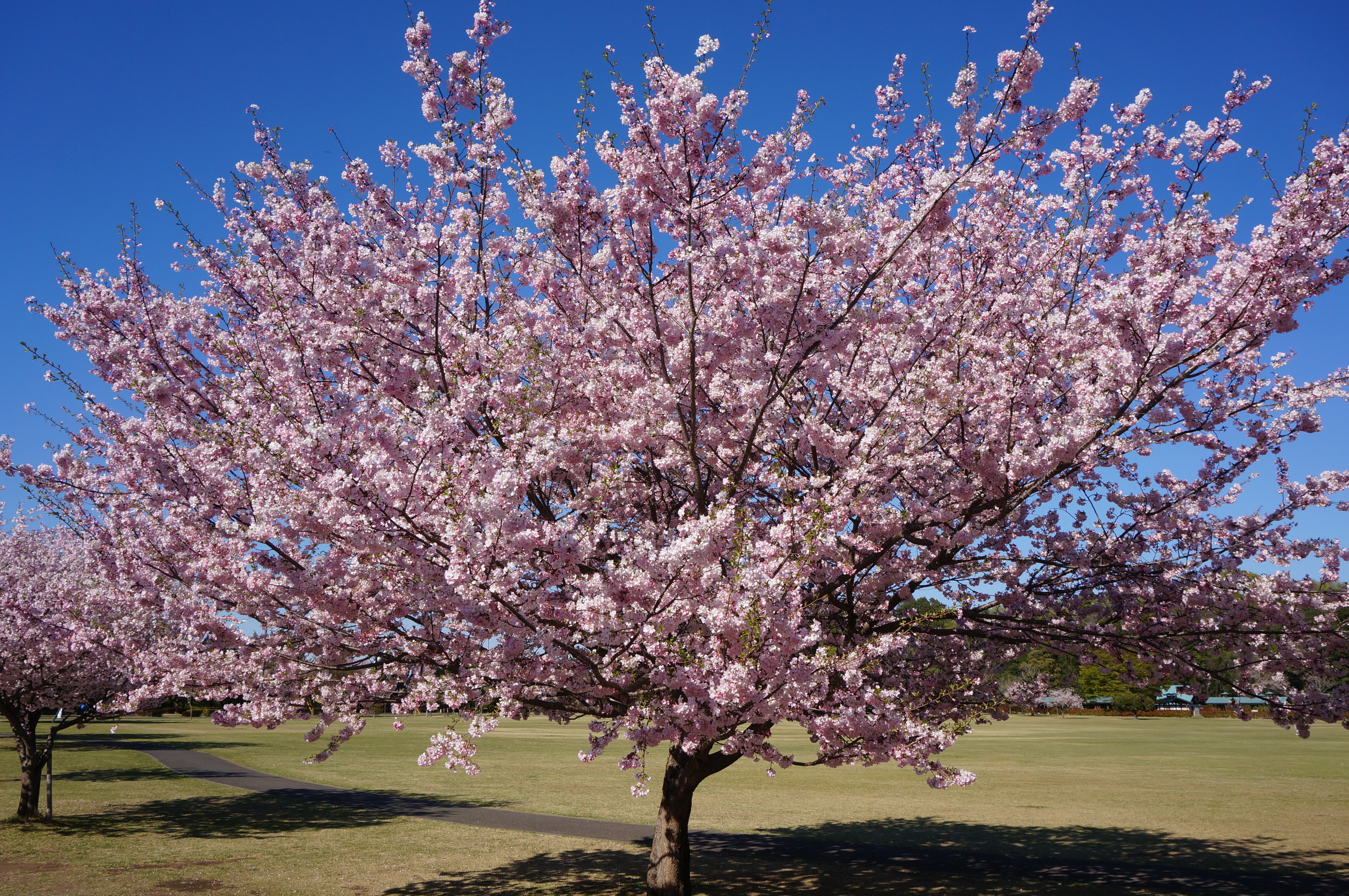
P. × subhirtella 'Omoigawa'

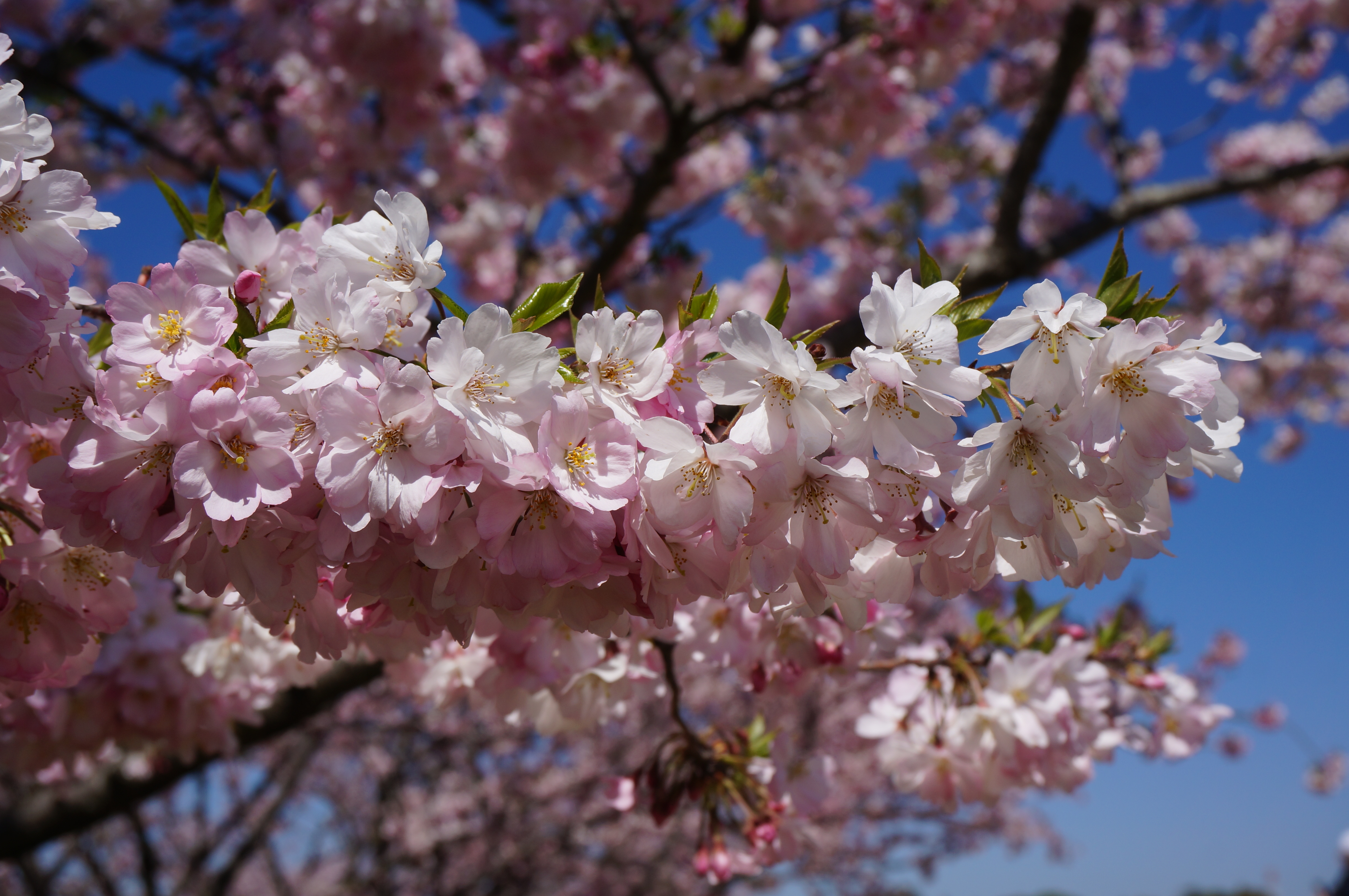
P. × subhirtella 'Omoigawa'

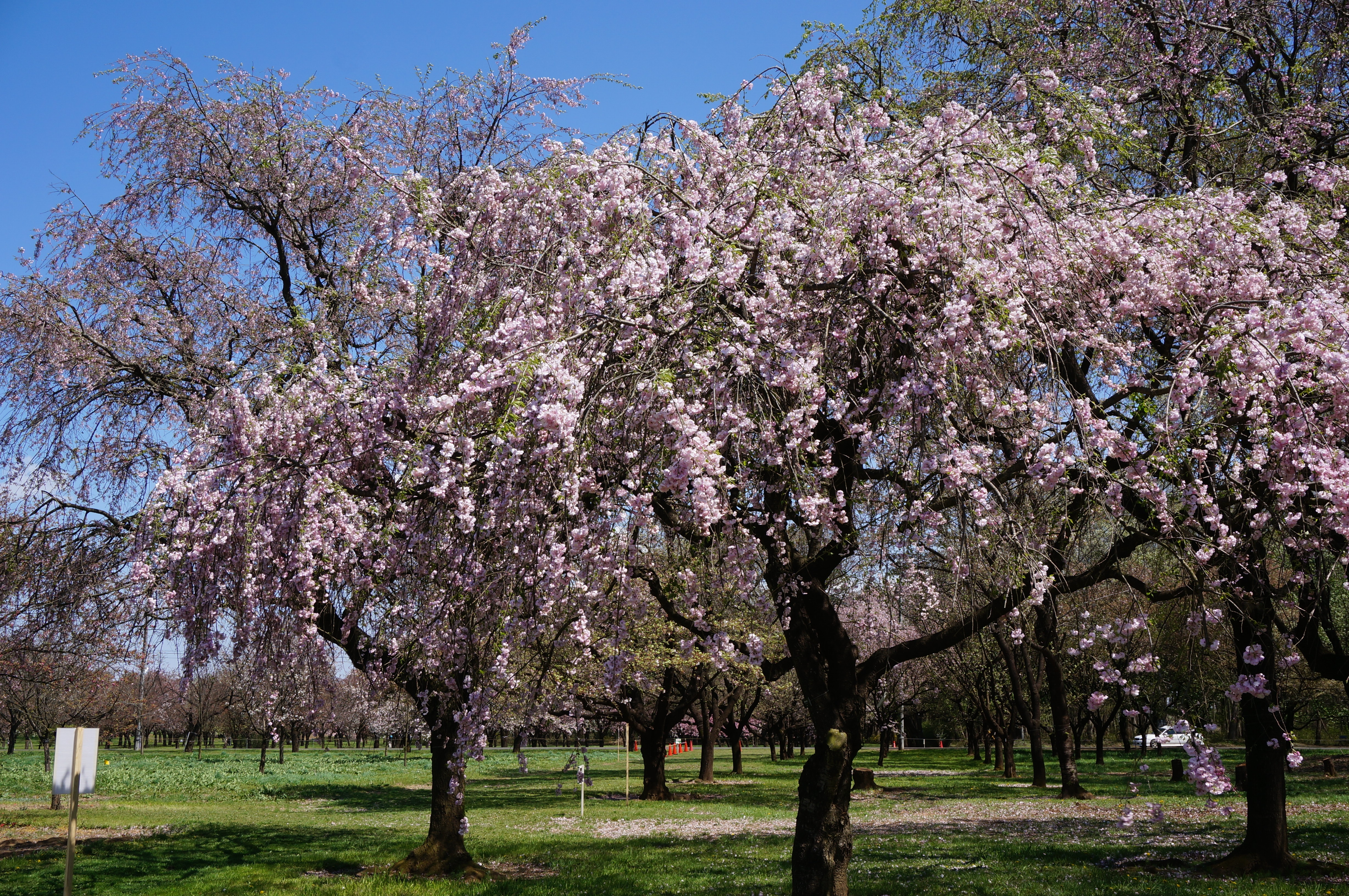
P. × subhirtella 'Ujou-shidare'

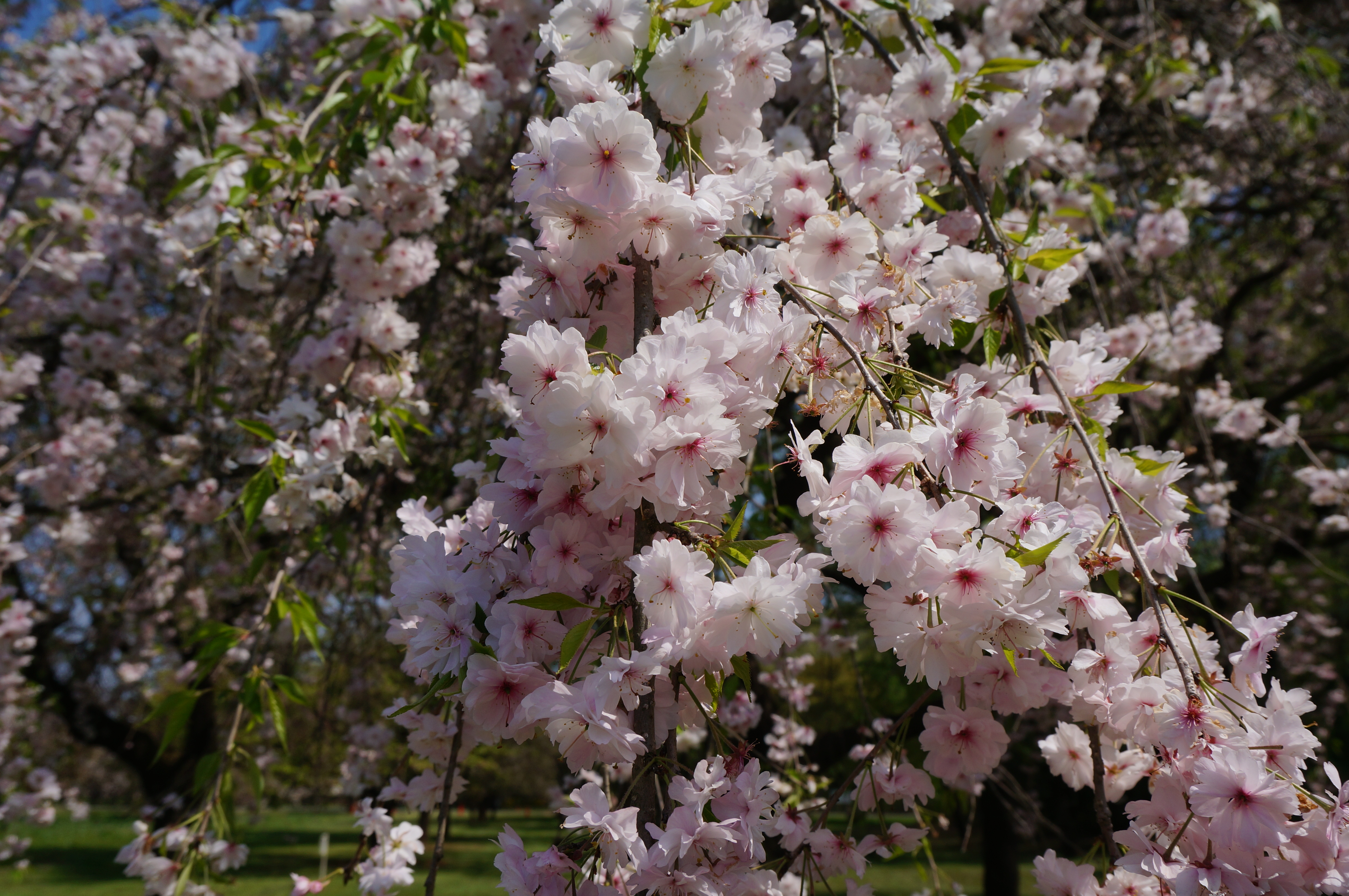
P. × subhirtella 'Ujou-shidare'
