= Prunus × hillieri =

Scientific classification
- Kingdom: Plantae
- Clade: Tracheophytes
- Clade: Angiosperms
- Clade: Eudicots
- Clade: Rosids
- Order: Rosales
- Family: Rosaceae
- Genus: Prunus
- Subgenus: Prunus subg. Cerasus
- Section: P. sect. Cerasus
- Species: P. × hillieri

Binomial name
- Prunus × hillieri hort.

Synonyms
- Cerasus hillieri; Prunus hillieri; Prunus 'Spire'

Hybrid species of tree

Prunus × hillieri is the result of a cross between Prunus incisa (Fuji cherry) and Prunus sargentii (hill cherry). The most famous cultivar is 'Spire', which was developed from a sport discovered growing in Hillier and Sons nursery of Winchester. Growing to 10 m (33 ft), with at most a 7 m (23 ft) spread, 'Spire's columnar growth form and pink flowers make it quite useful in particular landscaping applications. It is regularly used as a street tree. In 1993 'Spire' won the Royal Horticultural Society's Award of Garden Merit.
