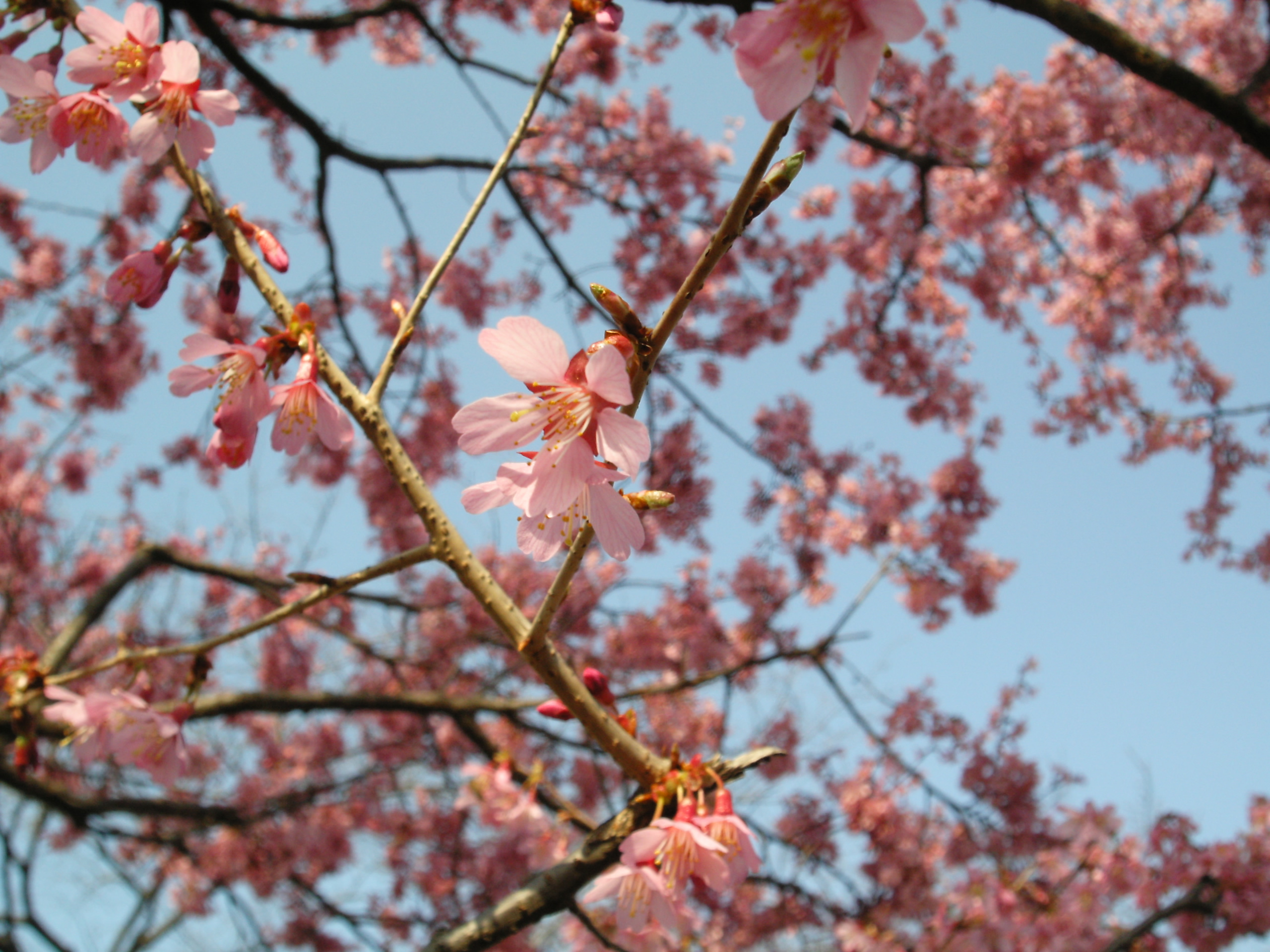

Scientific classification
- Kingdom: Plantae
- Clade: Tracheophytes
- Clade: Angiosperms
- Clade: Eudicots
- Clade: Rosids
- Order: Rosales
- Family: Rosaceae
- Genus: Prunus
- Subgenus: Prunus subg. Cerasus
- Section: P. sect. Cerasus
- Species: P. × incam

Binomial name
- Prunus × incam (Ingram) ex R. Olsen & Whittemore, 2009

Synonyms
- Prunus incam; Prunus incamp; Prunus × incamp (Note: spelling and orthographic variants)

= Prunus × incam =

Hybrid species of tree

Prunus × incam, sometimes called the Okamé cherry, although that name rightly belongs to its Okamé cultivar, is a hybrid species of flowering cherry, the result of a cross between Prunus incisa (Fuji cherry) and Prunus campanulata (Taiwan or bellflower cherry). It is a small tree, reaching 8 m, with silver bark and showy pink flowers. Its leaves are obovate or oblanceolate, 47 to 70 mm long and 22 to 31 mm wide. Its fall foliage is an attractive bronze-orangish-red. Due to its hybrid nature, fruit are rarely produced even though it produces large amounts of pollen, and so it is propagated and sold commercially by cuttings.

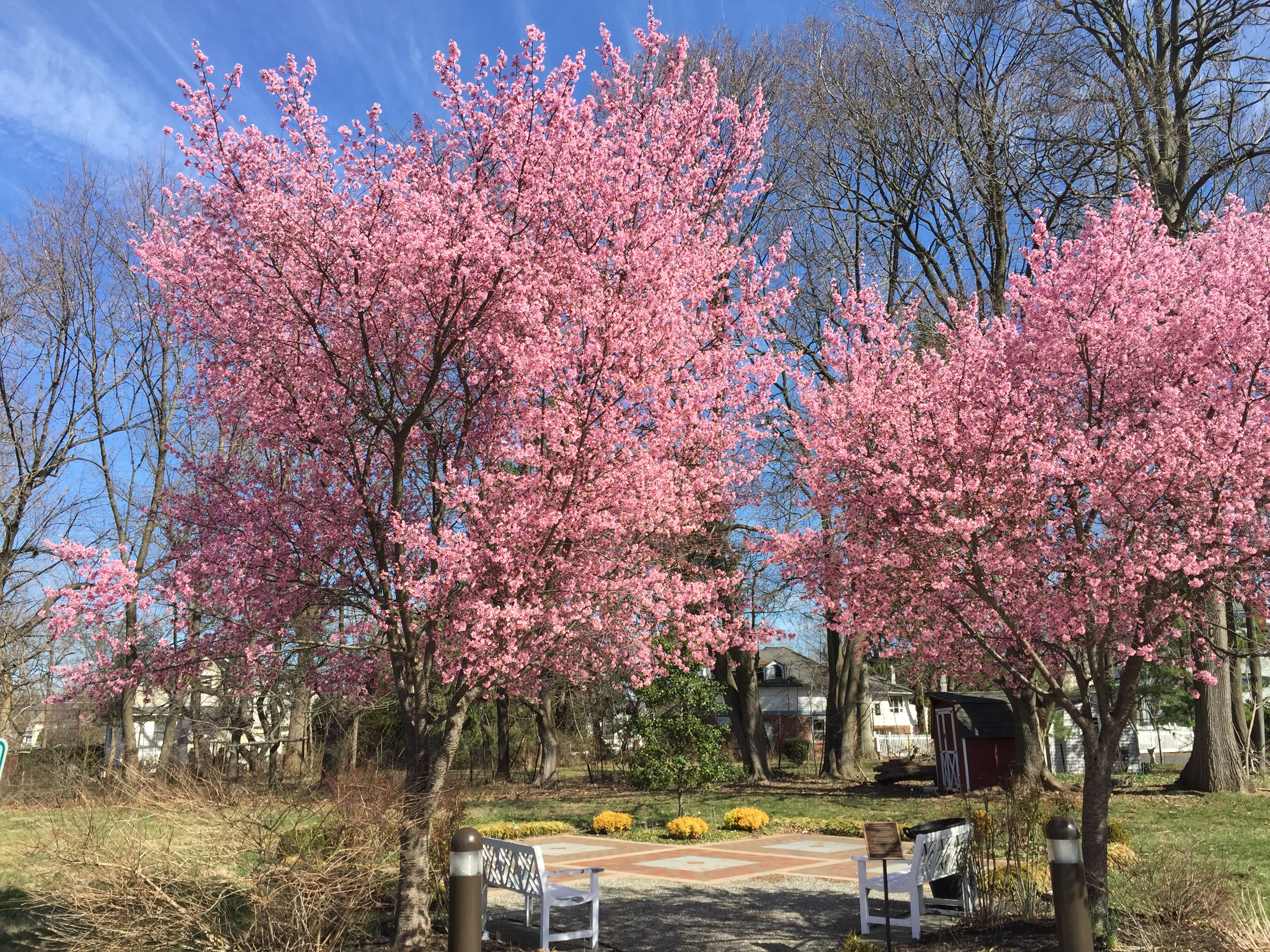
In bloom in March; New Jersey, USA

Prunus × incam was developed by Collingwood Ingram before 1942 (Note: Ingram debuted his Okamé cultivar in 1942) by pollinating Prunus incisa with pollen from Prunus campanulata. In 1993 the 'Okamé' cultivar won the Royal Horticultural Society's Award of Garden Merit, and in 2012 the 'Shosar' cultivar also won the Award. In addition to having a longer flowering period than most cherries, their inflorescences retain their red sepals and hypanthia for one or two weeks after the deeply emarginate petals have fallen, increasing their ornamental value. A number of cultivars are commercially available.
