= Prunus subhirtella 'Pendula' =

Ornamental plant cultivar

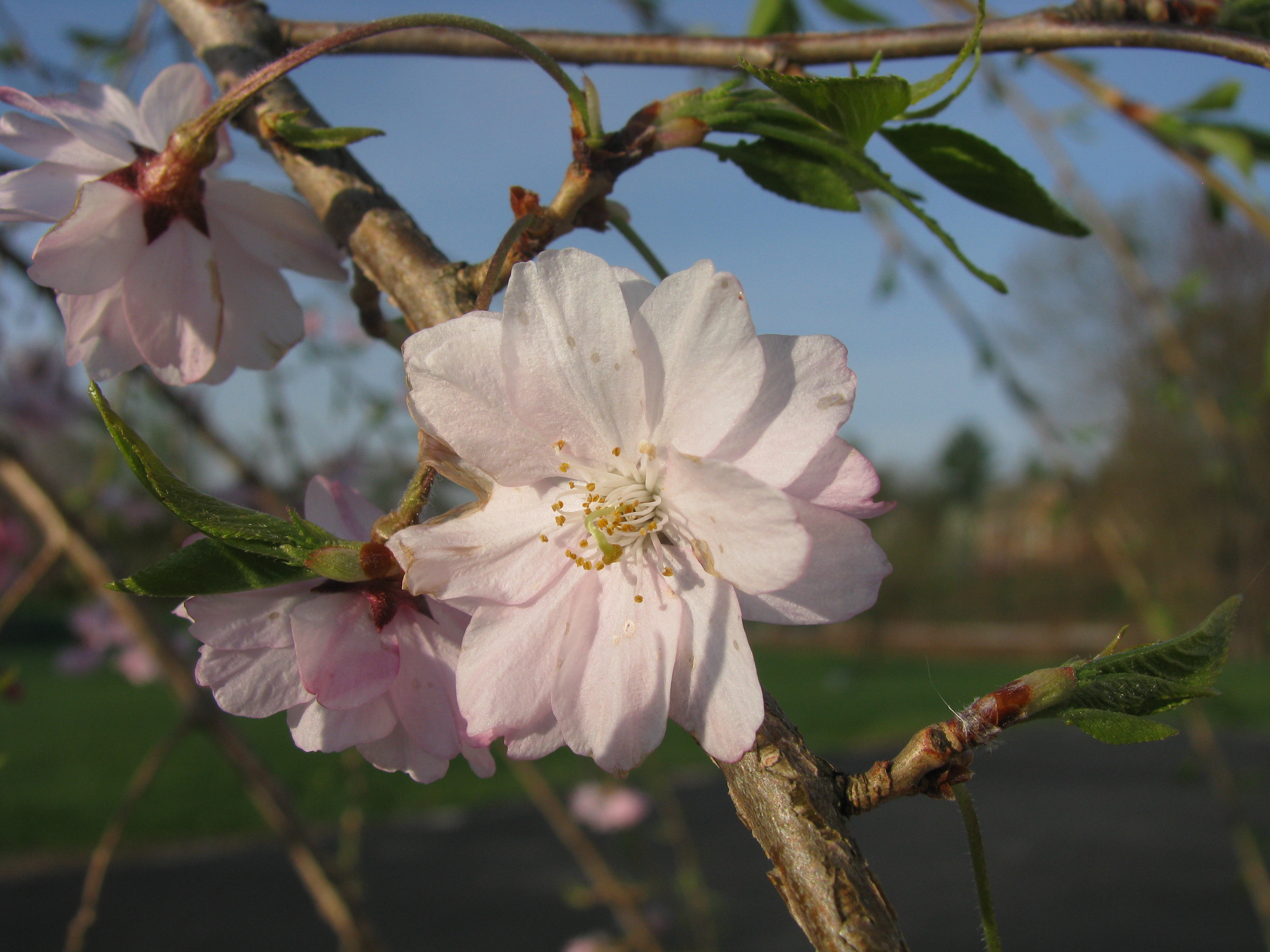
- "Weeping Higan Cherry"
- Genus: Prunus
- Species: Prunus subhirtella
- Cultivar: 'Pendula'

Prunus subhirtella 'Pendula' also called the Weeping Higan Cherry grows 20 to 30 feet tall and spreads 15 to 25 feet in a weeping habit. The leaves stay glossy green throughout the summer and into the fall when they turn a vivid yellow before leaving the tree bare in winter. The Weeping Higan Cherry blooms in the spring, having light pink (almost white) flowers that cover the branches before the leaves emerge. They are not native to North America but grow in USDA hardiness zones 5 through 8.

== Description ==
The Weeping Higan Cherry grows to a height 20 to 30 feet (6 to 9 m) with a spread of 15 to 25 feet (5 to 8 m). It grows with an irregular outline or silhouette dense crown with a weeping crown shape. It has a fast growth rate.

=== Flower and fruit ===
They flower in the spring with a very showy display. The one-inch (25 mm) diameter flowers are light pink (almost white). The fruit is oval in shape, less than 1/2 inch (13 mm) and black in color. The fruit attracts squirrels, deer and other mammals. The fruit is inconspicuous on the tree and causes no significant litter problem.

=== Trunk and branches ===
The branches droop as the tree grows, and will require pruning for vehicular or pedestrian clearance beneath them. The branches are breakage resistant. The trees require pruning to develop strong structure during young growth.

== Diseases ==
Weeping Higan Cherry trees are rather prone to problems, particularly in dry soil.

- A type of bacterium can cause leaf spots and twig cankers. Small, reddish spots dry and drop out.
- A fungus can cause reddish spots which drop out leaving shot holes. Once the holes appear the leaves may fall from the tree and the disease is worse in wet weather.
- Black knot can cause black swellings or galls on the branches.
- Powdery mildew can cause a white coating on the leaves.
