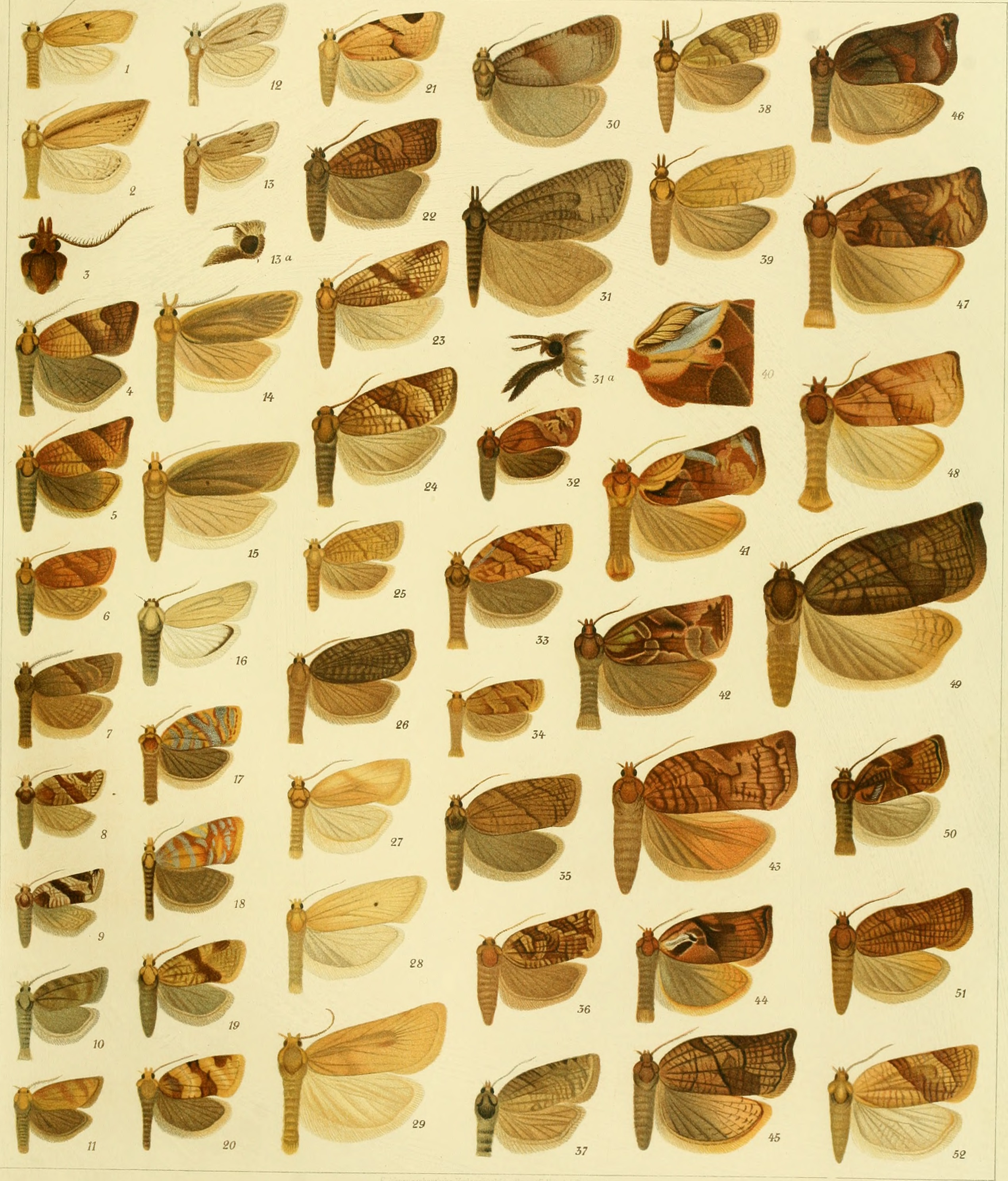
- Homonopsis illotana in Kennel Die palaearktischen tortriciden figure 26 male

Scientific classification
- Kingdom: Animalia
- Phylum: Arthropoda
- Clade: Pancrustacea
- Class: Insecta
- Order: Lepidoptera
- Family: Tortricidae
- Genus: Homonopsis
- Species: H. illotana

Binomial name
- Homonopsis illotana (Kennel, 1901)

Synonyms
- Dichelia (Capua) illotana Kennel, 1901

= Homonopsis illotana =

Species of moth

Homonopsis illotana is a species of moth of the family Tortricidae. It is found in China (Anhui, Fujian, Sichuan, Guizhou, Shaanxi), Korea, Japan and the Russian Far East (Primorye, Ussuri, Amur).

The wingspan is 14–18 mm for males and 18–21 mm for females. The ground colour of the forewings is cream brownish with metallic spots.

The larvae feed on Acer, Elaeagnus, Lyonia ovalifolia, Vaccinium, Castanopsis, Quercus acutissima, Quercus glauca, Quercus serrata, Quercus variabilis, Abies, Larix, Picea, Reynoutria japonica, Malus pumila, Prunus incisa, Prunus mume, Prunus sargentii and Smilax china.
