= Prunus pendula =

Prunus pendula can refer to:

- Prunus pendula Anon., a synonym of Prunus campanulata Maxim.
- Prunus pendula K.Koch, a synonym of Prunus cerasus L.
- Prunus pendula Desf., a synonym of Prunus itosakura Siebold
- Prunus pendula Siebold ex Maxim., also a synonym of Prunus itosakura Siebold
