= List of Award of Garden Merit flowering cherries =

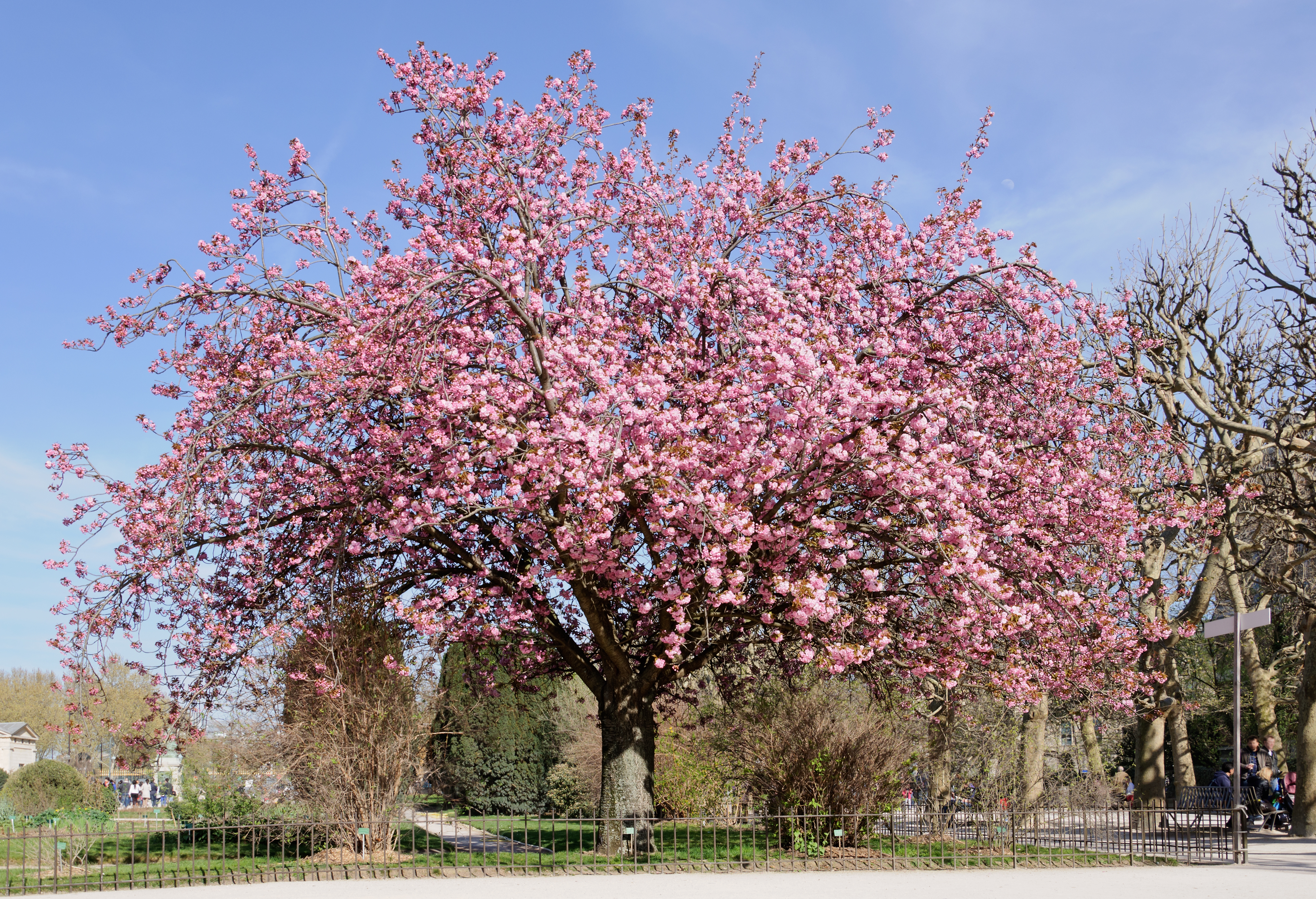
'Kanzan', Jardin des plantes, Paris, France

The following tree species and cultivars in the genus Prunus (family Rosaceae) currently (2016) hold the Royal Horticultural Society's Award of Garden Merit. All are described as flowering or ornamental cherries, though they have mixed parentage, and some have several or unknown parents. They are valued for their spring blossom, and in some cases ornamental fruit and bark. This list does not include the edible, or culinary, fruit trees in the genus Prunus (cherries, peaches, almonds, plums etc.). Dimensions shown are the maximum, which can often be restricted by regular pruning. Many cultivars also lend themselves to bonsai treatment.

A note on species names; where only Prunus is indicated, the species or hybrid name is unknown or conjectural.

Species	Cultivar name	Common name	Year	Ref	Flower	Form	Height	Spread	Image
Prunus	'Accolade'		1993		pink	semi-double	8m	8m	
Prunus	'Amanogawa'		1993		pale pink	semi-double	8m	4m	
Prunus	'Beni-yutaka'		2012		pink	double	12m	10m	
Prunus	'Collingwood Ingram'		2012		deep pink	single	8m	4m	
Prunus	'Fugenzo'		1993		pink	double	8m	10m	
Prunus	'Hanagasa'		2012		pale pink	double	8m	8m	
Prunus	'Ichiyo'		1993		shell pink	double	8m	8m	
Prunus	'Kanzan'		1993		deep pink	double	10m	10m	
Prunus	'Matsumae-fuki'		2012		white	single	8m	8m	
Prunus	'Pandora'		1993		pale pink	single	12m	8m	
Prunus	'Pink Perfection'		1993		pink	double	8m	8m	
Prunus	'Shirotae'		1993		white	double	6m	8m	
Prunus	'Shizuka'		2012		white	semi-double	12m	10m	
Prunus	'Shogetsu'		1993		white	double	5m	8m	
Prunus	'Spire'		1993		pale pink	single	10m	6m	
Prunus	'Sunset Boulevard'		2012		white	single	12m	4m	
Prunus	'Tai-haku'	Great white cherry	1993		white	single	8m	8m	
Prunus	'Taoyame'		2012		pale pink	semi-double	8m	8m	
Prunus	'The Bride'		2012		white/red	single	8m	8m	
Prunus	'Ukon'		1993		white	semi-double	8m	10m	
Prunus avium	'Plena'	Double gean	1993		white	double	20m	10m	
Prunus cerasifera	'Nigra'	Black cherry plum	1993		pink	single	12m	10m	
Prunus incisa f. yamadei			2012		white	single	8m	8m	
Prunus incisa	'Kojo-no-mai'		2012		white	single	2.5m	2.5m	
Prunus incisa	'Oshidori'		2012		pink	double	8m	8m	
Prunus laurocerasus	'Otto Luyken'	Cherry laurel	1993		white	single	1.0m	1.5m	
Prunus laurocerasus	'Rotundifolia'	Cherry laurel	2012		white	single	8m	4m	
Prunus lusitanica		Portugal laurel	1993		white	single	12m	10m	
Prunus mume	'Beni-chidori'		2012		deep pink	single	2.5m	2.5m	
Prunus padus	'Colorata'	Bird cherry	1993		pink		15m	10m	
Prunus padus	'Watereri'	Bird cherry	1993		white	single	12m	10m	
Prunus pendula	'Pendula Rubra'	Drooping cherry	1993		deep pink	single	4m	4m	
Prunus pendula f. ascendens	'Rosea'		2012		shell pink	single	8m	8m	
Prunus pendula	'Stellata'		2012		pink	single	4m	4m	
Prunus serrula	'Branklyn'	Tibetan cherry	2012		white	single	8m	8m	
Prunus × blireana		Blireana plum	1993		rose pink	double	4m	4m	
Prunus × cistena		Purple-leaf sand cherry	1993		pale pink	single	1.5m	1.5m	
Prunus × incam	'Okamé'		1993		carmine pink	single	12m	8m	
Prunus × incam	'Shosar'		2012		pink	single	8m	4m	
Prunus × yedoensis	'Somei-Yoshino'	Yoshino cherry	1993		white	single	15m	10m	

== See also ==
- Cherry
- Cherry blossom
- Hanami (Japanese cherry blossom festival)
- Prunus
