= Homonopsis rubens =

Scientific classification
- Kingdom: Animalia
- Phylum: Arthropoda
- Clade: Pancrustacea
- Class: Insecta
- Order: Lepidoptera
- Family: Tortricidae
- Genus: Homonopsis
- Species: H. rubens

Binomial name
- Homonopsis rubens Kuznetsov, 1976

Species of moth

Homonopsis rubens is a species of moth of the family Tortricidae. It is found in Korea and the Russian Far East (Ussuri).

The wingspan is 11–15 mm for males and 16–19 mm for females. The ground colour of the forewings is pale rufous.

The larvae feed on Alnus hirsuta, Menispermum dauricum and Abies holophylla.
