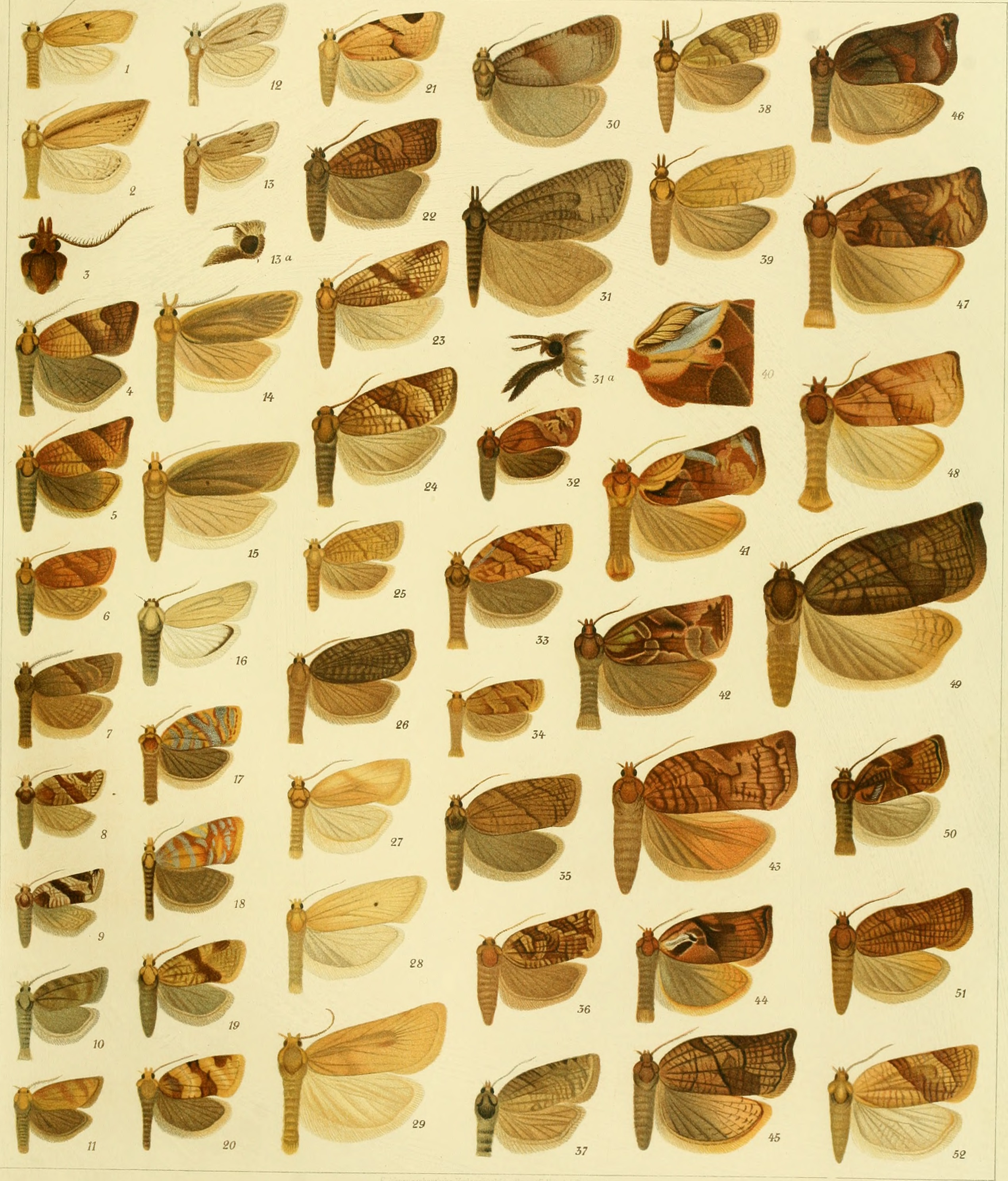
- Homonopsis illotana and Homonopsis foederatana in Kennel Die palaearktischen tortriciden figures 26,36 female

Scientific classification
- Kingdom: Animalia
- Phylum: Arthropoda
- Clade: Pancrustacea
- Class: Insecta
- Order: Lepidoptera
- Family: Tortricidae
- Tribe: Archipini
- Genus: Homonopsis; Kuznetsov, 1964

= Homonopsis =

Genus of tortrix moths

Homonopsis is a genus of moths belonging to the subfamily Tortricinae of the family Tortricidae.

== Species ==
- Homonopsis foederatana (Kennel, 1901)
- Homonopsis illotana (Kennel, 1901)
- Homonopsis multilata Wang Li & Wang, 2003
- Homonopsis rubens Kuznetsov, 1976

== See also ==
- List of Tortricidae genera
