= Homonopsis multilata =

Scientific classification
- Kingdom: Animalia
- Phylum: Arthropoda
- Clade: Pancrustacea
- Class: Insecta
- Order: Lepidoptera
- Family: Tortricidae
- Genus: Homonopsis
- Species: H. multilata

Binomial name
- Homonopsis multilata Wang Li & Wang, 2003

Species of moth

Homonopsis multilata is a species of moth of the family Tortricidae. It is found in China (Hebei, Henan, Sichuan, Guizhou).

The wingspan is 14.5-16.5 mm for males and 19.5–21 mm for females.
