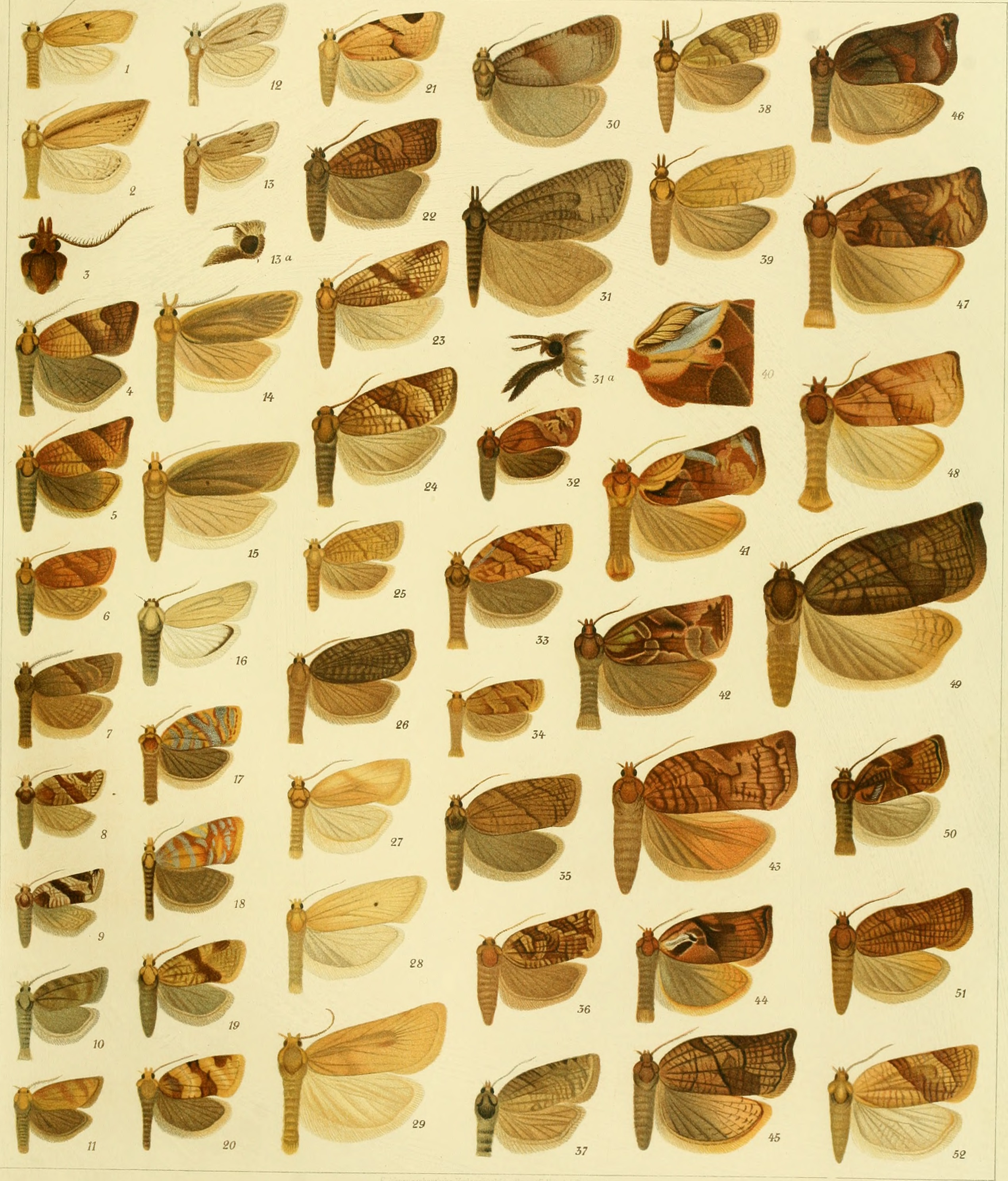
- Homonopsis foederatana in Kennel Die palaearktischen tortriciden figure 36 female

Scientific classification
- Kingdom: Animalia
- Phylum: Arthropoda
- Clade: Pancrustacea
- Class: Insecta
- Order: Lepidoptera
- Family: Tortricidae
- Genus: Homonopsis
- Species: H. foederatana

Binomial name
- Homonopsis foederatana (Kennel, 1901)

Synonyms
- Dichelia (Capua) foederatana Kennel, 1901

= Homonopsis foederatana =

Species of moth

Homonopsis foederatana is a species of moth of the family Tortricidae. It is found in Korea, Japan and the Russian Far East (Ussuri).

The wingspan is 16–21 mm (0.63–0.83 in) for males and 20–23 mm (0.79–0.91 in) for females. The ground colour of the forewings is pale yellowish brown.

The larvae feed on Quercus mongolica, Quercus variabilis, Abies species (including Abies alba and Abies firma), Larix, Picea, Malus pumila, Prunus x yedoensis, Pyrus pyrifolia, Salix and Taxus cuspidata.
