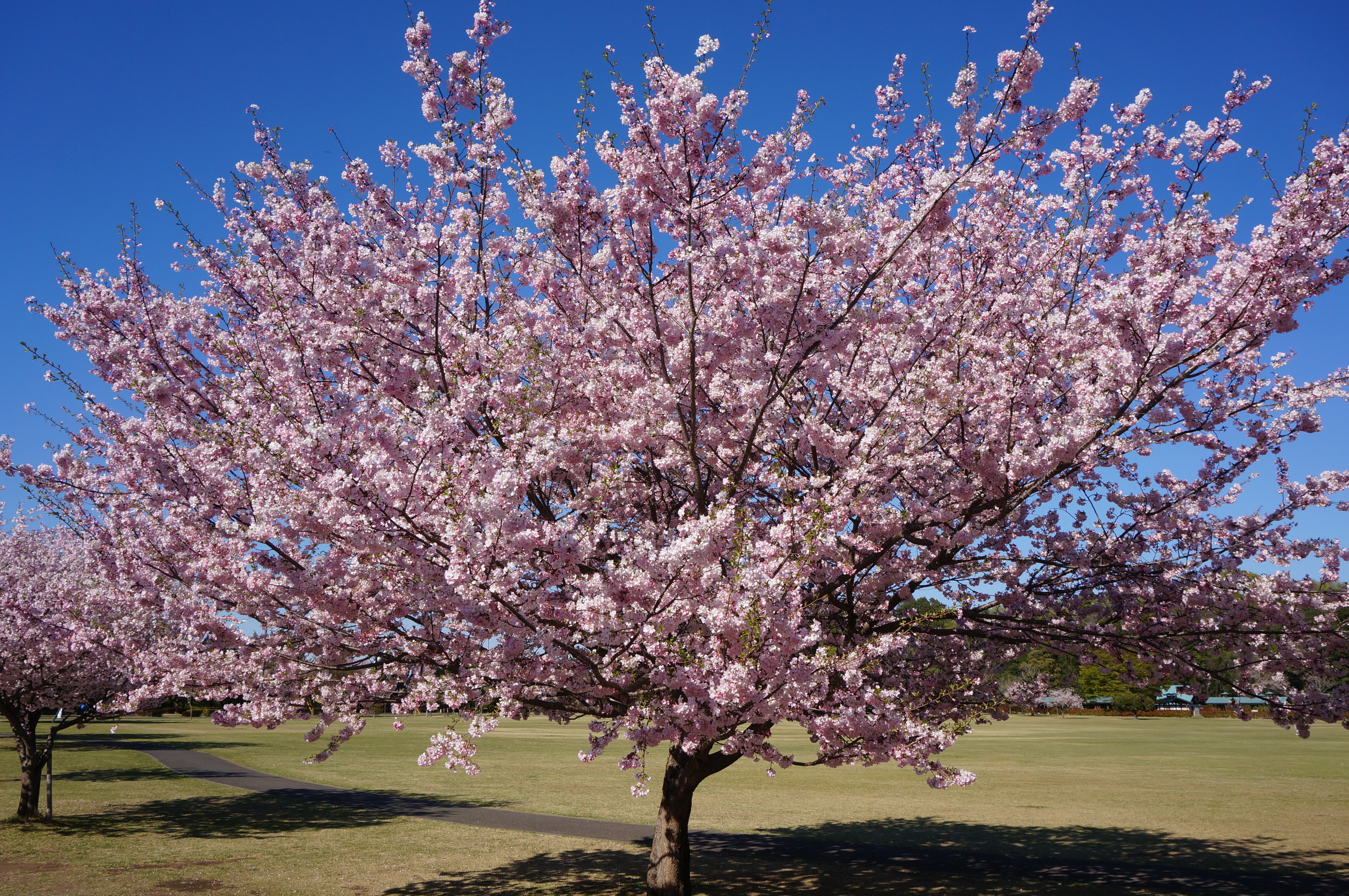
- Prunus ×subhirtella 'Omoigawa'

Scientific classification
- Kingdom: Plantae
- Clade: Tracheophytes
- Clade: Angiosperms
- Clade: Eudicots
- Clade: Rosids
- Order: Rosales
- Family: Rosaceae
- Genus: Prunus
- Subgenus: Prunus subg. Cerasus
- Species: P. × subhirtella

Binomial name
- Prunus × subhirtella Miq.: Cerasus itosakura var. koshiensis (Koidz.) H.Ohba & H.Ikeda; Cerasus × makinoana (Koehne) Kovalev & Kostina; Cerasus spachiana var. koshiensis (Koidz.) H.Ohba; Cerasus × subhirtella (Miq.) Masam. & S.Suzuki; Cerasus × subhirtella f. koshiensis (Koidz.) T.Katsuki & H.Ikeda; Cerasus × subhirtella f. tama-clivorum (Oohara, Seriz. & Wakab.) T.Katsuki & H.Ikeda; Cerasus × tamaclivorum (Oohara, Seriz. & Wakab.) Yonek.; Prunus × autumnalis (Makino) Koehne; Prunus × changyangensis (Ingram) Ingram; Prunus × kohigan Koidz.; Prunus × koshiensis Koidz.; Prunus × makinoana Koehne; Prunus pendula var. koshiensis (Koidz.) Ohwi; Prunus spachiana var. koshiensis (Koidz.) Kitam.; Prunus × subhirtella f. ogawana H.Kubota; Prunus × subhirtella f. omoigawa H.Kubota; Prunus × tama-clivorum Oohara, Seriz. & Wakab.

= Prunus × subhirtella =

Hybrid of tree

Prunus × subhirtella, the winter-flowering cherry, spring cherry, or rosebud cherry, is the scientific name for the hybrid between Prunus itosakura (edohigan) and Prunus incisa (Mamezakura). It is a small deciduous flowering tree originating in Japan, but unknown in the wild.

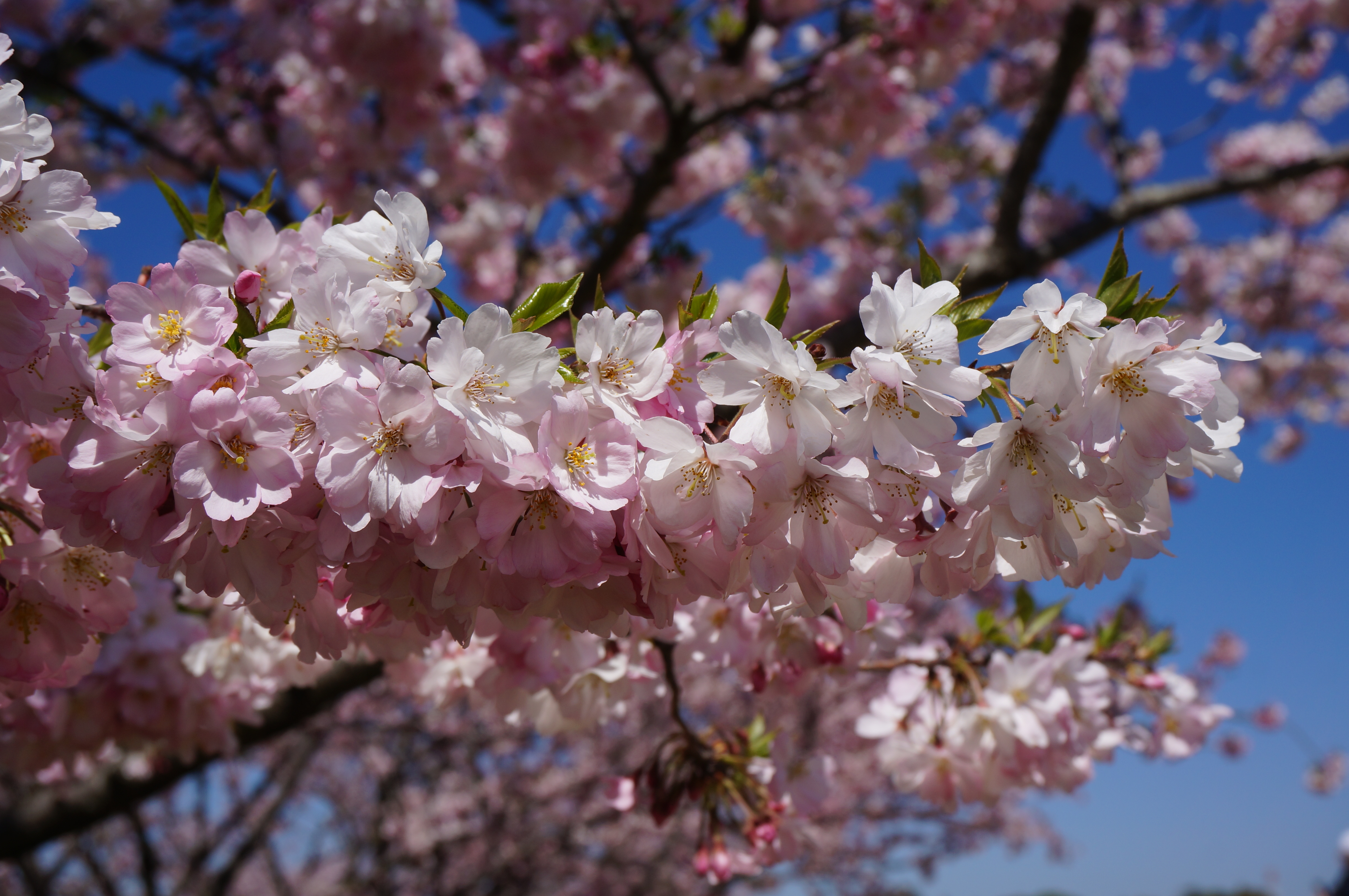
P. ×subhirtella 'Omoigawa'

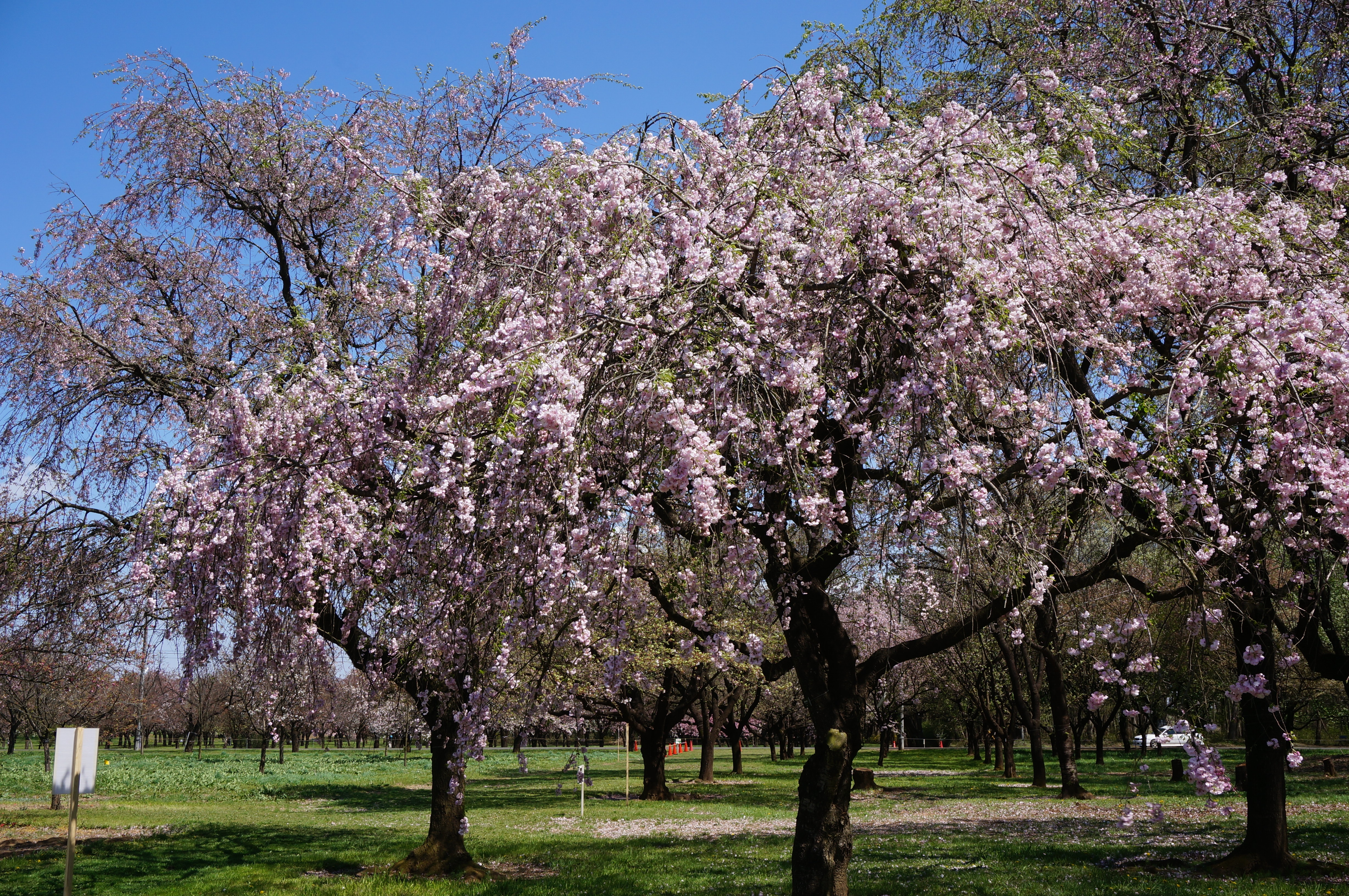
P. ×subhirtella 'Ujou-shidare'

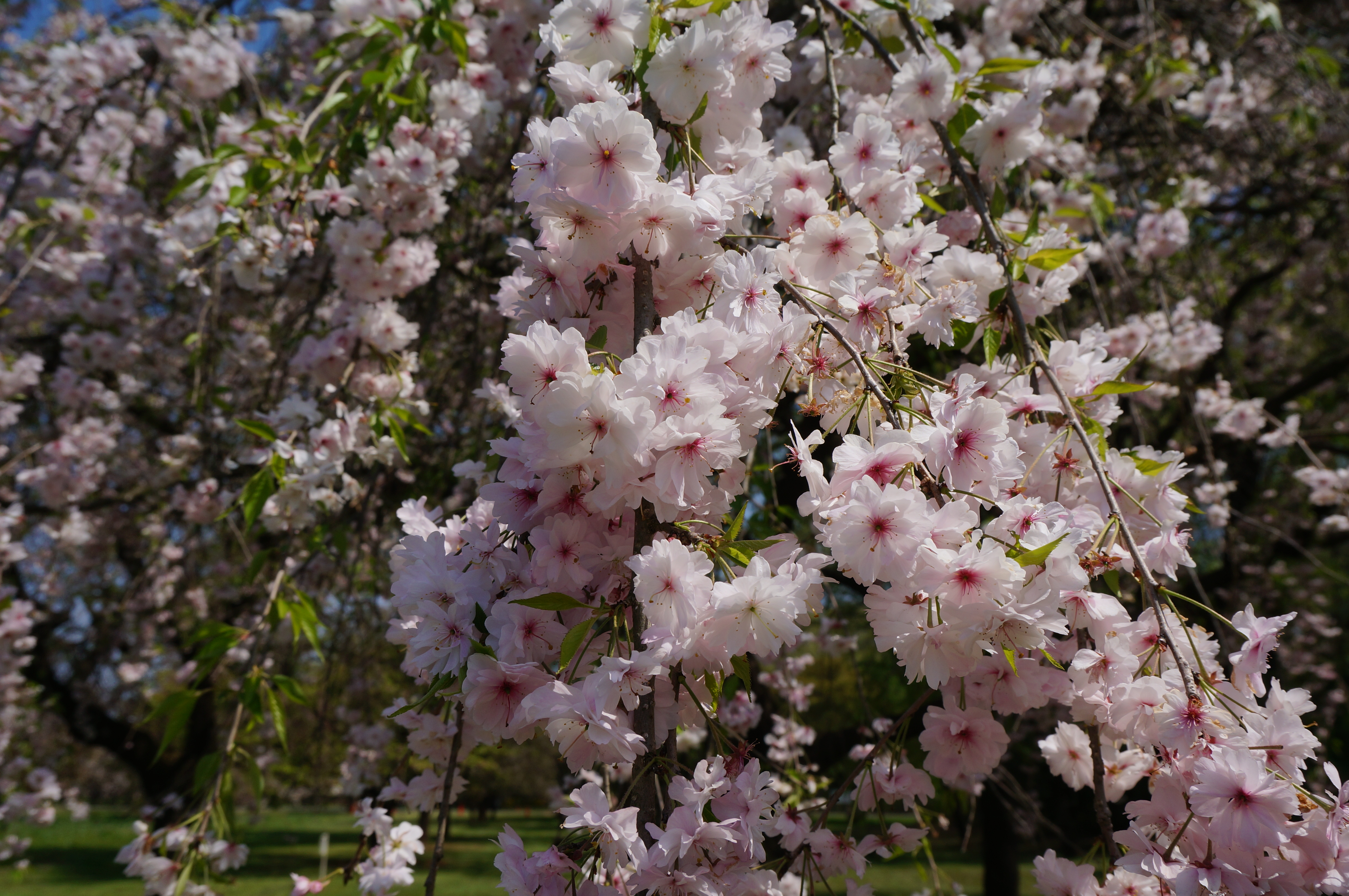
P. ×subhirtella 'Ujou-shidare'
