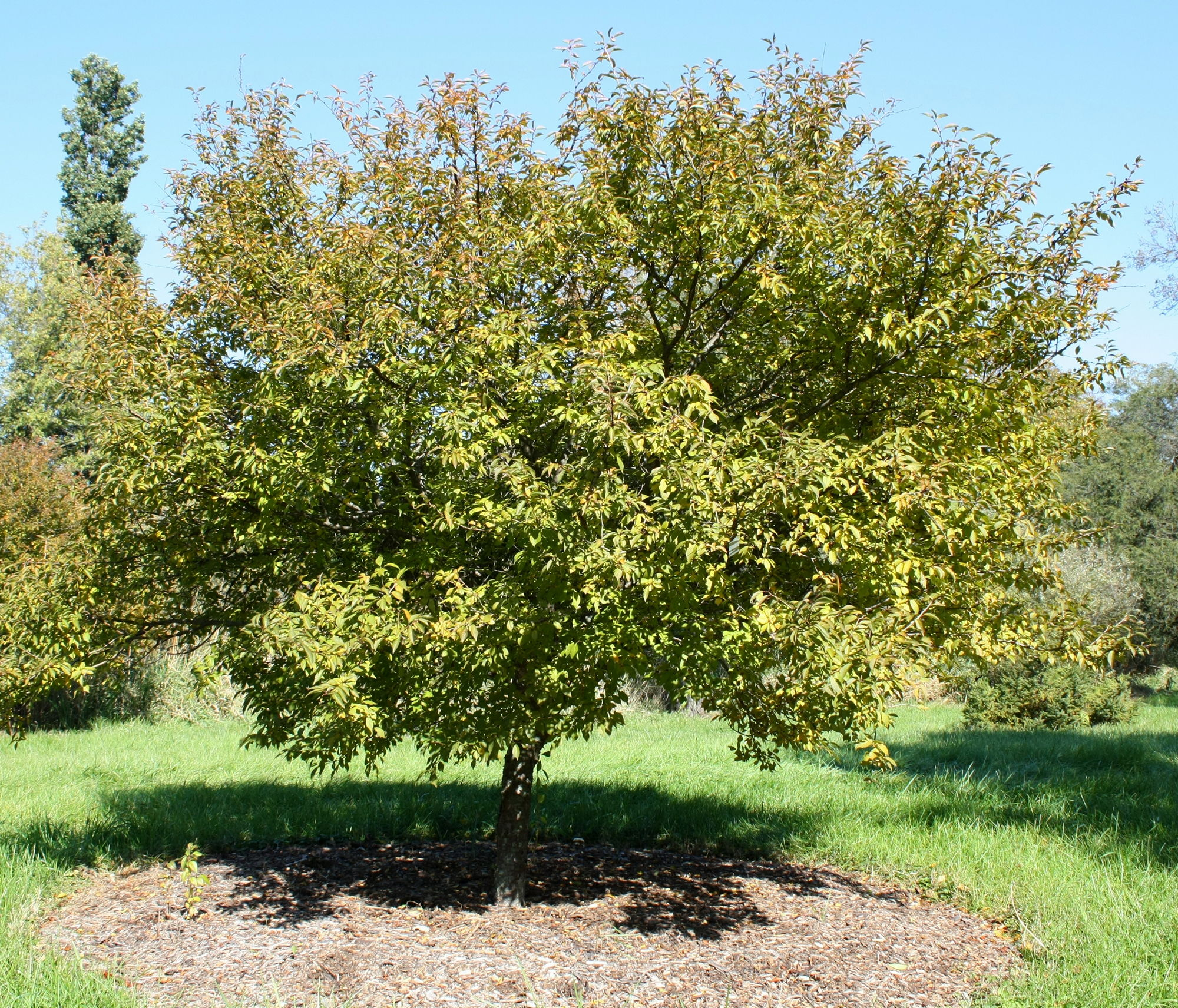
- Prunus incisa

Conservation status
- Data Deficient (IUCN 3.1)

Scientific classification
- Kingdom: Plantae
- Clade: Tracheophytes
- Clade: Angiosperms
- Clade: Eudicots
- Clade: Rosids
- Order: Rosales
- Family: Rosaceae
- Genus: Prunus
- Subgenus: Prunus subg. Cerasus
- Species: P. incisa

Binomial name
- Prunus incisa Thunb.

= Prunus incisa =

Species of tree

Prunus incisa, the Fuji cherry, is a species of flowering plant in the family Rosaceae, which gets its scientific name from the deep incisions on the leaves. It is an endemic species in Japan and grows wild in Kantō, Chūbu and Kinki regions. It is called the Fuji cherry because it grows in particular abundance around Mount Fuji and Hakone.

A dainty slow-growing, early white-flowering cherry tree, this century-old cultigen from Hondo, Japan is highly regarded as an ornamental, but the wood has no industrial value. It is hardy to −20 °C (−4 °F), and crossed with Prunus speciosa, has yielded the cultivar Prunus 'Umineko'. It is in the ornamental section Pseudocerasus of the cherry subgenus Cerasus of the genus Prunus. Ma et al. classified it in a group with Prunus nipponica.

The following cultivars have gained the Royal Horticultural Society's Award of Garden Merit:

- 'The Bride'
- 'Kojo-no-mai'
- 'Oshidori'
- Prunus incisa f. yamadei

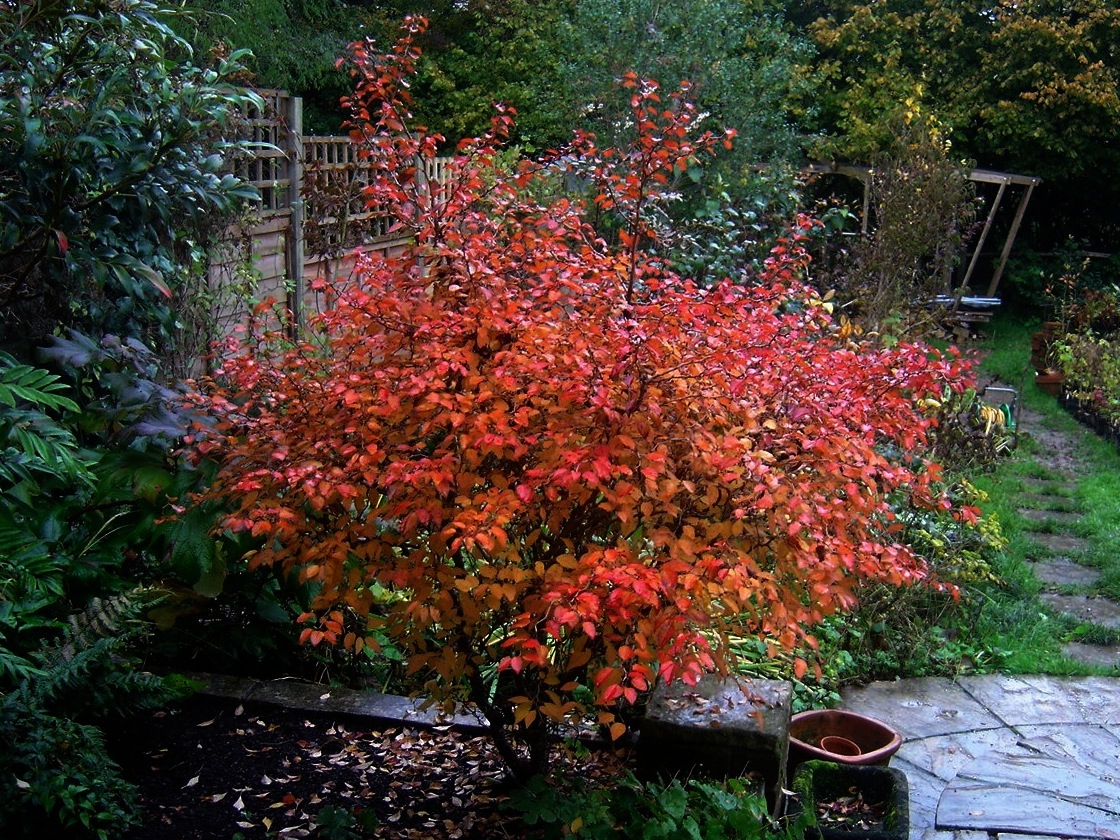
Cultivar 'Kojo-no-Mai' in autumn colours

'Kojo-no-Mai' is a cultivar suitable for the very small garden, as with judicious pruning it can be kept to a maximum size of 1.5–2 m (5–7 ft). In a large pot it will produce a dome of twiggy growth, and has the added bonus of brilliant autumn colour.

== See also ==
- List of Award of Garden Merit flowering cherries
