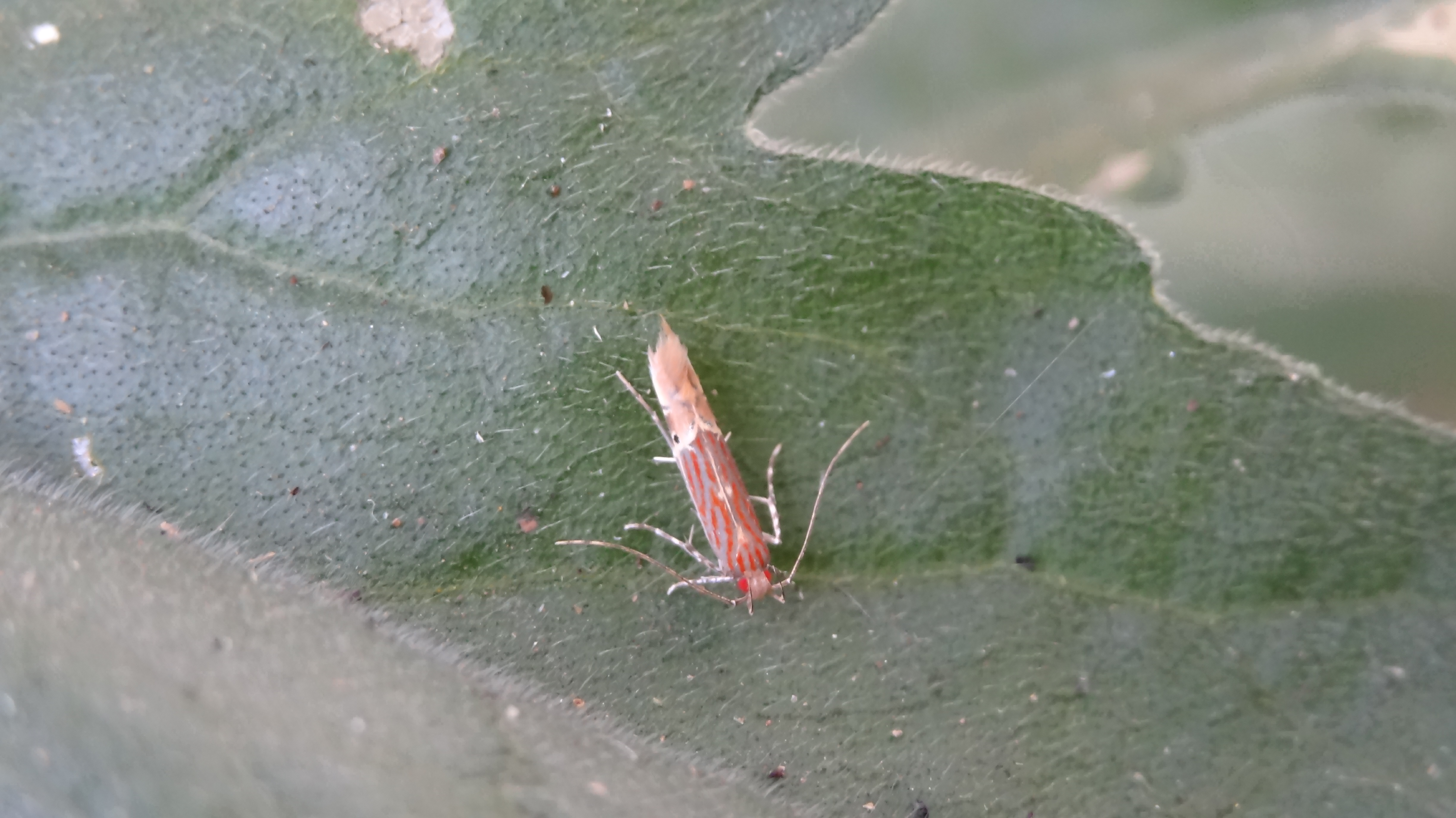

Scientific classification
- Kingdom: Animalia
- Phylum: Arthropoda
- Clade: Pancrustacea
- Class: Insecta
- Order: Lepidoptera
- Family: Cosmopterigidae
- Genus: Labdia
- Species: L. semicoccinea

Binomial name
- Labdia semicoccinea (Stainton, 1859)

Synonyms
- Pyroderces semicoccinea Stainton, 1859; Cosmopteryx semicoccinea; Labdia semicoccinae

= Labdia semicoccinea =

Species of moth

Labdia semicoccinea is a moth of the family Cosmopterigidae. It is found in Japan, Taiwan, Java, India, China and the Caucasus. It is an introduced species in parts of Europe.

The wingspan is 12–15 mm.

The larvae feed on Cajanus indicus, Polyscias, Zamis and Prunus donarium. They live in the stems of their host plant.
