= Yo Takenaka =

Japanese botanist (1903–1966)

- Born: 7 November 1903
- Died: 18 March 1966 (aged 62)
- Scientific career
- Fields: Plant genetics

Yo Takenaka (竹中 要 Takenaka Yō, 1903–1966) was a Japanese plant geneticist and a professor of Department of Cell Genetics, National Institute of Genetics. He is notable for researching the phylogenetic classification of cherry blossom. He discovered that Prunus × yedoensis is a crossbreed of two wild species of Japanese cherry; Prunus spachiana forma ascendens (Edo higan) and Prunus speciosa (Oshima zakura) by crossing experiments. He was also known as a researcher on Japanese morning glory and Nicotiana.

== Career ==
He was born in Hyōgo Prefecture, Japan in 1903. He graduated from the Department of Botany, Faculty of Science, Tokyo Imperial University in 1927. He was a professor of Keijō Imperial University from 1929 to 1945. After the end of war, he became a professor of National Institute of Genetics in 1949. He died on 18 March 1966 at the age of 62.

== Works ==
- "ソメイヨシノの起源" [The Origin of the Yoshino cherry]. 染色体 [La Kromosomo]. 21. 染色体学会 [The Society of Chromosome Research ]: 777–778. 1954.
- "サクラの研究(第1報) ソメイヨシノの起源" [Research on Cherry (1): The Origin of the Yoshino cherry]. 植物学雑誌 [Botanical Magazine]. Vol. 75. July 25, 1962. pp. 278–287.
- "サクラの研究(第2報) ソメイヨシノの起源" [Research on Cherry (2): The Origin of the Yoshino cherry]. 植物学雑誌 [Botanical Magazine]. Vol. 78. September 25, 1965. pp. 319–331.
- TAKENAKA, Yô (1963). "The Origin of the Yoshino cherry tree" (PDF). Journal of Heredity. 54 (5). Oxford University Press: 207–211. doi:10.1093/oxfordjournals.jhered.a107250.

== See also ==
- Jeju flowering cherry
