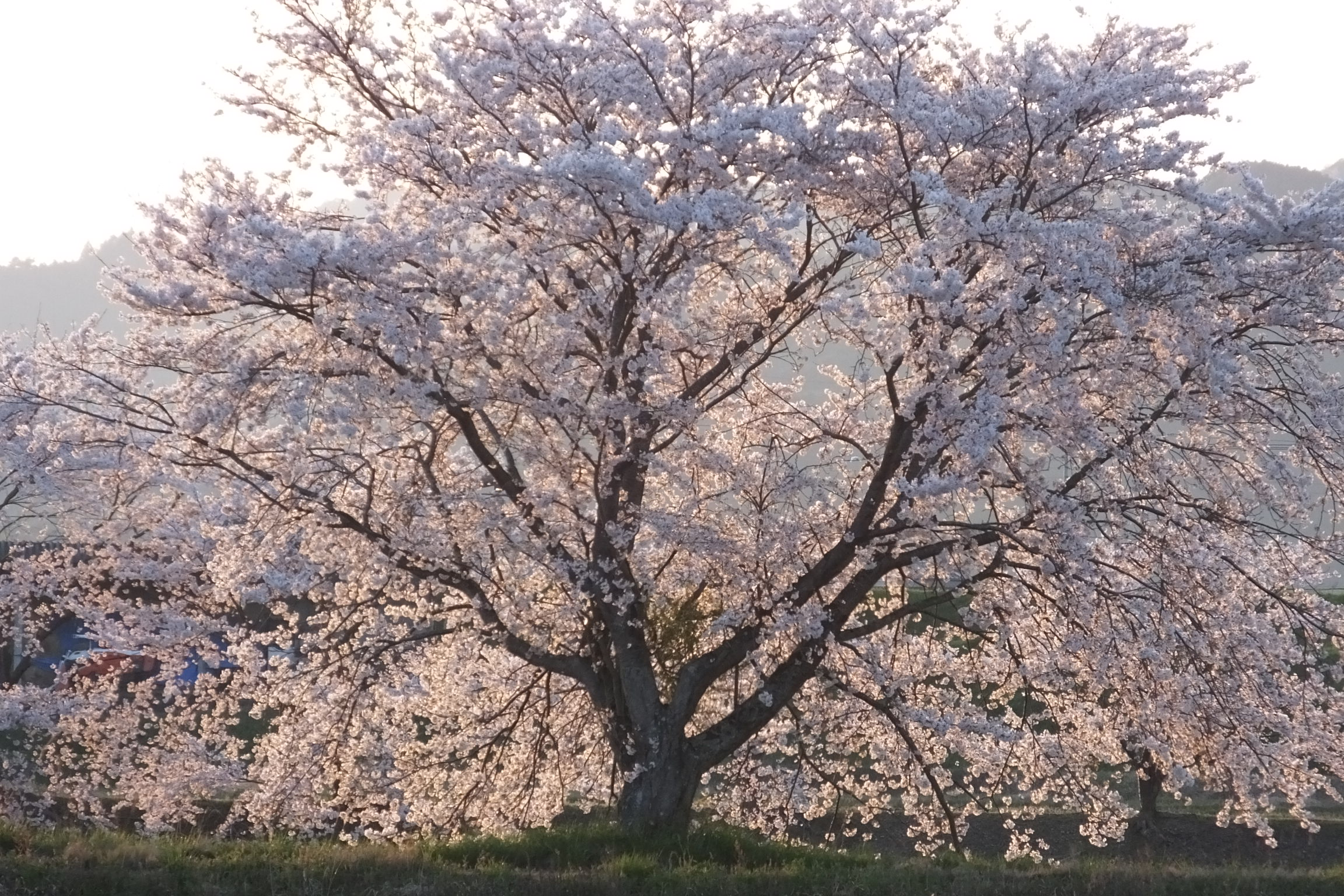
- Cherry tree in full bloom (Tamba-Sasayama, Hyogo)

Scientific classification
- Kingdom: Plantae
- Clade: Tracheophytes
- Clade: Angiosperms
- Clade: Eudicots
- Clade: Rosids
- Order: Rosales
- Family: Rosaceae
- Genus: Prunus
- Subgenus: Prunus subg. Cerasus
- Species: P. × yedoensis

Binomial name
- Prunus × yedoensis Matsum.

Synonyms
- Prunus nudiflora (Koehne) Koidz.; Prunus paracerasus Koehne

= Prunus × yedoensis =

Hybrid species of tree

Prunus × yedoensis (synonym Cerasus × yedoensis) is a hybrid cherry tree between Prunus speciosa (Oshima cherry) as father plant and Prunus pendula f. ascendens (syn. Prunus itosakura, Prunus subhirtella var. ascendens, Edo higan) as mother. It is a hybrid born in Japan and one of its cultivars, Prunus × yedoensis 'Somei-yoshino' or Yoshino cherry (Japanese: 染井吉野 or ソメイヨシノ, Hepburn: Somei Yoshino), is one of the most popular and widely planted cherry cultivars in temperate regions around the world today. 'Somei-yoshino' is a clone from a single tree, and has been propagated by grafting all over the world. 'Somei-yoshino' inherits Edo higan's quality of blooming before the leaves unfold and it growing into a large-sized tree. It also inherits the characteristics of the Oshima cherry, which grows rapidly and has white flowers. These characteristics are favored and have become one of the most popular cultivars of cherry trees.

One of the spots where P. × yedoensis grows wild is around Funabara Pass on the Izu Peninsula, which is close to the birthplace of its paternal species, Oshima cherry, and the wild P. × yedoensis in the area and the cultivar developed from it are called 'Funabara-yoshino'.

On April 1, 2019, the Kazusa DNA Research Institute, Shimane University and Kyoto Prefectural University announced that they had decoded all the genetic information of 'Somei-Yoshino', and it was revealed that 'Somei-yoshino' descended from Edo higan and Oshima cherry, as is commonly believed. It was also revealed that the two ancestral species separated into different species 5.52 million years ago, and that 'Somei-yoshino' was born by hybridization over 100 years ago.

Although it was not recognized as a 'Somei-Yoshino' at the time of planting, the oldest verifiable record of a 'Somei-Yoshino' tree being planted is a record of its planting in the Koishikawa Botanical Garden in 1775. There are also existing 'Somei-Yoshino' trees planted in Koishikawa Botanical Garden in 1875, in Kaiseizan Park in Kōriyama, Fukushima Prefecture in 1878, and in Hirosaki Castle in 1882, which are sometimes referred to as the oldest 'Somei-Yoshino' trees. As of 2019, the Tree Health Research Society, Japan has recognized the oldest surviving 'Somei-Yoshino' in Japan, the one on Kaiseizan Park planted in 1878, based on the results of radiocarbon dating and other scientific studies.

== Names ==
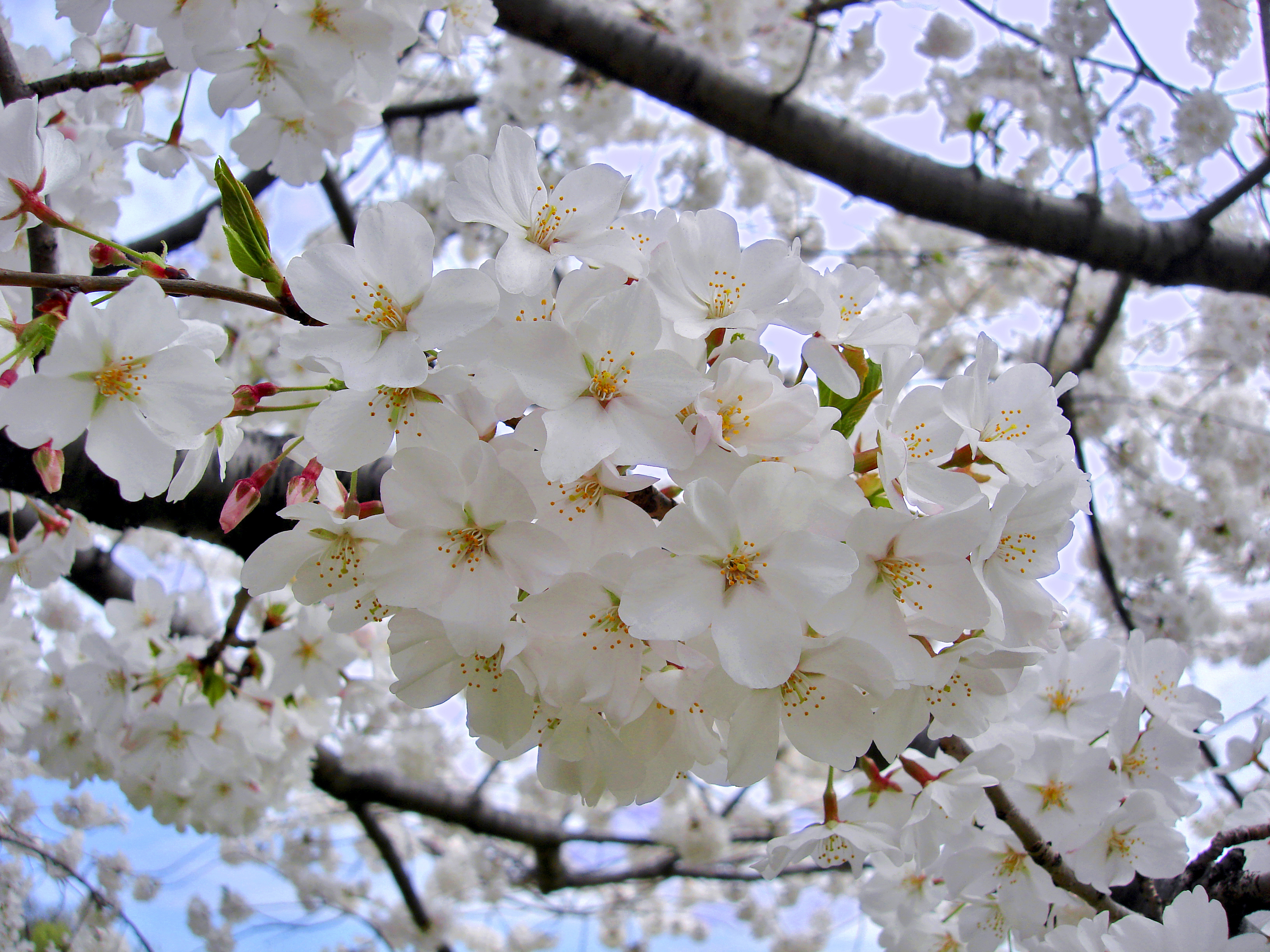
Yoshino cherry at Tidal Basin, Washington, D.C. Yoshino cherries are the most common cultivar in the population of cherry trees donated to the city by Japan.

In 1900, Yorinaga Fujino gave the Yoshino cherry the name Somei-yoshino after the famous place of cultivation, Somei village (current day Toshima) and famous place of Prunus jamasakura, Mount Yoshino. In 1901, the Yoshino cherry was given the scientific name Prunus yedoensis by Jinzō Matsumura. However, after Ernest Henry Wilson suggested Yoshino cherry is a hybrid between Prunus subhirtella var. ascendens (Edo higan) and Prunus lannesiana (Oshima cherry) in 1916, Yoshino cherry came to be called Prunus × yedoensis. As for the Korean native cherry called King cherry which was given a scientific name Prunus yedoensis var. nudiflora by a German botanist Bernhard Adalbert Emil Koehne in 1912 continues to be called Prunus yedoensis.

The Yoshino cherry has no scientific cultivar name because it is the original cultivar of this hybrid species Prunus × yedoensis. A new name, 'Somei-yoshino' is proposed in accordance with other cultivars of Prunus × yedoensis.

== Description ==
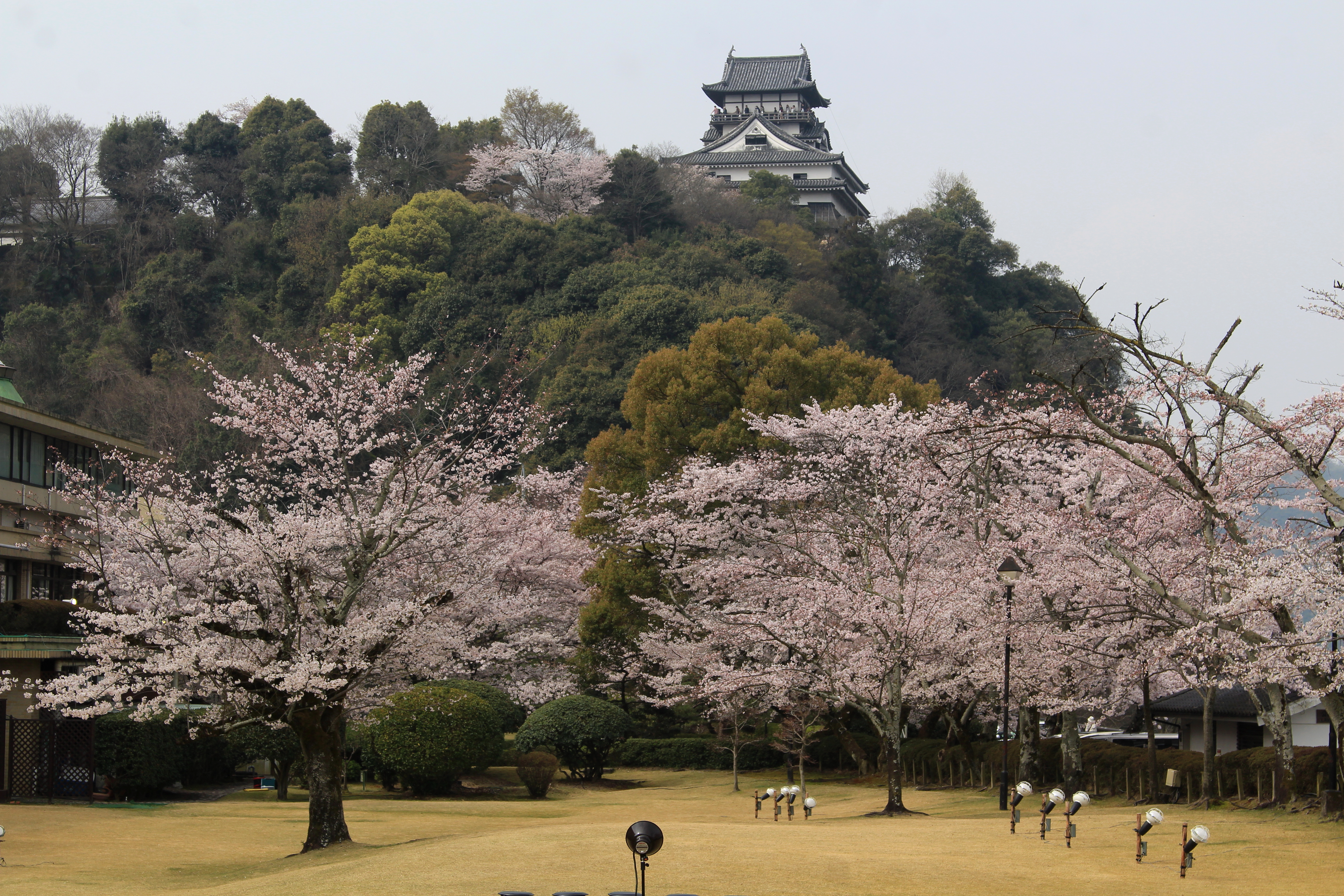
Inuyama Castle Keep Tower and Cherry Tree in Inuyama, Aichi prefecture, Japan.

Prunus × yedoensis is a small, deciduous tree that grows to be 5 to 12 meters (16–39 ft) (rarely 15 meters (49 ft)) tall at maturity. It grows well in hardiness zones 5–8, and does well in full sun and moist but well-drained soil. The leaves are alternately arranged, 6 to 15 centimeters (2.4–5.9 in) long and 4 to 7 centimeters (1.6–2.8 in) broad, with a serrated margin; they are often bronze-toned when newly emerged, becoming dark green by summer.

The flowers emerge before the leaves in early spring; they are fragrant, 3 to 3.5 centimeters (1.2–1.4 in) in diameter, with five white or pale pink petals. The flowers grow in clusters of five or six together.

The fruit, a small cherry, is a globose drupe 8 to 10 millimeters (0.31–0.39 in) in diameter; they are an important source of food for many small birds and mammals, including robins and thrushes. Although the fruit contain little flesh, it contains much concentrated red juice which can stain clothing and bricks. The fruit is only marginally sweet to the human palate.

== Cultivation ==
With its fragrant, light pink flowers, manageable size, and elegant shape, the Yoshino cherry is often used as an ornamental tree. Many cultivars have been selected; notable examples include 'Akebono' (or 'America' in Japan), 'Ivensii', and 'Shidare Yoshino'.

From the Edo period to the beginning of the Meiji period, gardeners and craftsman who made the village at Somei in Edo (now Komagome, Toshima ward, Tokyo) grew someiyoshino. They first offered them as Yoshinozakura, but in 1900, they were renamed someiyoshino by Dr. Fujino. This is sometimes rendered as 'Somei-Yoshino'.

The Yoshino cherry was introduced to Europe and North America in 1902. The National Cherry Blossom Festival is a spring celebration in Washington, D.C., commemorating the 1912 gift of Japanese cherry trees from Tokyo to the city of Washington. They are planted in the Tidal Basin park. Several of 2,000 Japanese cherry trees given to the citizens of Toronto by the citizens of Tokyo in 1959 were planted in High Park. Pilgrim Hill in New York City's Central Park is popular for its groves of pale flowering Yoshino cherry trees as they burst into bloom in the spring.

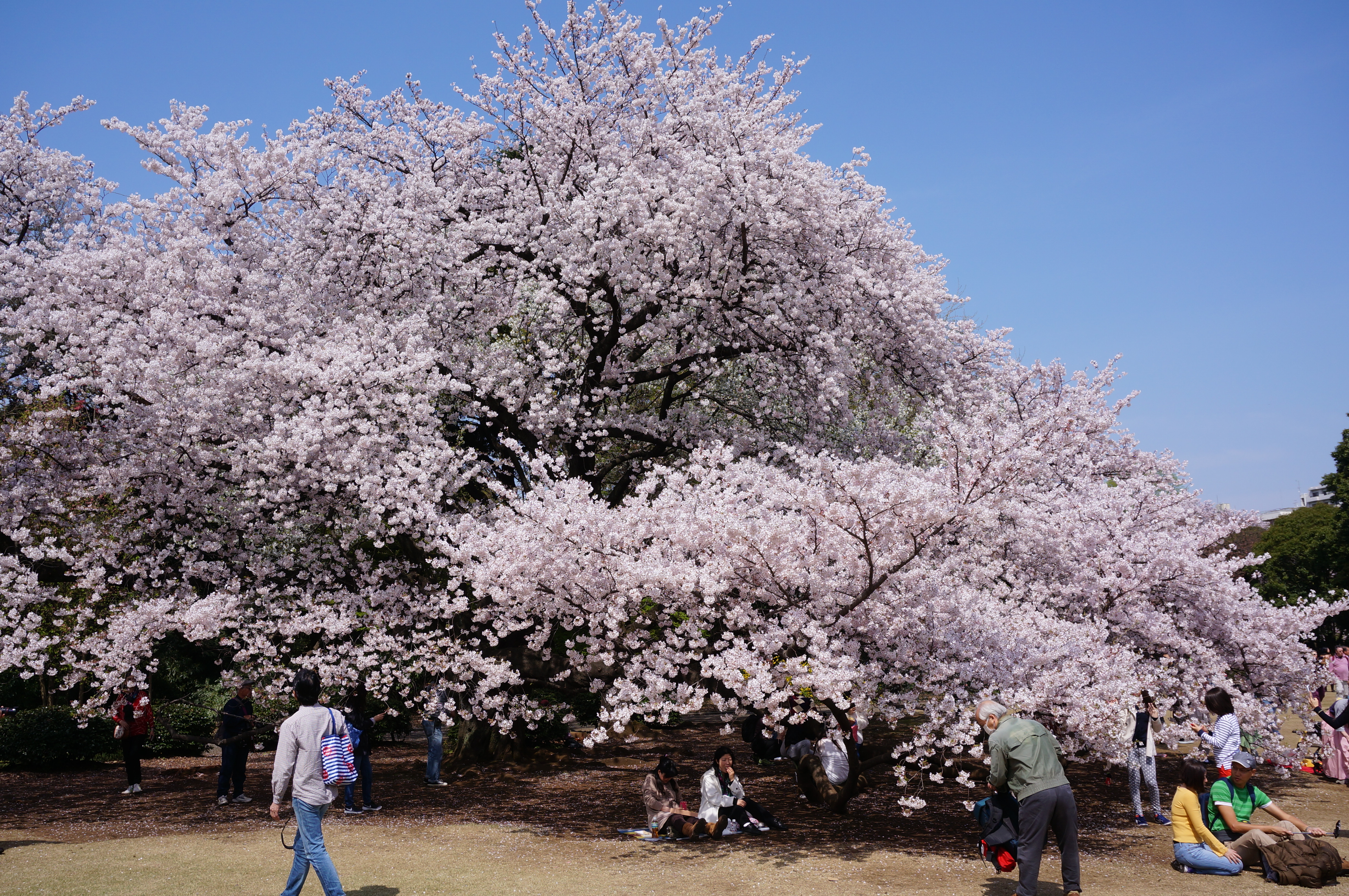
Yoshino cherry in Shinjuku Gyo-en

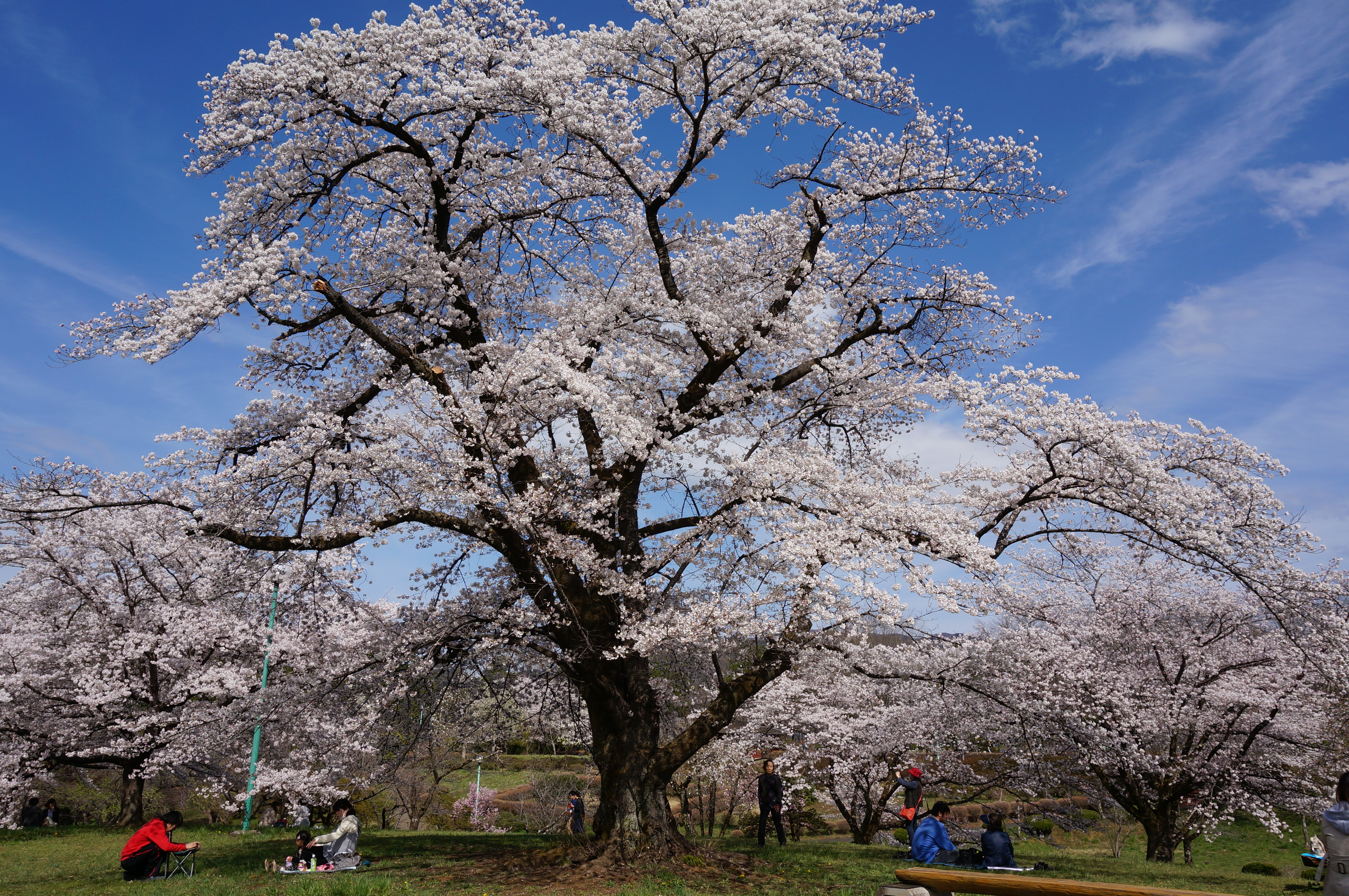
Yoshino cherry in Hitsujiyama park, Chichibu, Saitama

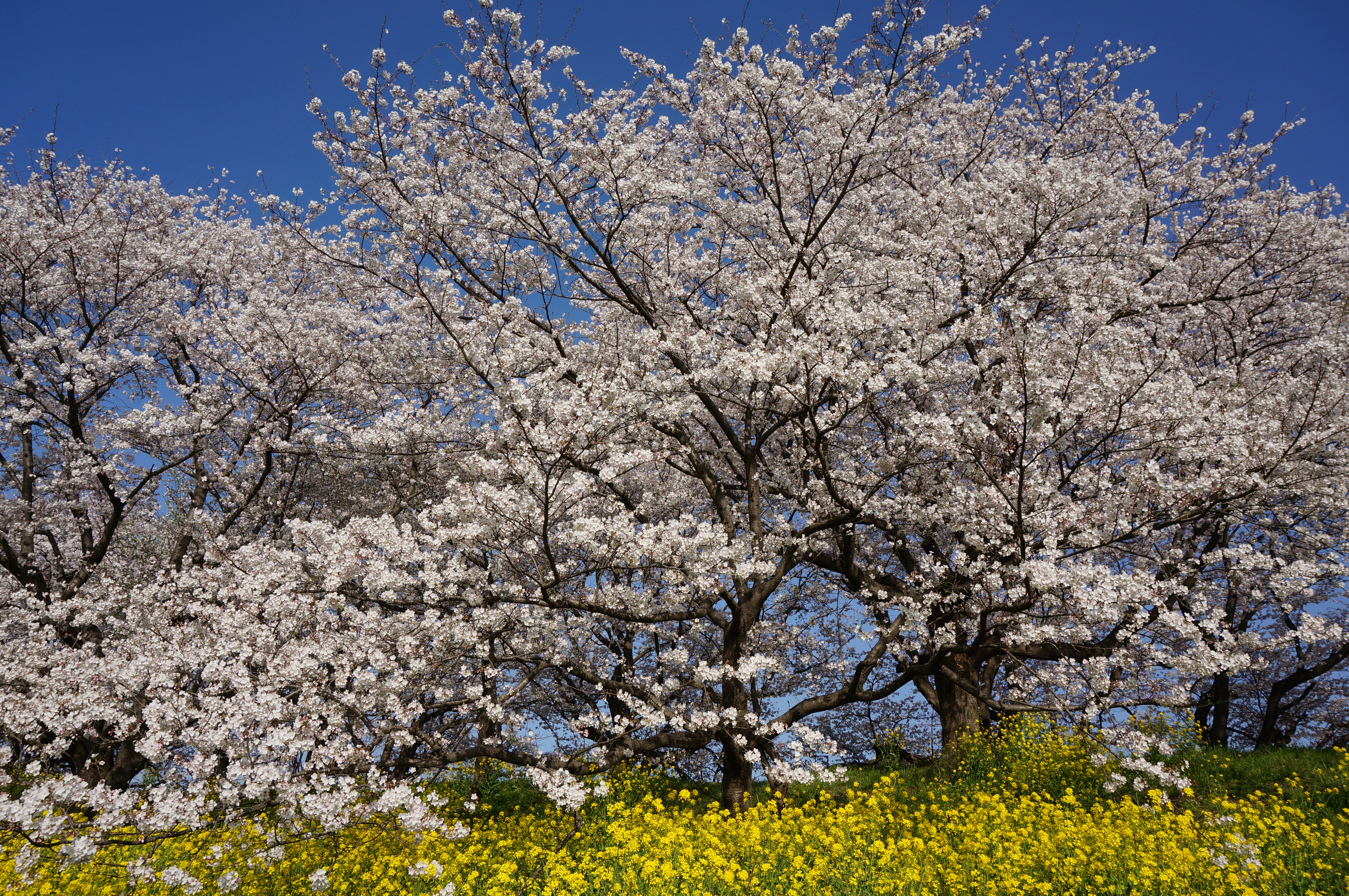
Yoshino cherry in Yoshimi, Saitama

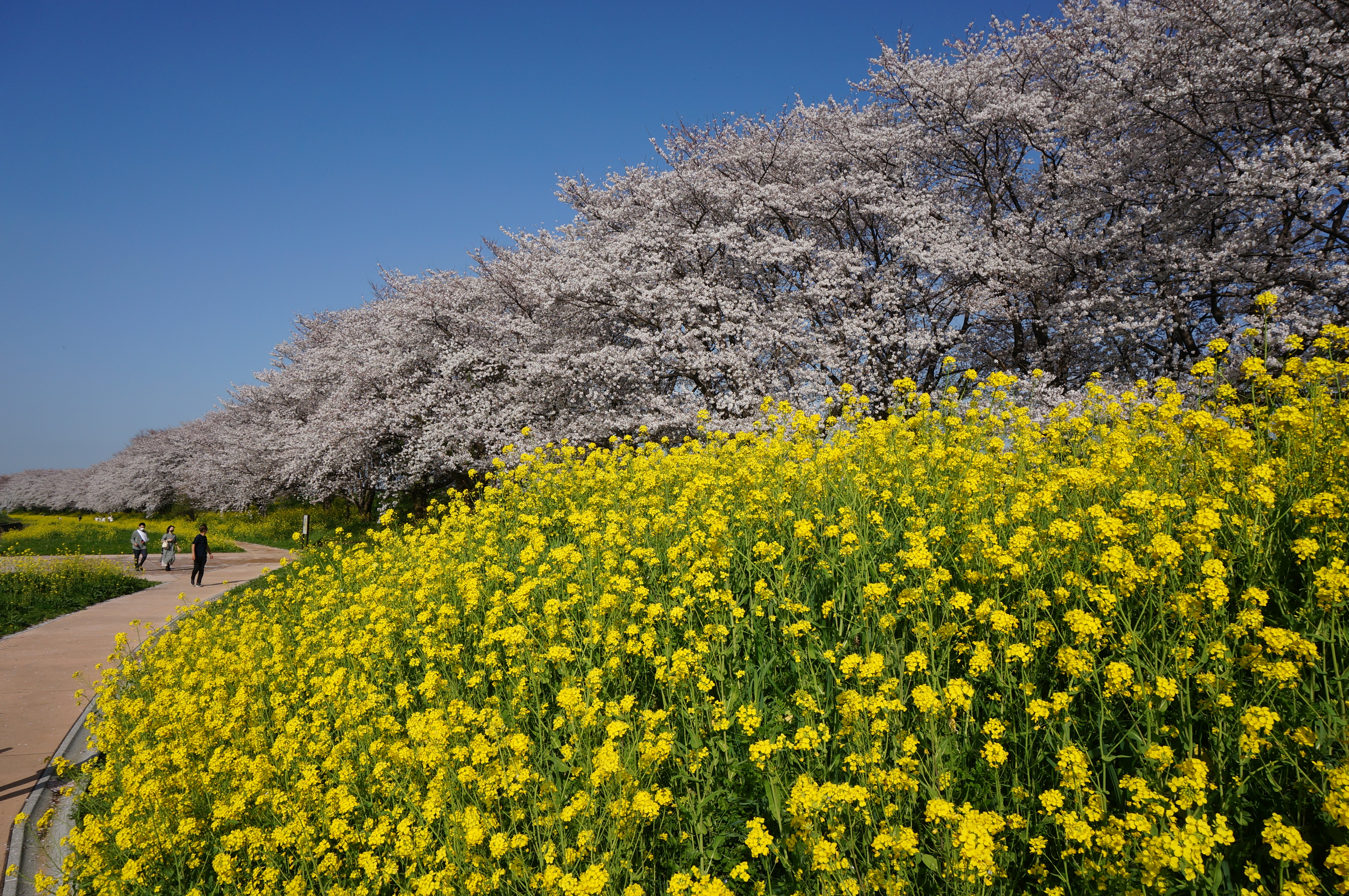
Yoshino cherry

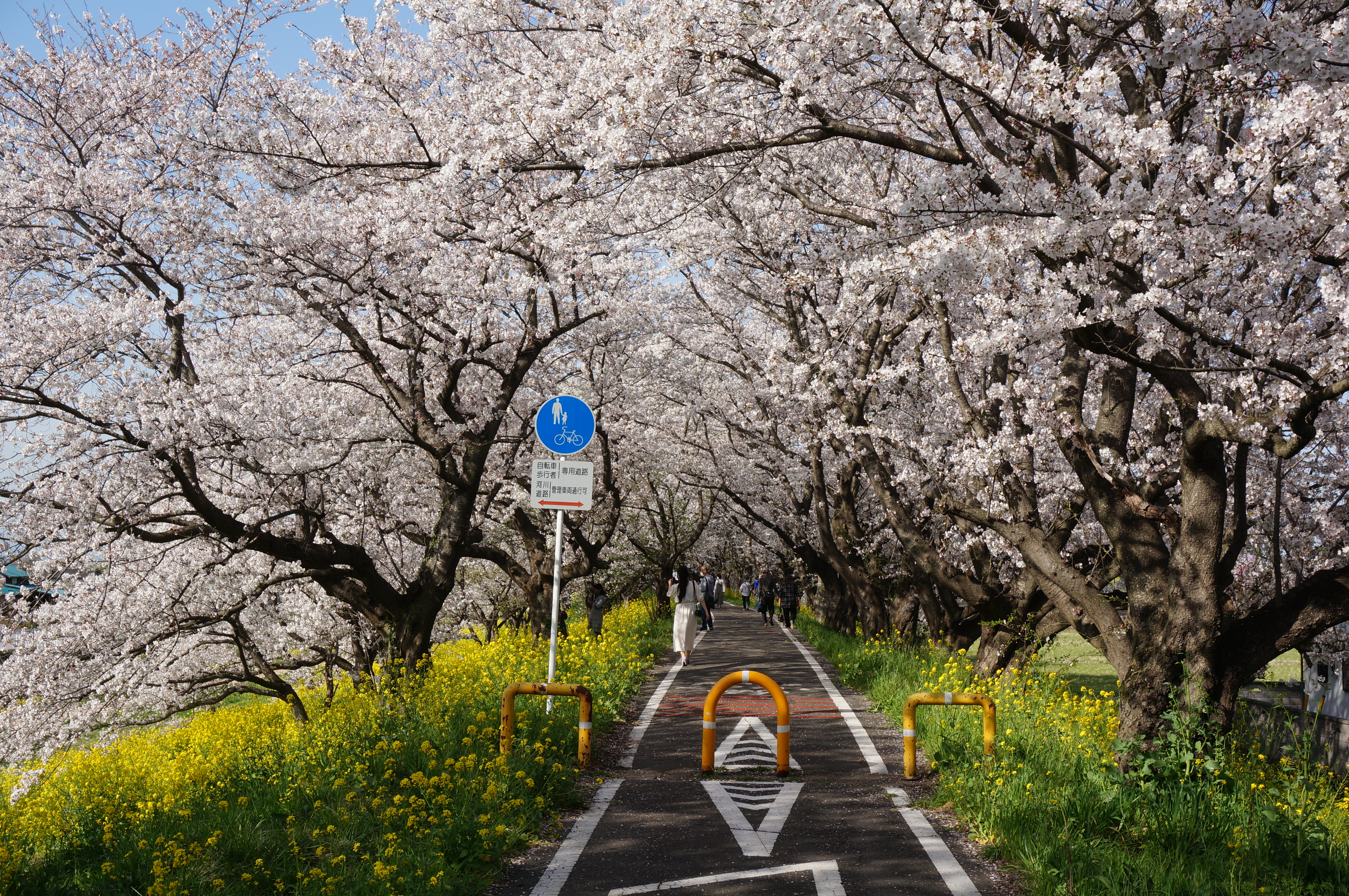
Yoshino cherry

== Parental species ==
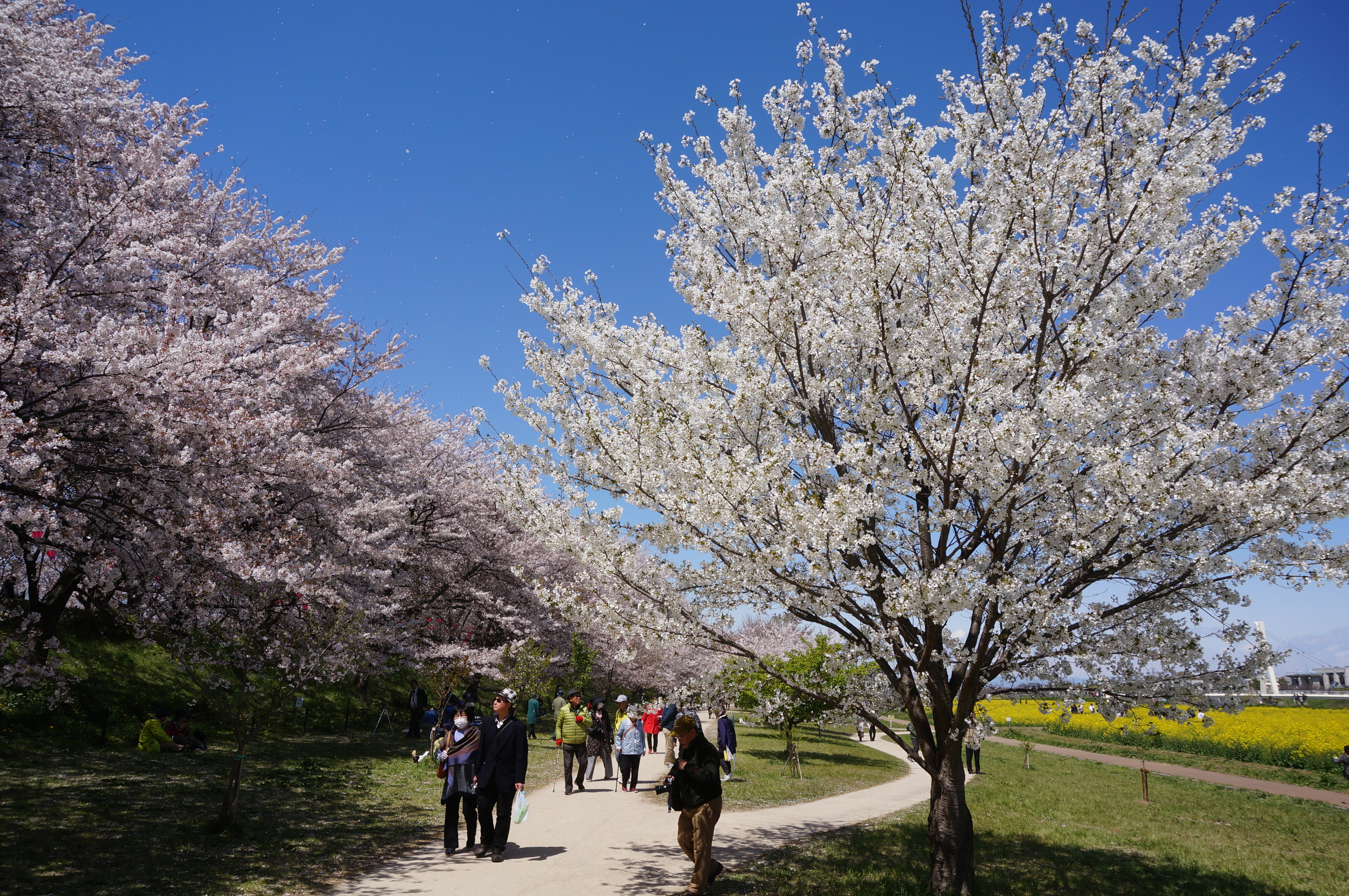
Prunus speciosa (Oshima cherry) is a paternal species of Yoshino cherry. Yoshino cherry（left）and Oshima cherry.（right）

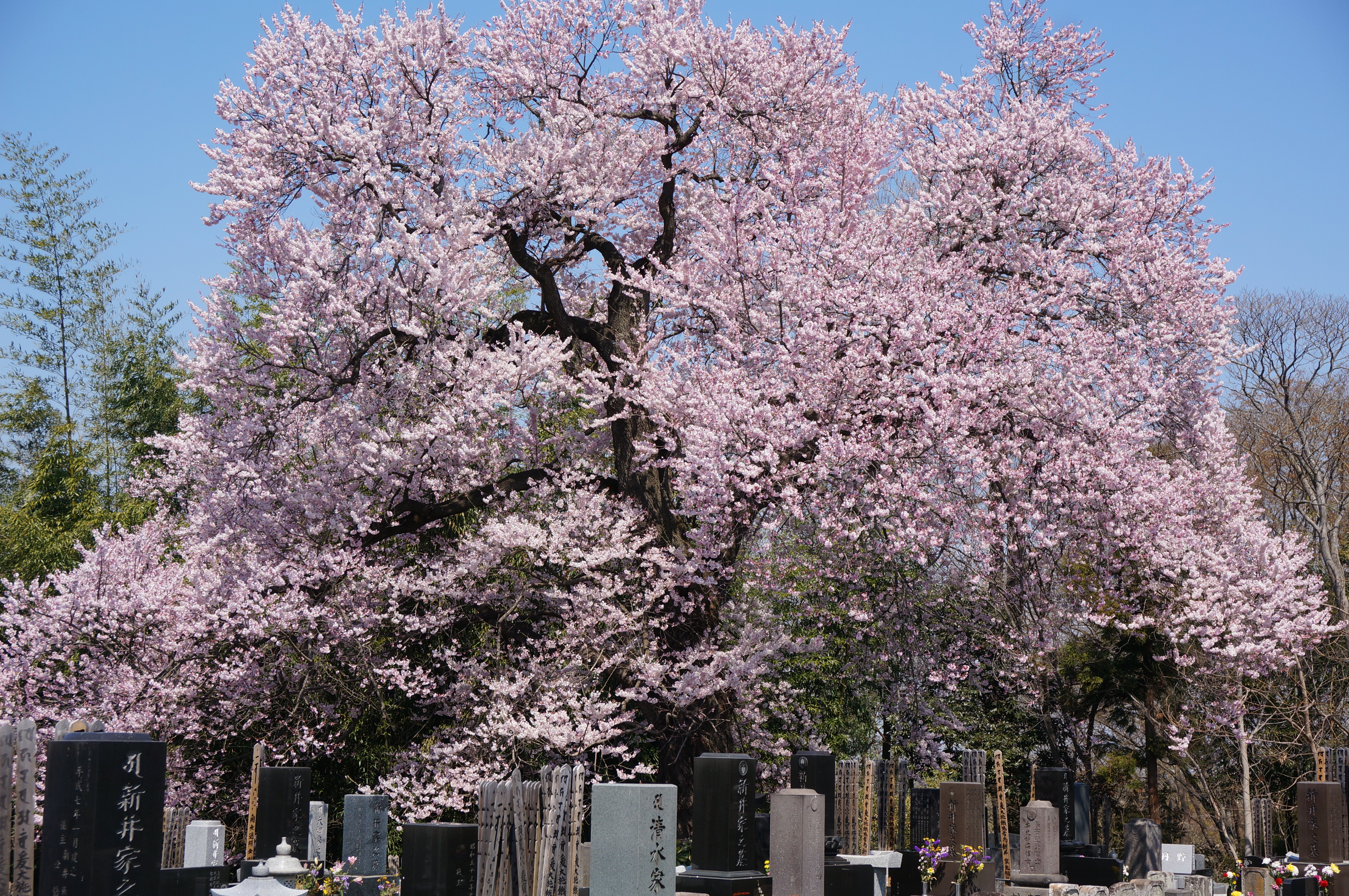
Prunus pendula f. ascendens (syn, Prunus itosakura, Prunus subhirtella var. ascendens, Edo higan) is a maternal species of Yoshino cherry.

Most studies show that Yoshino cherry ('Somei-yoshino') is a hybrid between Prunus speciosa (Oshima cherry) and Prunus pendula f. ascendens. (syn. Prunus itosakura, Prunus subhirtella var. ascendens, Edo higan).

- In 1916, Ernest Henry Wilson concluded that Yoshino cherry strongly suggests a hybrid between Prunus subhirtella var. ascendens Wilson (Edo higan) and Prunus lannesiana Wilson (Oshima cherry). It has many characters of the latter and in its venation, pubescence and shape of the cupula resembles the former
- In 1963, Takenaka assumed that Yoshino cherry is a hybrid between Prunus lannesiana var. speciose (Oshima cherry) and Prunus subhirtella var. pendula form ascendens (Edo higan).
- In 1986, Takafumi Kaneko et al. carried out restriction endonuclease analysis on chloroplast ctDNA. Yoshino cherry showed no interplant variation of ctDNA and had the same ctDNA as P. pendula (Edo higan), differing from P. lannesiana (Oshima cherry) by a single HindIII restriction site. This findings suggests that P. pendula is female parent of P. yedoensis.
- In 1995, Hideki Innan et al. conducted DNA fingerprinting study using different kinds of probes, M13 repeat sequence and (GACA)_{4} synthetic oligonucleotide and concluded that Yoshino cherry was produced only once through hybridization between Prunus lannesiana (Oshima cherry) and Prunus pendula (Edo higan) and that this particular hybrid plant has been spread vegetatively all over Japan,
- In 2014, Shuri Kato et al. conducted molecular analysis using nuclear simple sequence repeat (SSR) polymorphisms to trace cultivar origins and Bayesian clustering based on the STRUCTURE analysis using SSR genotypes revealed that Yoshino cherry is a hybrid between Prunus pendula f. ascendens (Edo higan) and Prunus lannesiana var. speciosa (Oshima cherry) although there was also a small and nonsignificant association with Prunus jamasakura. The proportion of each species is Edo higan 47%, Oshima cherry 37%, and jamasakura 11%.
- In 2015, Ikuo Nakamura et al. analyzed sequences of intron 19 and exon 20 of PolA1. One of two exon 20 sequences found in Yoshino cherry was the same as that of P. pendula (Edo higan), whereas the other sequence was shared with several taxa in seven wild species, including P. jamasakura (Yamazakura) and P. lannesiana (Oshima cherry). Yoshino cherry contained two different haplotypes of the intron 19 sequences; one was the same as that of Oshima cherry. While another haplotype of Yoshino cherry was different from that of Edo higan by two SNPs but identical to one of two haplotypes of P. pendula ‘Komatsuotome,’ which is a cultivar of Edo higan. These results indicated that Yoshino cherry probably originated by the hybridization of cultivars derived from Edo higan and Oshima cherry.

== Origin debates ==
- In 1908, a French missionary Taquet discovered a native cherry in Jeju islands, Korea and in 1912 a German botanist Koehne gave it a scientific name Prunus yedoensis var. nudiflora. Although this species called Eishu zakura is a variation of Yoshino cherry ('Somei-yoshino'), from then it was misrepresented that Yoshino cherry was growing naturally in Jeju Island.
- In 1933, the Japanese botanist Gen'ichi Koizumi reported that Yoshino cherry originated on Jeju island, South Korea. Koreans claimed that the Japanese stole Yoshino cherry from South Korea at the time of Japanese annexation of Korea.
- In 1962, Yo Takenaka ruled out the possibility of Korean origin by the morphological study.
- In 1995 DNA fingerprinting technology was used to conclude that Yoshino cherry grown in many parts of Japan under the name Prunus × yedoensis is indeed clonally propagated from the same hybrid offspring of Prunus lannesiana (Oshima cherry) and Prunus pendula (Edo higan), which confirms the 1991 conclusion given by Iwasaki Fumio that Prunus × yedoensis originated around 1720–1735 by artificial crossing of these species in Edo (Tokyo). Oshima cherry is an endemic species found only around Izu Islands, Izu and Bōsō Peninsulas not around Korean Peninsula.
- In 2007, a study conducted on the comparison of Japanese Yoshino cherry and Korean King cherry concluded that the trees native to these two places can be categorized as distinct species. It was confirmed that South Korea's claim was false.
- In 2016, the phylogenetic analysis of nrDNA ITS data and the cpDNA haplotype network analysis suggested that independent origin between King cherry and yoshino cherry, respectively.
- In 2016, a new scientific name Cerasus × nudiflora was given to King cherry to distinguish it from Yoshino cherry (Prunus × yedoensis).

== Other cultivars ==
Prunus × yedoensis has many cultivars other than 'Somei-yoshino' (Yoshino cherry).

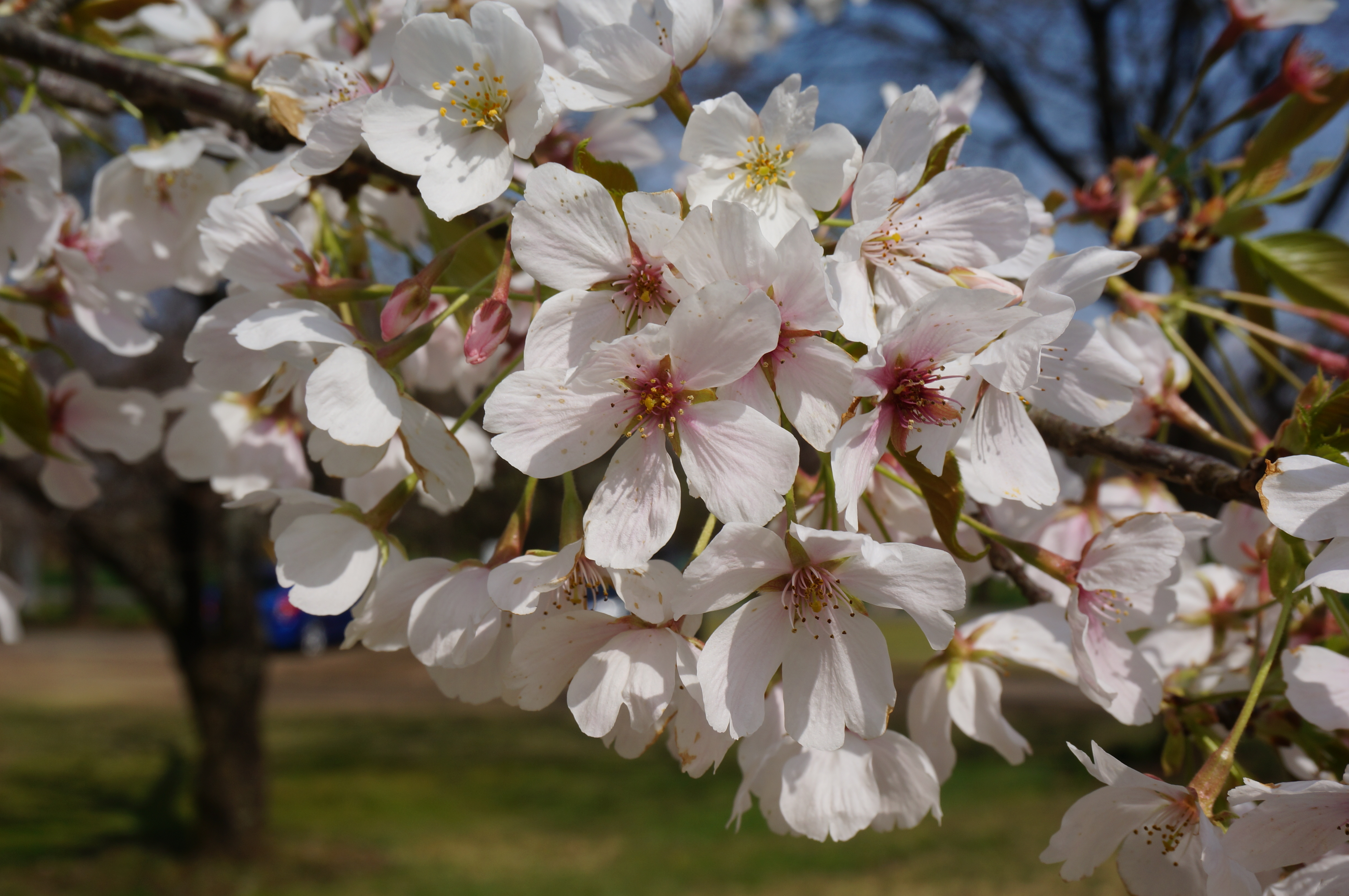
'Mikado-yoshino'. (御帝吉野) It is a cultivar developed by Yō Takenaka in the course of research investigating the origin of 'Somei-yoshino' and has larger petals than 'Somei-yoshino'.

- ‘Amagi-yoshino’ (天城吉野)
- ‘America’ (アメリカ) (or 'Akebono' in the U.S.)
- ‘Candida’ (薄毛大島, Usuge-oshima)
- ‘Funabara-yoshino’ (船原吉野)
- ‘Hayazaki-oshima’ (早咲大島)
- ‘Izu-yoshino’ (伊豆吉野)
- ‘Kichijouji’ (吉祥寺)
- ‘Kurama-zakura’ (鞍馬桜)
- ‘Mikado-yoshino’ (御帝吉野)
- ‘Mishima-zakura’ (三島桜)
- ‘Morioka-pendula’ (盛岡枝垂, Morioka-shidare)
- ‘Naniwa-zakura’ (浪速桜)
- ‘Pendula’ (枝垂大臭桜), Shidare-ookusai-zakura
- ‘Perpendens’ (枝垂染井吉野, Shidare-somei-yoshino)
- ‘Pilosa’ (毛大島桜, Ke-oshima-zakura)
- ‘Sakabai’ (仙台吉野, Sendai-yoshino)
- ‘Sakuyahime’ (咲耶姫)
- ‘Sasabe-zakura’ (笹部桜)
- ‘Shouwa-zakura’ (昭和桜)
- ‘Somei-higan’ (染井彼岸)
- ‘Somei-nioi’ (染井匂)
- ‘Sotorihime’ (衣通姫)
- ‘Suruga-zakura’ (駿河桜)
- ‘Syuzenzi-zakura’ (修善寺桜)
- ‘Waseyoshino’ (早生吉野)
- ‘Somei-beni’ (染井紅)

== See also ==
- Cherry blossom (sakura)
