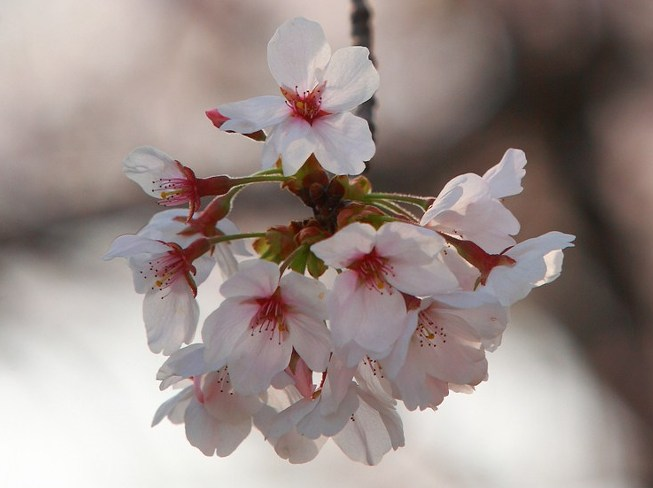

Scientific classification
- Kingdom: Plantae
- Clade: Tracheophytes
- Clade: Angiosperms
- Clade: Eudicots
- Clade: Rosids
- Order: Rosales
- Family: Rosaceae
- Genus: Prunus
- Subgenus: Prunus subg. Cerasus
- Species: P. × nudiflora

Binomial name
- Prunus × nudiflora (Koehne) Koidz.

Synonyms
- Cerasus × nudiflora (Koehne) T.Katsuki & Iketani; Prunus × yedoensis var. nudiflora Koehne

= Prunus × nudiflora =

Hybrid species of tree

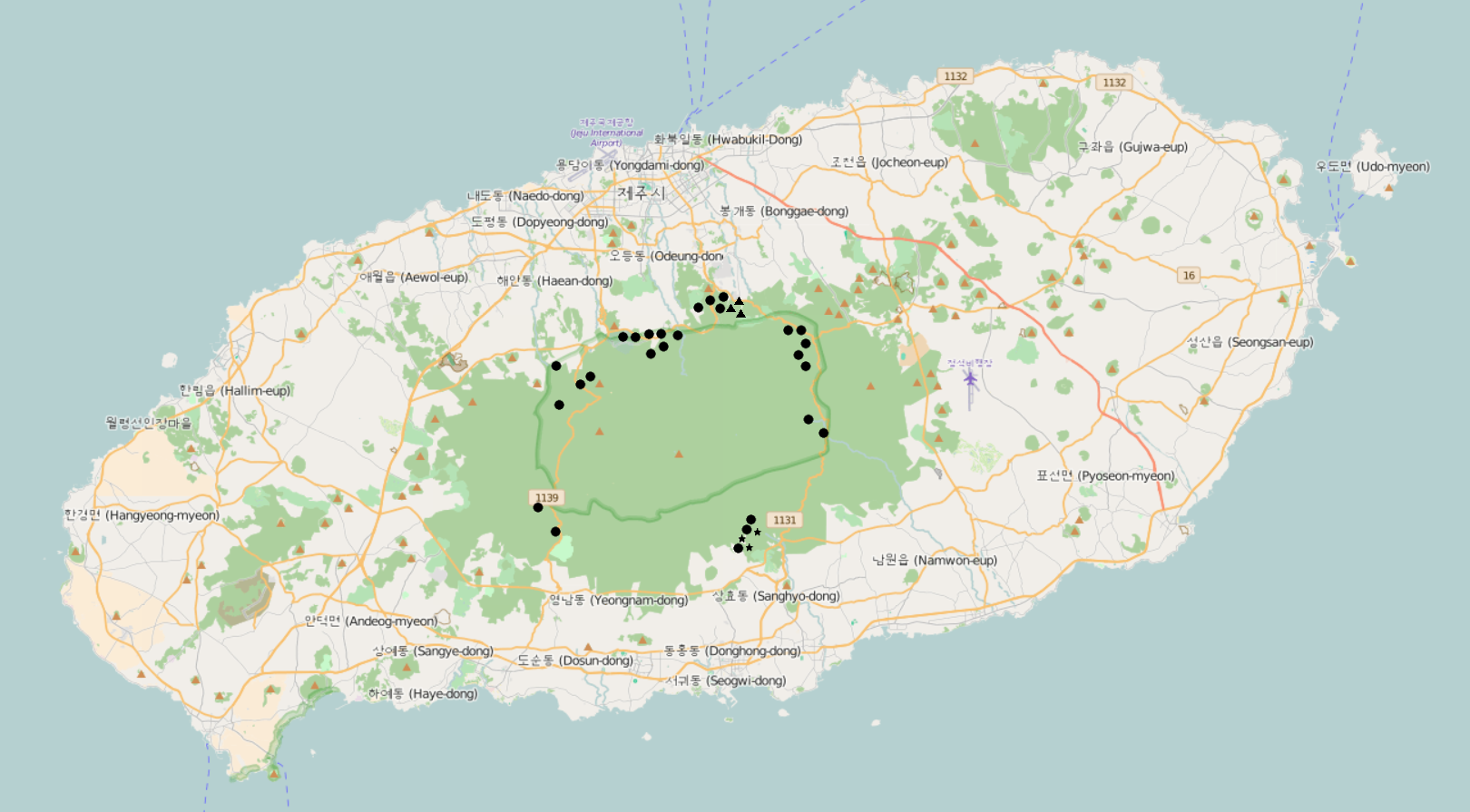
Distribution of 33 king cherry trees in Mt. Halla in Jeju Island in 1998. ★ and ▲ represent Natural Monument No. 156 and No. 159 respectively.

Prunus × nudiflora (king cherry, 왕벚 wangbeot, 왕벚나무 wangbeonnamu or 왕벚꽃 wangbeotkkot) is a Korean native cherry tree originating from Jeju Island. It is a distinct species from Japanese native Yoshino cherry. King cherry is a rare plant and listed as an endangered species. As of April 2017, 194 king cherry trees were growing around Mt. Halla in Jeju Island. According to Gen-ichi Koidzumi, king cherry is erroneously believed to be discovered by a French missionary Émile Joseph Taquet although what he discovered was a different species.

There have been disputes over the origin of king cherry and Yoshino cherry. Both are suspected hybrids, with doubts about the parent species. In 2007, a study conducted on the comparison of king cherry and Yoshino cherry concluded that these trees were categorized as distinct species. However, South Korean media assert that king cherry is the same species as Yoshino cherry. In Korea most of the places for cherry blossom festivals, including Yeouido and Jinhae, are still planted with Japanese Yoshino cherry trees.

== Name ==
In 1901, Yoshino cherry was given a scientific name Prunus yedoensis by Jinzō Matsumura after its place of origin Yedo (current day Tokyo). In the early 1900s, king cherry was thought to be the same species as Yoshino cherry, it is called Prunus yedoensis, the same scientific name as Yoshino cherry. After Ernest Henry Wilson suggested Yoshino cherry is a hybrid between Prunus subhirtella var. ascendens (Edo higan) and Prunus lannesiana (Oshima zakura) in 1916, Yoshino cherry came to be called Prunus × yedoensis. However king cherry still remained to be called Prunus yedoensis which is originally given to Yoshino cherry. In 2016, Katsuki et al. proposed a new name Cerasus × nudiflora after king cherry was found to be a hybrid by Cho in 2014 and shown to be genetically distinct from Prunus × yedoensis.

The Korean name wangbeonnamu (왕벚나무, king cherry) was created in 1963 when the Korean official plant resource survey team found three trees, until then it was called sakuranamu (사쿠라나무, sakura) or teolbeonnamu (털벚나무, hairy cherry). Wangbeonnamu means "king cherry tree" while wangbeotkkot means "king cherry blossom". The Korean name wangbeonnamu or wangbeotkkot does not distinguish Yoshino cherry from king cherry because they have been thought to be the same species. If necessary, Yoshino cherry is referred to as someiyosino (소메이요시노), a transliteration of a Japanese name for Yoshino cherry.

== Characteristics ==
King cherry is quite rare in number in its habitat. In 1908, a single tree was discovered in the north slope of Mt. Halla near Gwaneumsa Temple by Taquet although according to Koidzumi it was a different species. In 1932, Koidzumi discovered a single tree in the south slope of Mt.Halla. In 1962, the first Korean official plant resource survey team was established and found three trees. Next year in 1963, the team found another three trees. In 1965, Han Chang-yeol reported that wild cherry trees which grow in Mt. Halla in Jeju Island are mostly Prunus subhirtella var. pendula form. ascendens (Edo higan) and Prunus donarium (Yamazakura) and king cherry is rare in number, around 10 individuals, having been found in a half century. ^{[Note 2]} In 1998, Kim Chan-soo reported that 33 king cherry trees were found around Mt. Halla. From March 2015 to October 2016, Warm-Temperate and Subtropical Forest Research Center, Korea Forest Research Institute conducted a survey of king cherry on Mt. Halla. The center found 194 king cherry trees are growing in 173 locations. The trees are located at altitudes between 165 m and 853 m. The trees range 5–19 m in height, 15–145 cm in diameter and 15–265 year old.

King cherry is morphologically similar to Yoshino cherry. When Yo Takenaka went to the Jeju Island in 1933, he observed that the king cherry's hairs on calyx lobes and on the lower side of leaves were less numerous, and the peduncles were shorter. In 1998, Chan-soo Kim studied the morphological variation on 18 characters in flowers, leaves, fruits, and seeds. Most characters of king cherry were smaller in size than those of Yoshino cherry although the limits of variation of the characters were somewhat wide in king cherry. The most prominent difference is that the calyx tube of Yoshino cherry is cup-shaped, whereas it is wedge-shaped in king cherry, in addition, the inflorescences of Yoshino cherry are corymbose while those of king cherry are umbelliferous.

== History ==
- In 1908, a French missionary Taquet discovered a native cherry in Jeju islands.
- In 1912, a German botanist Koehne gave it a scientific name of Prunus yedoensis var. nudiflora as it deserves to be a separate variety from Yoshino cherry according to the variations observed.^{[Note 1]} Although this species called Eishu zakura is a variation of Yoshino cherry, from then it was misrepresented that Yoshino cherry was growing naturally in Jeju Island.
- In 1916, Ernest Henry Wilson examined a specimen of King Cherry. He wrote "As far as I could judge it is undoubtedly a state of P. yedoensis Matsumura, ... To me the evidence is inconclusive, and I do not think the last word on the origin or native country of P. yedoensis Matsumura has yet been heard."
- In 1932, Koidzumi discovered that Yoshino cherry (currently identified as king cherry) along with the cherry which was found by Taquet were growing naturally and reported that Yoshino cherry is originated on Jeju island. Also Koidzumi identified that Prunus yedoensis var. nudiflora which was found by Taquet and named by Koehne is an independent species from king cherry and named it Prunus nudiflora (Koehn) Koidz. nom. nov. (Eishu zakura) which is a synonym of Prunus quelpaertensis Nakai (Tanna-yamazakura). Korea National Arboretum lists this species as Jejubeojnam (제주벚나무, Jeju cherry), a distinct species from king cherry in its Korea Biodiversity Information System.
- In 1933, Takenaka visited Jeju island and observed the tree which Koidzumi found. The tree was growing wild, showed differences from P. yedoensis; the hairs on calyx lobes and on the lower side of leaves were less numerous, and the peduncles were shorter. He concluded that it could not be P. yedoensis.
- In 1962, Takenaka ruled out the possibility of Korean origin of Yoshino Cherry by the morphological study.
- In 2005, Yong-hwan Jung et al. conducted the phylogenetic analysis using sequences from both rbcL gene and trnL-trnF intergenic spacer of chloroplast DNA and concluded that king cherry and Yoshino cherry are clearly genetically distinguished from each other.
- In 2007, Mark S. Roh et al. analyzed king cherry and Yoshino cherry with inter-simple sequence repeat (ISSR) markers and sequence analysis of two chloroplast DNA genes, rpl16 and trnL-trnF spacer and showed that king cherry can be considered indigenous and sufficiently distinct from Yoshino cherry to warrant recognition as a distinct entity. This study also confirmed that cherry trees in Washington, D.C. donated by Japan in 1912 are genetically distinct from king cherry trees despite the speculations by some Korean media.
- In 2016, Myong-suk Cho et al. conducted comparative phylogenetic analyses by generating the phylogeny (MP) and haplotype network (TCS) based on highly informative sequences of two cpDNA regions (rpl16 gene and trnS-trnG intergenic spacer). In this study, king cherry and Yoshino cherry were distinguished from each other in both the phylogeny and haplotype networks. Also it concluded that two old cherry trees in the yard of the Roman Catholic Archdiocese of Daegu which had been speculated to be king cherry transplanted from Jeju Island by Taquet are highly likely to be Yoshino cherry rather than king cherry.
- In 2016, Myong-suk Cho et al. performed the phylogenetic analysis of nrDNA ITS data and the cpDNA haplotype network analysis and suggested that independent origin between king cherry and yoshino cherry, respectively.

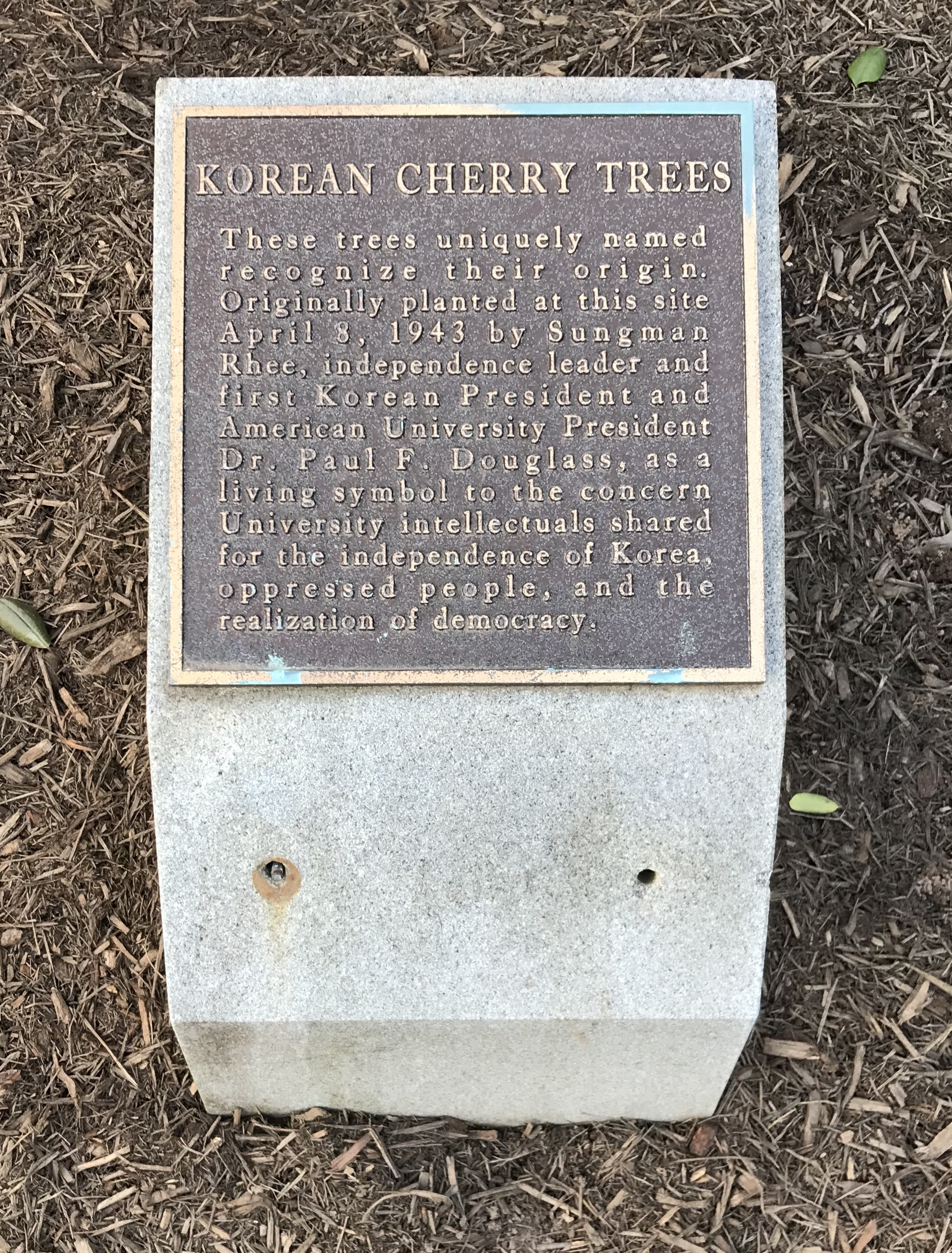
Monument of "Korean Cherry Trees" on the campus of the American University which revealed to be Japanese Yoshino cherry trees

- In 2017, Eun Ju Cheong et al. were able to distinguish two distinct groups, king cherry and Yoshino cherry, using sequence polymorphisms in eight chloroplast DNA (cpDNA) noncoding regions. This study also revealed that the three "Korean cherry trees" which had been planted on the campus of the American University by the former South Korean president Syngman Rhee in 1943 and have been believed to be king cherry were Yoshino cherry not king cherry.

== Putative parental species ==
- In 1963, Takenaka assumed that king cherry might be a hybrid between Prunus subhirtella var. pendula form ascendens (Edo higan) and Prunus quelpartensis Nakai (Tanna-yamazakura; perhaps a form of Prunus verecunda (Kasumizakura)) or some other cherry species.
- In 2014, Myong-suk Cho et al. reported that the nuclear (ITS/ETS and G3pdh) and cpDNA data, along with several morphological characteristics, provide the first convincing evidence for the hybrid origin of king cherry. The maternal parent was determined to be Prunus spachiana form ascendens (Edo higan), while the paternal parent was unresolved from the taxonomically complex Prunus serrulata (Yamazakura) / Prunus sargentii (Oyamazakura) clade.
- In 2016, Katsuki et al. proposed that king cherry have resulted from interspecific hybrid between C. itosakura (=Prunus spachiana form ascendens) and C. sargentii based on the findings by Cho in 2014 considering the possibility of hybridization from the bloom time.
- In 2017, Ara Cho et al. reported that the Sequence-level comparison of Prunus Conserved Orthologous Gene Set (Prunus COS) markers suggested that king cherry might originate from a cross between maternal P. pendula f. ascendens and paternal P. jamasakura, rather than P. sargentii.
- In 2018, Seunghoon Baek et al. analyzed the genome of king cherry using long-read sequencing and sequence phasing and found king cherry is an F1 hybrid originating from a cross between maternal P. pendula f. ascendens and paternal P. jamasakura, and it can be clearly distinguished from Yoshino cherry.
- In 2019, Myong-Suk Cho et al. using four different Rosaceae Conserved Orthologous Set (RosCOS) markers, provided evidence that king cherry originated from multiple bidirectional hybridization events between two sympatric species, P. spachiana f. ascendens as the maternal species and P. serrulata var. spontanea / P. serrulata var. quelpaertensis as the most probable paternal species.

== Cultivation ==
As of 2017, most of the cherry trees planted in South Korea are Yoshino cherry trees known to have come from Japan or have been grafted from trees planted during the Japanese colonial period. In hopes to replace these trees with Korean native king cherry trees, efforts are undertaken to propagate the excellent varieties of king cherry.

In 1996, the Timber Breeding Research Institute, former Warm-Temperate and Subtropical Forest Research Center planted 40 king cherry trees artificially bred by the tissue culturing. They bloomed in 2003 for the first time. The Warm-Temperate and Subtropical Forest Research Center has developed a conservation area of 90,000 m^{2} since 2000 and is now cultivating 3,000 king cherry trees. In April 2017, the center announced that it has developed 100,000 m^{2} of king cherry tree cultivation farm at Hannam Experimental Forest and planted 4,150 four to five year old king cherry trees. The center plans to expand the area to 250,000 m^{2} by 2022 and to cultivate a total of 20,000 king cherry trees.

== Natural monument ==

King cherry tree habitats are designated to the Natural monument. There are three Natural monuments.

- Natural monument no. 156 – Jeju Sinrye-ri King Cherry habitat, designated in 1964. 33.361222°N 126.597034°E
- Natural monument no. 159 – Jeju Bonggae-dong King Cherry habitat, designated in 1964. There are two king cherry trees. 33.468198°N 126.598824°E
- Natural monument no. 173 - Haenam Daedunsan king cherry habitat, designated in 1966: There are two king cherry trees. 34.491537°N 126.614690°E
- Jeju Province Monument No. 51 - Jeju Gwaneumsa King Cherry habitat, designated in 1999. 33.423817°N 126.558330°E

== See also ==
- Cherry blossom

== Notes ==
=== Note 1 ===
Koehne described the variation of Prunus yedoensis var. nudiflora from Yoshino cherry when he proposed a new variation Prunus yedoensis var. nudiflora.

Variation of Prunus yedoensis var. nudiflora from Yoshino cherry
Description	Prunus yedoensis var. nudiflora	Yoshino cherry
Blade of the leaves during flowering	Up to 2,5 cm long	Less than 1 cm long
Pedicels	27–35 mm long	10–19 mm long
Sepals	Above the middle one	To the top
Petals	12.5 mm long, 11 mm wide	14–15 mm long, 12 mm wide
Stamina	Up to 7.5 mm long	Up to 6.5 mm long
Style	As far as the fourth part: densely softly hairy above	Medium shaggy

=== Note 2 ===
According to Park Man-Kyu (1965), king cherry trees found until 1965 are as follows:

Year	Found by	Number of tree	Location
1908	Emile Taquet	1	Northern slope
1932	Gen-ichi Koidzumi	2 ^{*1}	Southern slope
1933	Yo Takenaka	1 ^{*2}	Southern slope
1962	Park Man-Kyu and seven others	3	Southern slope
1963	Park Man-Kyu and three others	3	Southern slope
1964	Bu Jong-hyu	1	Northern slope
1964	Park Man-Kyu and three others	3	Northern slope
Total		14	

^{*1}According to Koidzumi, he found a king cherry and an Eishu zakura (Prunus yedoensis var. nudiflora) not two king cherry trees.

^{*2}According to Takenaka, the tree he observed was the same tree Koidzumi found.
