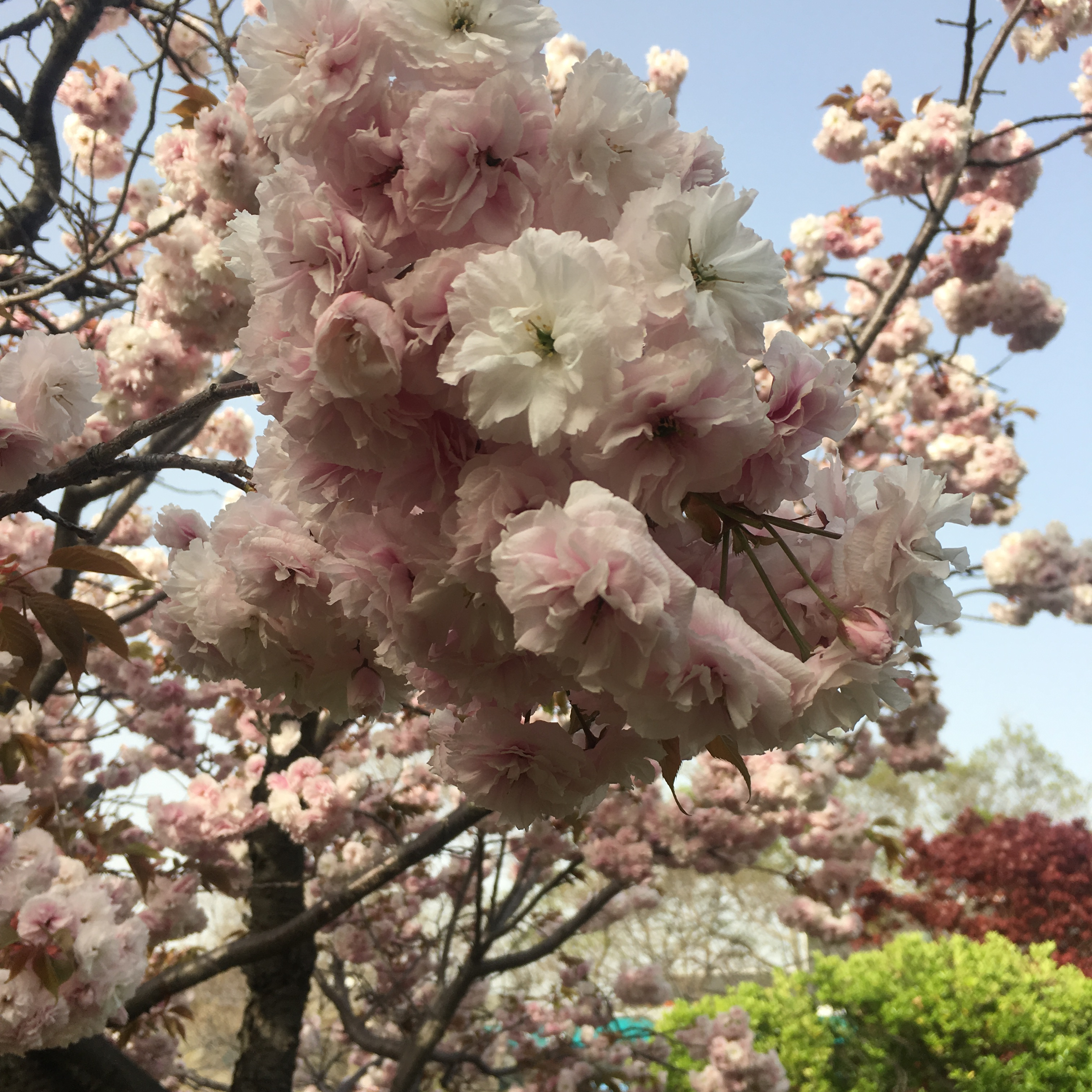
- Donarium cherry in UN memorial cemetery in Busan, South Korea.

Scientific classification
- Kingdom: Plantae
- Clade: Tracheophytes
- Clade: Angiosperms
- Clade: Eudicots
- Clade: Rosids
- Order: Rosales
- Family: Rosaceae
- Genus: Prunus
- Species: P. donarium

Binomial name
- Prunus donarium Siebold

= Prunus donarium =

Species of tree

Prunus donarium is a plant species in the family Rosaceae. The height is 10m. It is a breed made by breeding a mountain cherry tree in Japan. It grows well in sunny and relatively humid sandy soils. The leaves are alternate, and the appearance is an ellipse that seems to have put the egg upside down. The young leaf is reddish brown, but gradually changes green. Its length is 8 ~ 12cm and its tip is pointed.

Flowers bloom later than other cherry blossoms in May. A pink and white petal blooms with double flower. There is one stamen and one pistil, but the pistil is deformed and turns into a petal, so it can not bear fruit. The flowers become more and more dark pink, and when they reach the peak, the entire tree is tinted with pink.

It is weak against the cold and grows poorly north of the central region, also being vulnerable to insect pests and having a short life span.

== See also ==
- Cherry blossom
- King cherry
