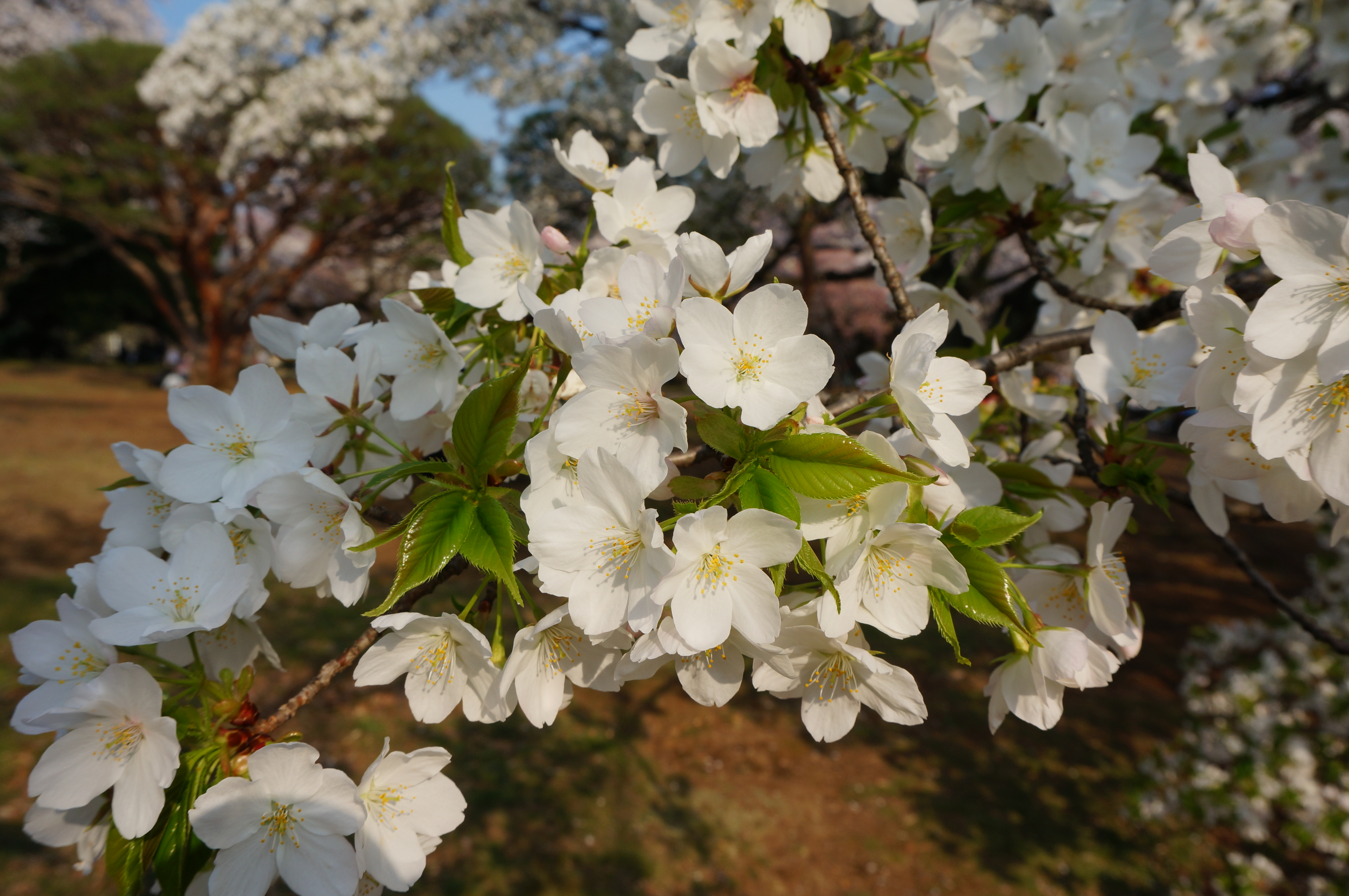

Scientific classification
- Kingdom: Plantae
- Clade: Embryophytes
- Clade: Tracheophytes
- Clade: Spermatophytes
- Clade: Angiosperms
- Clade: Eudicots
- Clade: Rosids
- Order: Rosales
- Family: Rosaceae
- Genus: Prunus
- Subgenus: Prunus subg. Cerasus
- Section: P. sect. Cerasus
- Species: P. speciosa

Binomial name
- Prunus speciosa (Koidz.) Ingram

Synonyms
- List: Cerasus speciosa (Koidz.) H.Ohba; Prunus fimbriisepala Nakai; Prunus idzuensis Nakai; Prunus occultans Nakai; Prunus speciosa (Koidz.) Nakai

= Prunus speciosa =

Species of tree

Prunus speciosa, the Oshima cherry (Japanese: オオシマザクラ, Hepburn: ōshimazakura), is a true cherry tree noted for its ornamental cherry blossoms. It is native to Izu Ōshima island and the Izu Peninsula on Honshū near Tokyo, Japan.

== Description ==
Prunus speciosa is a deciduous tree typically 4–12 metres (13–39 ft) high. The leaves are 5–10 cm long and 3–6 cm broad, with a double-toothed margin, and an acuminate apex.

The flowers are 2.5–4 cm diameter, with five white petals, gold stamens and brown sepals; they grow in clusters in the spring, and are hermaphroditic. The fruit is a small black cherry about 1 cm diameter.

A tree 8 m in circumference and 800 years old is known on Ōshima island. It has been designated a national treasure.

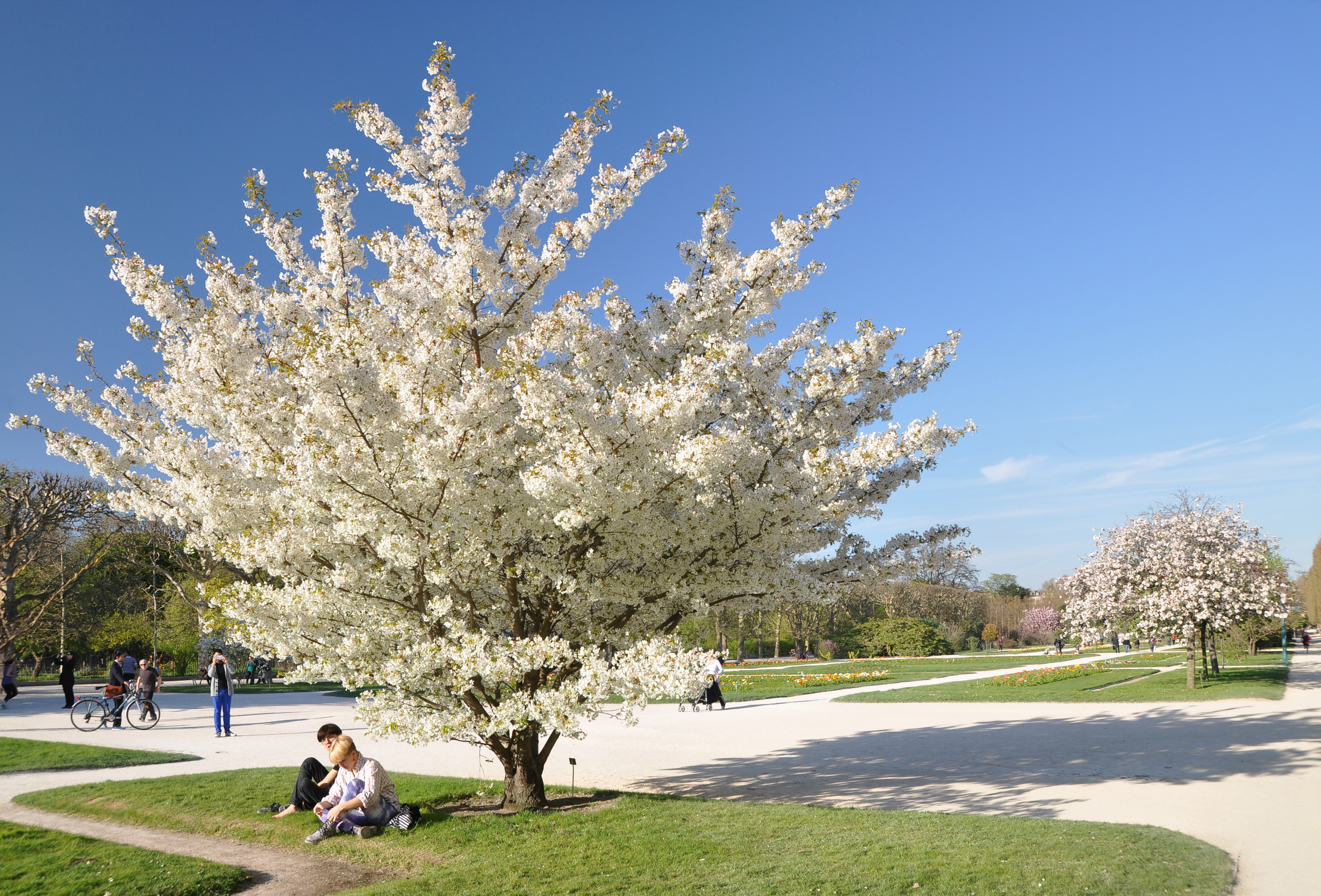
Prunus speciosa in the Jardin des Plantes of Paris April 2013.

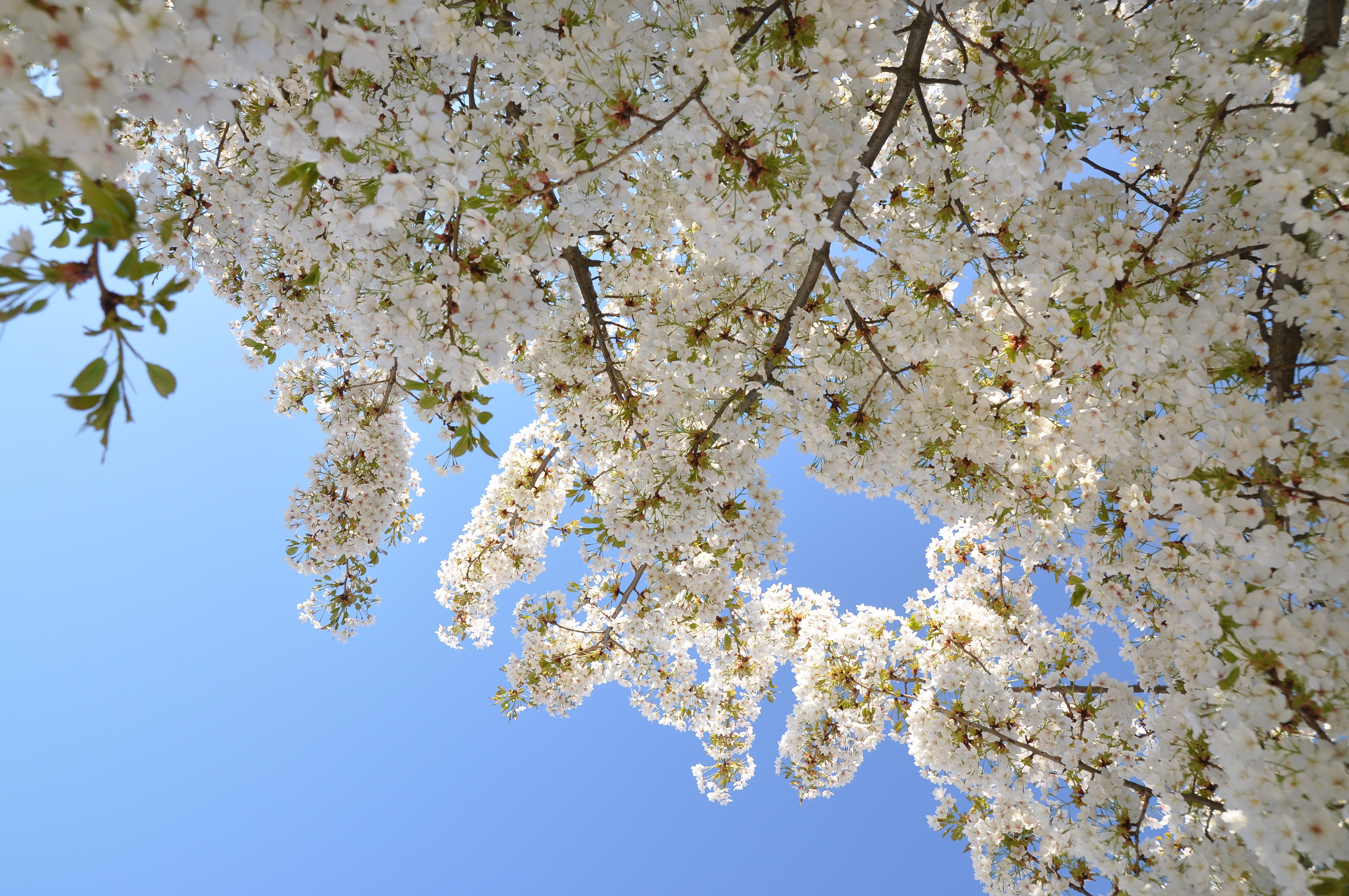
Prunus speciosa in the Jardin des Plantes of Paris April 2013.

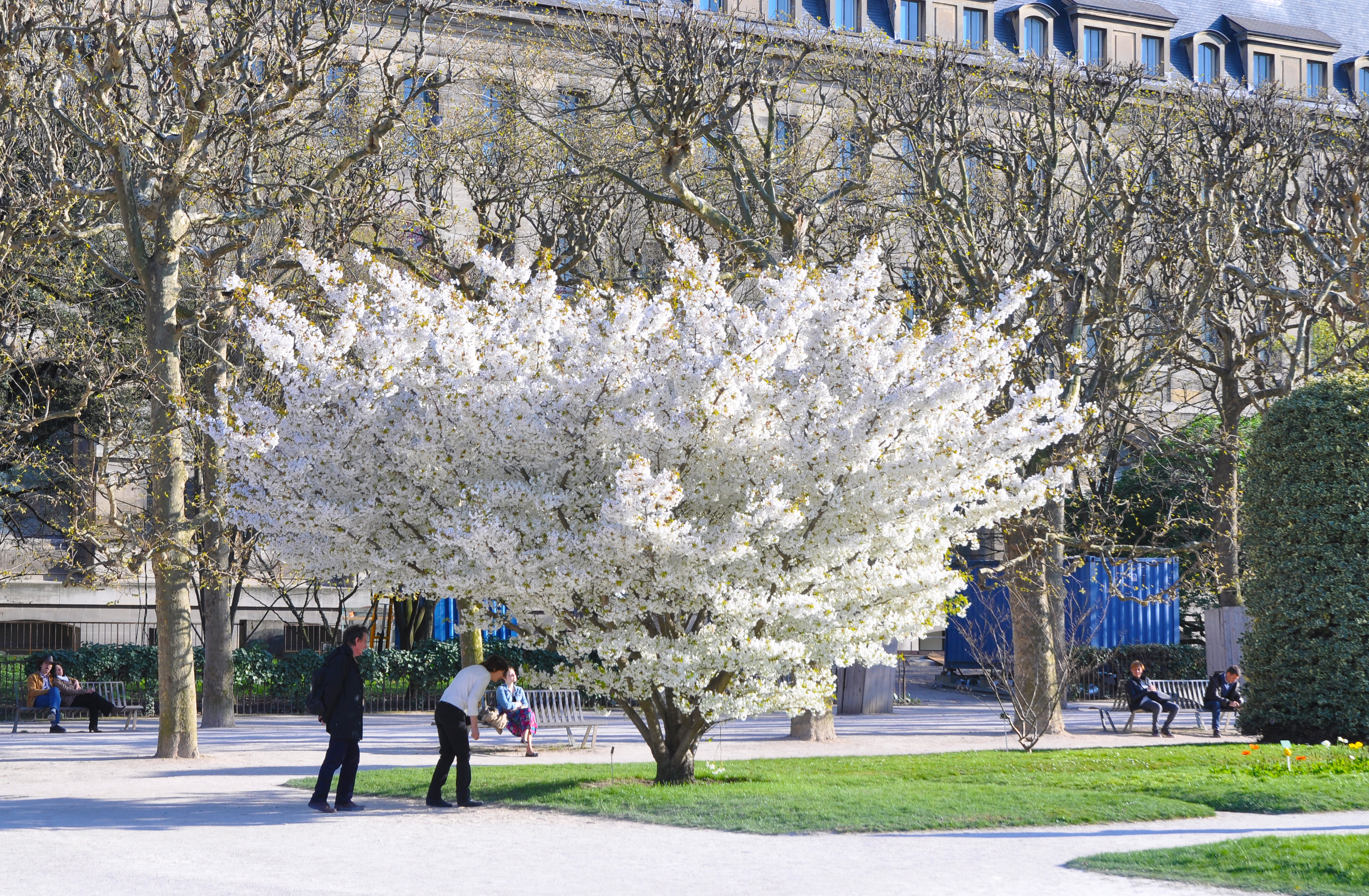
Prunus speciosa in the Jardin des Plantes de Paris April 2013.

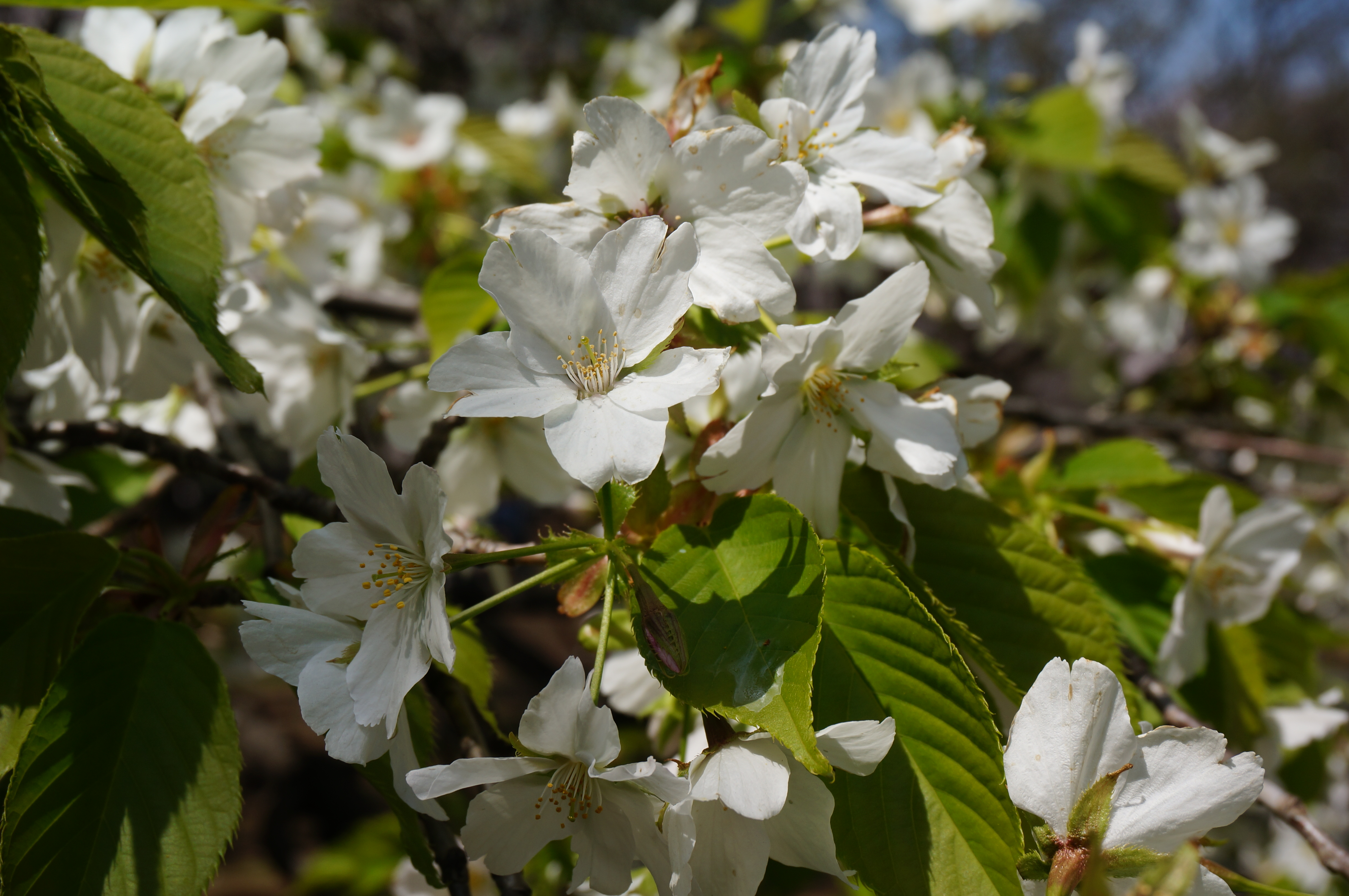
Prunus speciosa in the Shinjuku Gyoen.

== Cultivation and cultivar ==
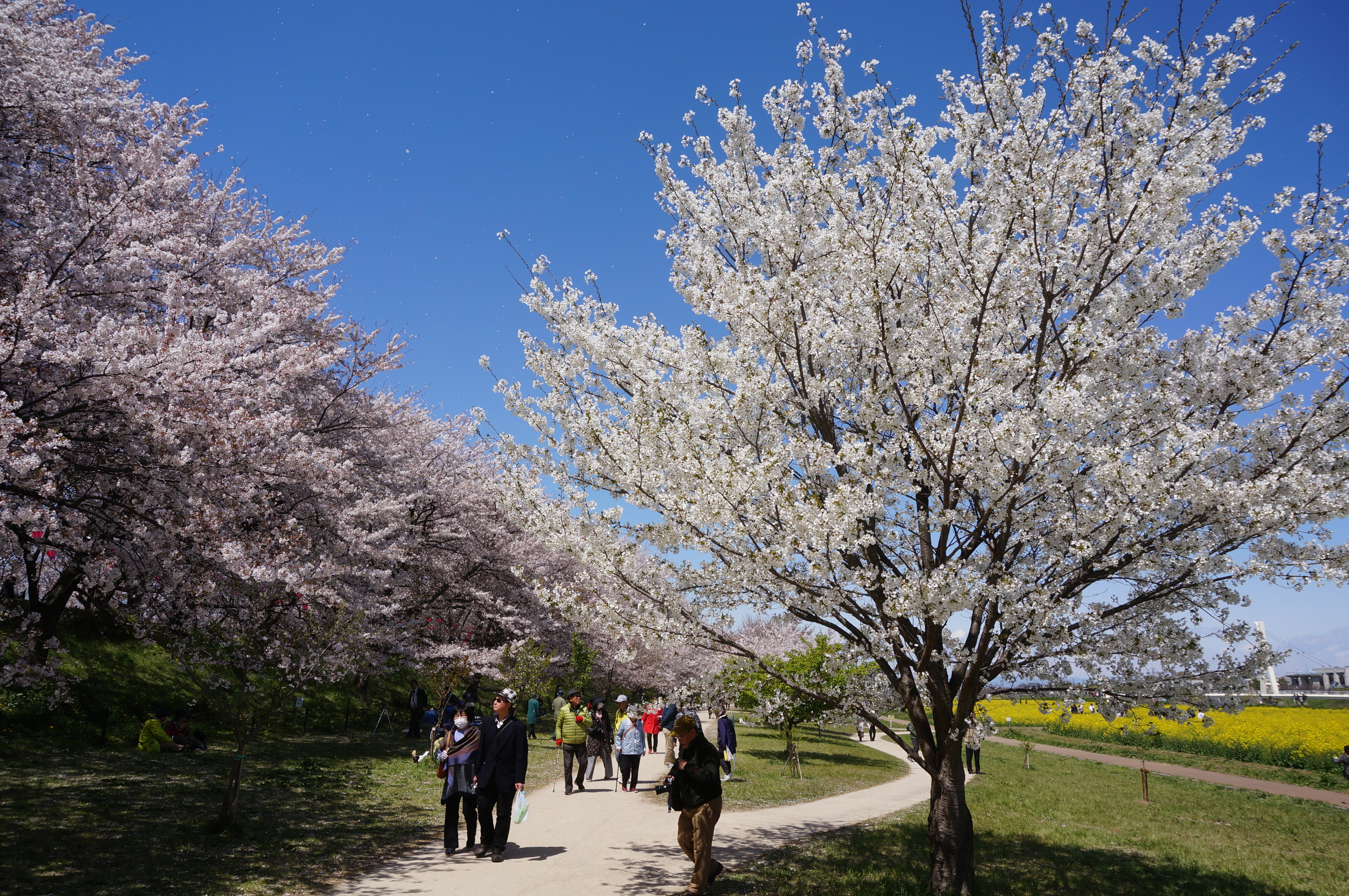
Oshima cherry is a paternal species of Yoshino cherry. Yoshino cherry (left) and Oshima cherry (right)

The Oshima cherry is widely cultivated as an ornamental tree. Because of its large, showy flowers it is planted in many gardens and parks. It prefers sun and moist but well draining soil.

There are many cultivars. It is also a hybrid parent of many of the sakura flowering cherry cultivars. Among these cultivars, those that originated from Oshima cherry are called Cerasus Sato-zakura Group, and many cultivars have a large number of petals, and the representative cultivar is Prunus lannesiana ‘Kanzan’ or ‘Sekiyama’. The reason for this is that Oshima cherry tend to mutate into double-flowered, grow fast, have many large flowers, and have a strong fragrance, so they have been favored for cherry blossom viewing because of their characteristics. When the population of the southern Kanto region increased during the medieval Kamakura period, Oshima cherry, which was originally from Izu Ōshima Island, was brought to Honshu and started to be cultivated there, and then brought to the capital, Kyoto. In the Muromachi period, Prunus lannesiana 'Albo-rosea' Makino (Fugenzou) and Prunus serrulata 'Mikurumakaisi' (Mikuruma gaeshi) derived from Oshima cherry were born, and in the Edo period, various kinds of Cerasus Sato-zakura Group such as ‘Kanzan’ were born, and many cultivars have been succeeded until now.

Oshima cherry is a paternal species of Yoshino cherry.

Food

The fruit is also edible. The flowers when dried are used to make tea. The leaves (sakura leaf or cherry leaf) are used in cooking and medicine to make 'cherry tree rice cake', but P. speciosa is not the only sakura leaf.

== Classification ==
The plant was first described by Gen'ichi Koidzumi as Prunus jamasakura var. speciosa, and later treated as a separate species by Collingwood Ingram (1880-1981). It is occasionally treated as a synonym of Prunus lannesiana. or (particularly in Japan) as a variety of it, Prunus lannesiana var. speciosa (Koidz.) Makino. The name speciosa in Latin means "the beautiful", a name which likely was applied to the blossoming tree.

== See also ==
- Cherry blossom
- Hanami
- Sakura
