= Émile Joseph Taquet =

French botanist (1873–1952)

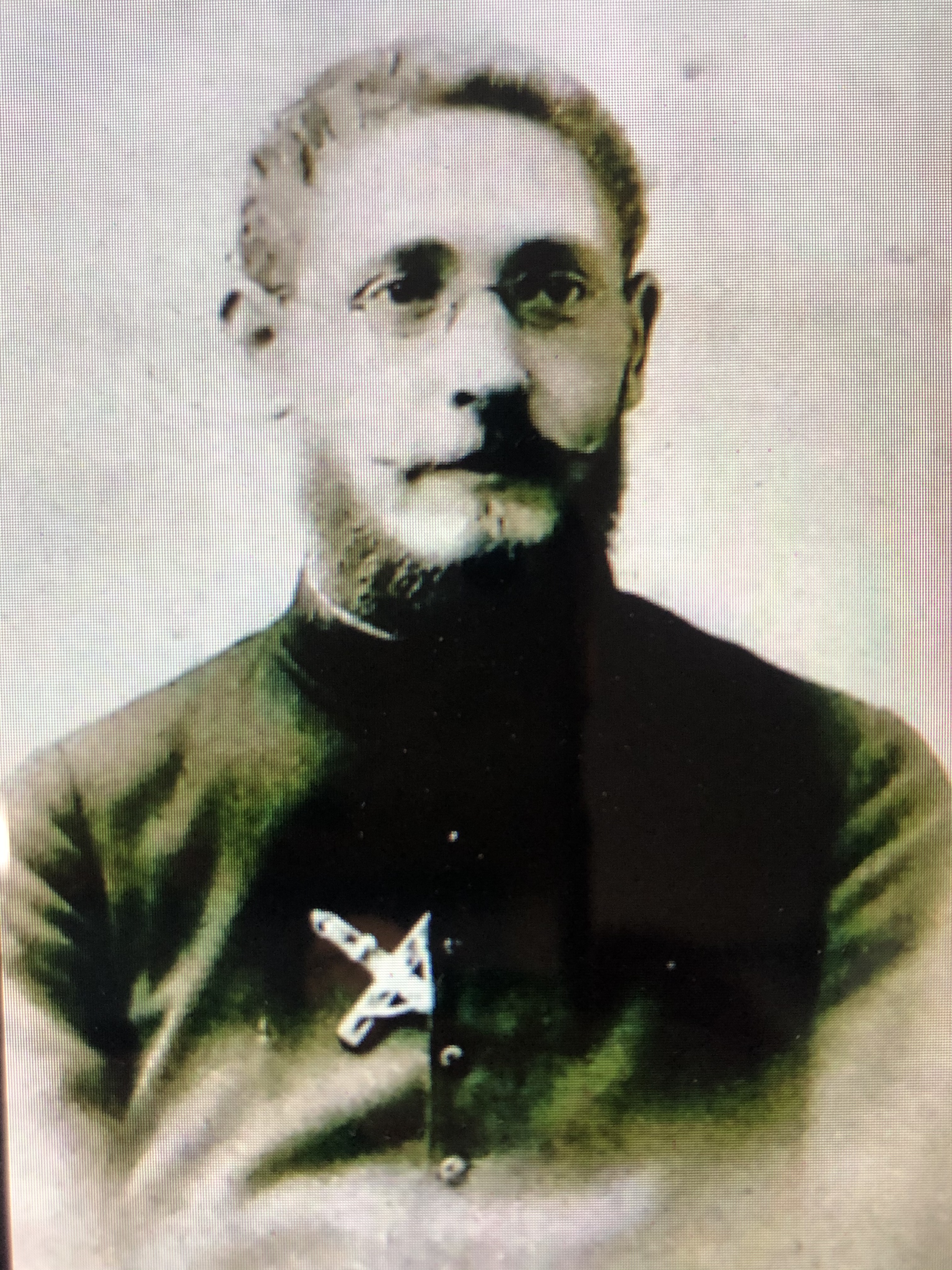
- Born: 30 October 1873
- Died: 27 January 1952 (aged 78)
- Other names: Eom Taek-gi
- Scientific career
- Fields: Botany; horticulture

Émile Joseph Taquet (30 October 1873 - 27 January 1952) was a French missionary and botanical collector who, as part of the Paris Foreign Missions Society, travelled extensively in Korea. He is known for collecting seeds and specimens of plants native to Korea.

== Life ==
Taquet was born on 30 October 1873 in Hecq, Nord, in northern France. He was the son of Hippolyte Taquet and Anna Wibaille. His family made a living making and selling clogs.

On 23 September 1892 Taquet entered the Paris Foreign Missions Society Seminary and studied until 27 September 1897. He arrived in Seoul via Jemulpo Port.

In April 1898, Taquet was dispatched to Gyeongsangnam-do, west of the Nakdonggang River. This was his first assignment after learning the Korean language from Father Imgamilo, the first head priest of Gamgok Maegoe Sanctuary Catholic Church (formerly Janghowon Catholic Church). Taquet spent a total of 55 years in Korea. He spent 31 years as an educator in Daegu, 13 years as a missionary and plant collector on Jeju Island, 7 years in numerous public offices on the islands and inland, including Mokpo and Naju, and 4 years in Busan, Jinju, and Masan. When World War I broke out in 1914, Taquet was exempted from conscription, so he never set foot on the French homeland again. Even after the death of his father, he simply asked his fellow priests and the bishop to pray.

Taquet regularly corresponded with Bishop Gustave Mutel. They exchanged letters about the church and Taquet's plant collecting. Mutel visited Taquet on Jeju Island in August 1907.

Upon his death on 27 January 1952, Taquet was buried in Daegu, Korea.

== Botanical work ==
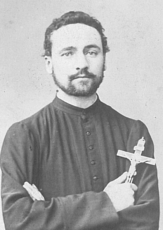
Urbain Jean Faurie

=== Collections with Urbain Jean Faurie ===
From 1902 to 1915, Taquet, who had taken the Korean name of Eom Taek-gi, conducted missionary activities on Jeju Island, and collected tens of thousands of plants native to the region. In 1907, Taquet collaborated with another French priest, Urbain Jean Faurie, who was doing missionary work in Aomori, Japan.

Faurie was a missionary of the Paris Foreign Missions Society and was dispatched to Japan. He made a great contribution to Japanese botany in its early days. Faurie spent most of his life in Japan, and he visited Korea three times. Faurie met Taquet in 1906 and 1907 on Jeju Island. At that time, 59-year-old Faurie and 33-year-old Taquet were more like father and son than senior and junior priests in the missionary school. Faurie taught Taquet how to collect plants and make specimens at Hongro Catholic Church in Seogwipo. Faurie had a decisive influence on Korean plant taxonomy in the early 1900s.

Faurie is thought to have passed on the method of collecting plants to Taquet while gathering from the seaside to Hallasan. The collections were sold to experts to fund missionary activities. The trip in 1907 was mainly limited to Jeju Island, and after arriving at Jeju Island via Mokpo at the end of May, Taquet and Faurie climbed Hallasan several times to gather specimens. They made important collections of species such as Aruncus aethusifolius and Persicaria taquetii.

During their expedition, Taquet and Faurie found a fir tree on Hallasan and sent the specimen to the Herbarium of the Arnold Arboretum at Harvard University in the United States. Ernest Henry Wilson, attributing the collection to Faurie, realized the species was new to the academic world. In 1920, it was published under the name of Abies koreana.

Overall, the joint expeditions of Taquet and Faurie greatly furthered the knowledge about the flora of Jeju Island.

=== Independent collections ===
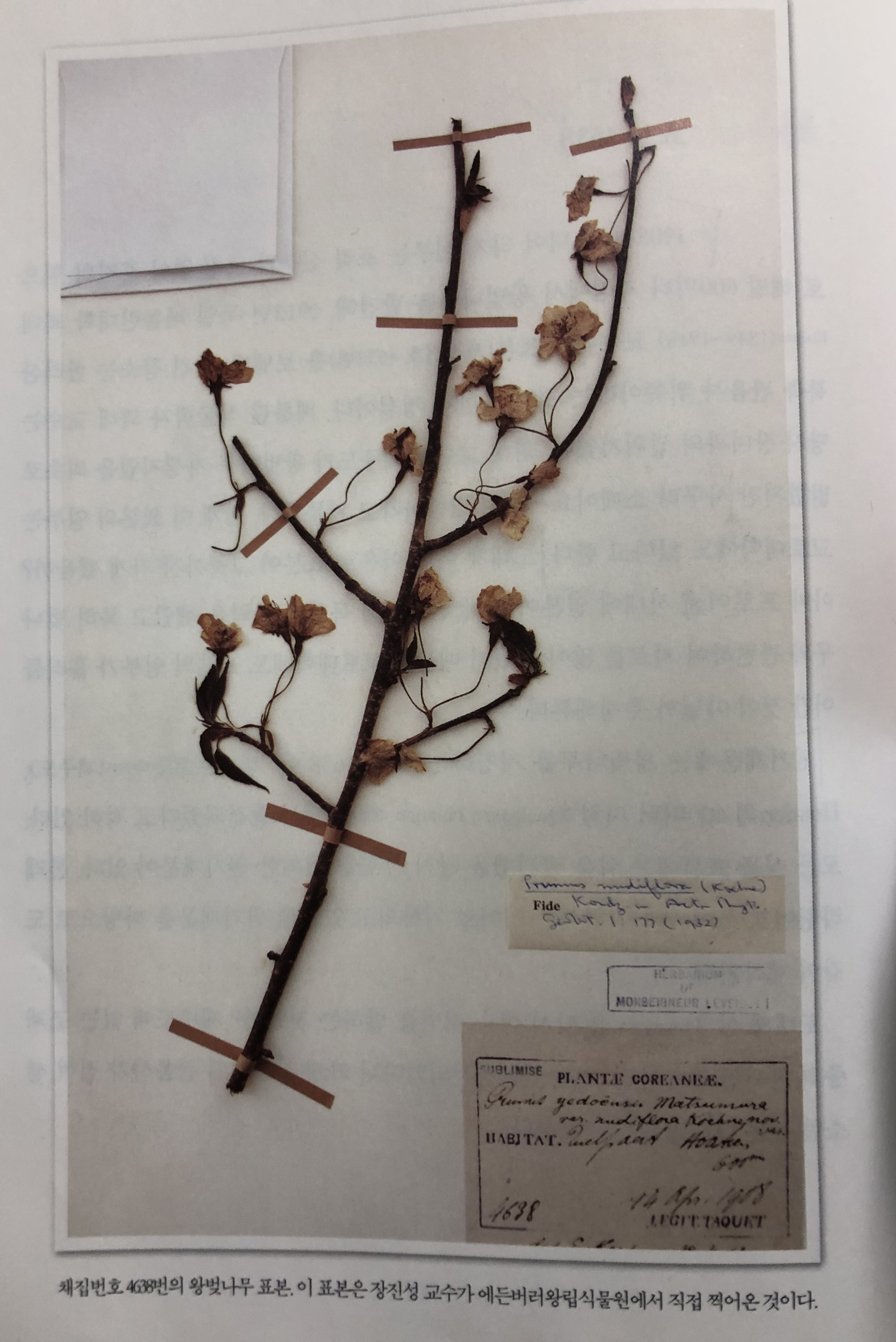
Herbarium specimen of a Jeju cherry tree collected by Taquet in 1908

In February 1908, Taquet began his first solo collecting trip. On April 14, he discovered the Jeju cherry tree, and was the first to report it to the European academic world. In 1912, Taquet sent a sample of the cherry tree ('specimen 4638') to Bernhard Adalbert Emil Koehne of the University of Berlin, Germany. In the original description, it is written that 'specimen 4638' was found at a point of 600 meters in Quelpaert (Jeju Island), Hoatien (currently Seogwipo Sinrye-ri) (Quelpaert, Hoatien, 600m). It is generally accepted that the place of discovery was behind Gwaneumsa Temple on the northern side of Hallasan.

Taquet's last known collecting trip was in 1913, which occurred in Mokpo and Incheon. Overall, the 7,047 plant specimens Taquet collected were mostly sent to the Royal Botanic Garden Edinburgh herbarium (more than 3,000 pieces), the National Museum of Natural History in Paris, Kyoto University, and the University of Tokyo. Many of Taquet's plant collections were delivered to the University of Tokyo in Japan through the Japanese botanist Takenoshin Nakai.

=== Planting and seed distribution ===
In 1911, Taquet received a small number of Wenzhou tangerine plants from Japan. He planted them around Jeju Island. This was the start of greater scale citrus cultivation in the region.

The plants and seeds collected by Taquet were sent all over the world, and he was specifically responsible for introducing many species of woody plants to the west.
