= Suwa-taisha =

Shinto shrine in Nagano Prefecture, Japan

Suwa Grand Shrine 諏訪大社 (Suwa-taisha)
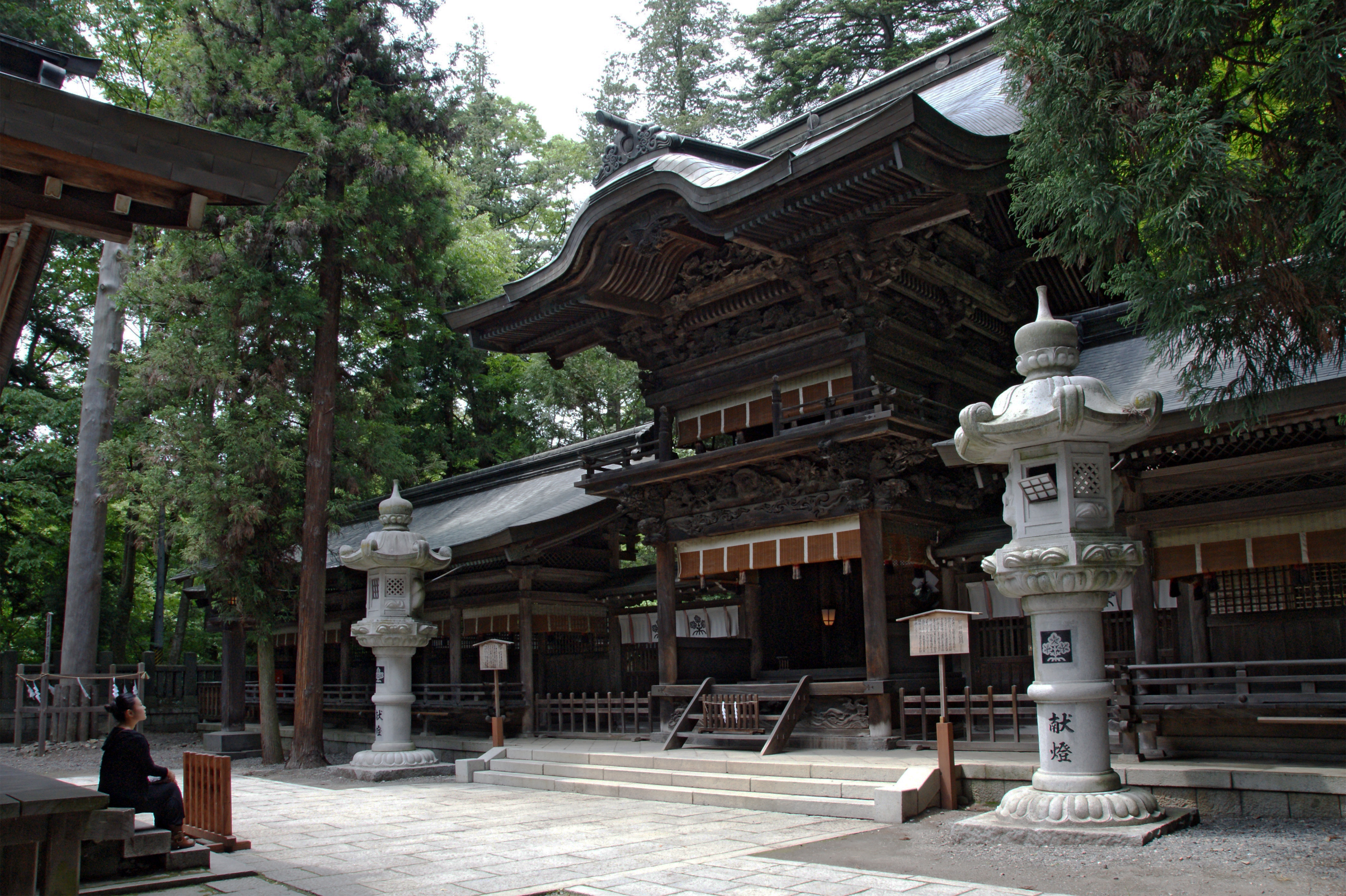
- The hei-haiden of the Harumiya, one of the two component shrines of the Lower Shrine or Shimosha

- Location within Nagano Prefecture

Religion
- Affiliation: Shinto
- Deity: Takeminakata; Yasakatome; Kotoshironushi
- Festivals: Onbashira Festival; Ontōsai (April 15th); Ofune Matsuri (August 1st); Misayama Festival (August 27th)

Location
- Location: Chino City, Nagano (Kamisha Maemiya); Suwa City, Nagano (Kamisha Honmiya); Shimosuwa, Nagano (Shimosha)
- Interactive map of Suwa Grand Shrine 諏訪大社 (Suwa-taisha)
- Coordinates: 35°59′53″N 138°07′10″E (Kamisha Honmiya) 35°59′28.1″N 138°08′00.2″E (Kamisha Maemiya); 36°04′31″N 138°05′28″E (Shimosha Akimiya) 36°04′55″N 138°04′55″E (Shimosha Harumiya)

Architecture
- Established: Unknown (circa 6th century?)

Website
- suwataisha.or.jp

Suwa Grand Shrine (Japanese: 諏訪大社, Hepburn: Suwa-taisha), historically also known as Suwa Shrine (諏訪神社 Suwa-jinja) or Suwa Daimyōjin (諏訪大明神), is a group of Shinto shrines in Nagano Prefecture, Japan. The shrine complex is the ichinomiya of former Shinano Province and is considered to be one of the oldest shrines in existence, being implied by the Nihon Shoki to already stand in the late 7th century.

== Overview ==
The entire Suwa shrine complex consists of four main shrines grouped into two sites: the Upper Shrine or Kamisha (上社), comprising the Maemiya (前宮, former shrine) and the Honmiya (本宮, main shrine), and the Lower Shrine or Shimosha (下社), comprising the Harumiya (春宮, spring shrine) and the Akimiya (秋宮, autumn shrine). The Upper Shrine is located on the south side of Lake Suwa, in the cities of Chino and Suwa, while the Lower Shrine is on the northern side of the lake, in the town of Shimosuwa.

In addition to these four main shrines, some sixty other auxiliary shrines scattered throughout the Lake Suwa area (ranging from miniature stone structures to medium to large sized edifices and compounds) are also part of the shrine complex. These are the focus of certain rituals in the shrine's religious calendar.

Historically, the Upper and the Lower Shrines have been two separate entities, each with its own set of shrines and religious ceremonies. The existence of two main sites, each one having a system parallel to but completely different from the other, complicates a study of the Suwa belief system as a whole. One circumstance that simplifies the matter somewhat, however, is that very little documentation for the Lower Shrine has been preserved; almost all extant historical and ritual documents regarding Suwa Shrine extant today are those of the Upper Shrine.

== Deities ==
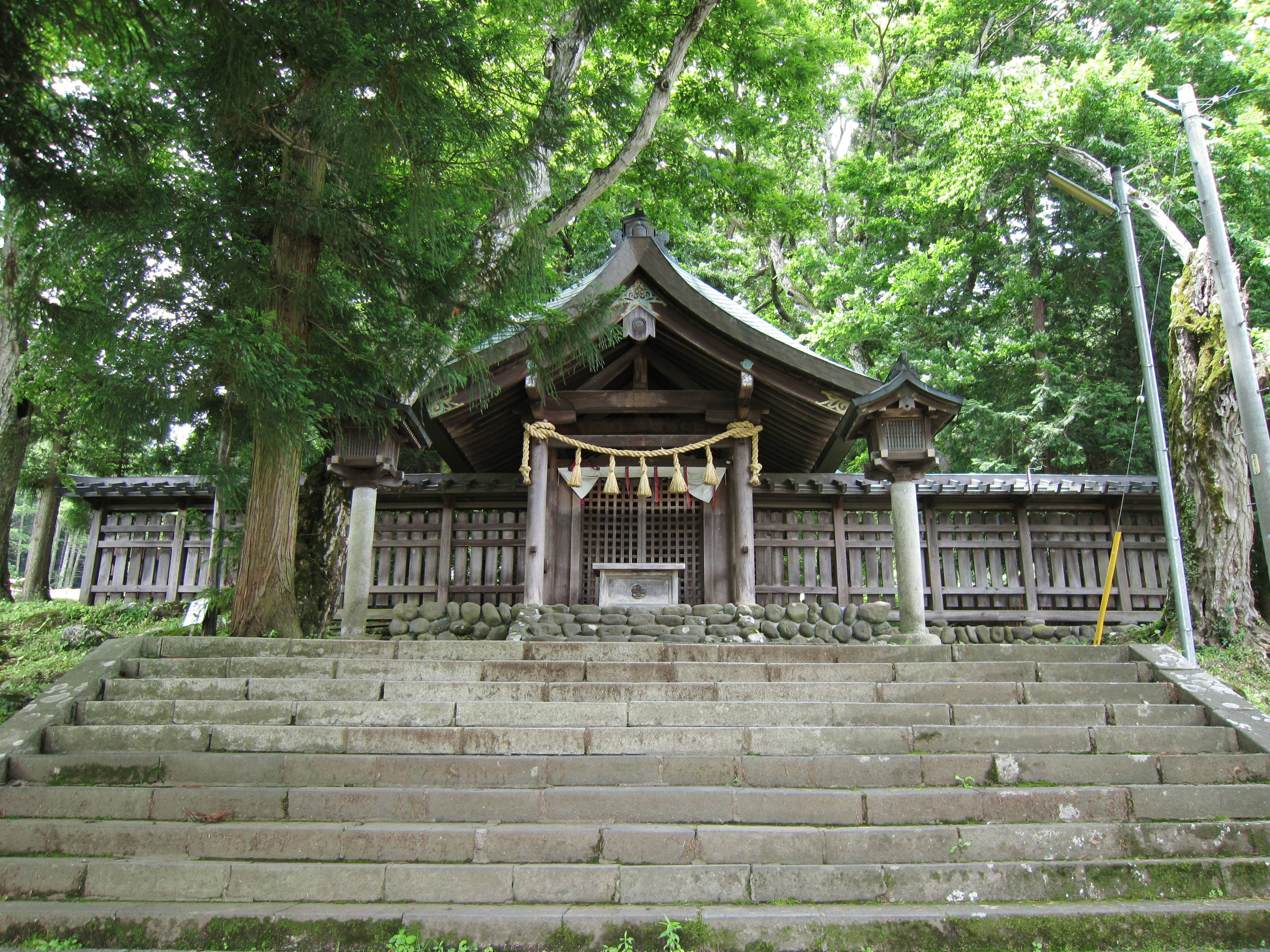
The Kamisha Maemiya's honden, built in 1932 using timber from the Grand Shrine of Ise. This honden replaced a different structure that originally stood in the same spot.

The Upper and Lower Shrines of Suwa were historically associated with a male and female kami, respectively. The god of the Upper Shrine, named Takeminakata in the imperially-commissioned official histories, is also often popularly referred to as 'Suwa Myōjin' (諏訪明神), 'Suwa Daimyōjin' (諏訪大明神), or 'Suwa-no-Ōkami' (諏訪大神, 'Great Kami of Suwa'). The goddess of the Lower Shrine, held to be Takeminakata's consort, is given the name Yasakatome in these texts.

While both the Kojiki (ca. 712 CE) and the Sendai Kuji Hongi (807-936 CE) portray Takeminakata as a son of Ōkuninushi, the god of Izumo Province, who fled to Suwa after his shameful defeat in the hands of the warrior god Takemikazuchi, who was sent by the gods of heaven to demand that his father relinquish his rule over the terrestrial realm, other myths and legends depict the Suwa deity differently. In one story, for instance, the god of the Upper Shrine is an interloper who conquered the region by defeating various local deities who resisted him such as the god Moriya (Moreya). In a feudal Buddhist legend, this god is identified as a king from India whose feats included quelling a rebellion in his kingdom and defeating a dragon in Persia before manifesting in Japan as a native kami. In another feudal folk story, the god is said to have originally been a warrior named Kōga Saburō who returned from a journey into the underworld only to find himself transformed into a serpent or dragon. A fourth myth portrays the Suwa deity appointing an eight-year-old boy to become his priest and physical 'body'; the boy eventually became the founder of the Upper Shrine's high priestly lineage.

Both Takeminakata and Yasakatome are now worshiped together in the Upper and Lower Shrines, with the god Kotoshironushi (another son of Ōkuninushi and Takeminakata's brother) being enshrined alongside them in the Lower Shrine as an auxiliary deity.

- Kamisha Honmiya: Takeminakata
- Kamisha Maemiya: Yasakatome
- Shimosha Harumiya, Shimosha Akimiya: Takeminakata, Yasakatome, Kotoshironushi

Like others among Japan's oldest shrines, three of Suwa Shrine's four main sites - the Kamisha Honmiya and the two main shrines of the Shimosha - do not have a honden, the building that normally enshrines a shrine's kami. Instead, the Upper Shrine's objects of worship were the sacred mountain behind the Kamisha Honmiya, a sacred rock (磐座 iwakura) upon which Suwa Myōjin was thought to descend, and the shrine's former high priest or Ōhōri, who was considered to be the physical incarnation of the god himself. This was later joined by Buddhist structures (removed or demolished during the Meiji period) which were also revered as symbols of the deity.

The Lower Shrine, meanwhile, has sacred trees for its go-shintai: a sugi tree in the Harumiya, and a yew tree in the Akimiya.

== History ==
=== Early history ===
==== Upper Shrine ====
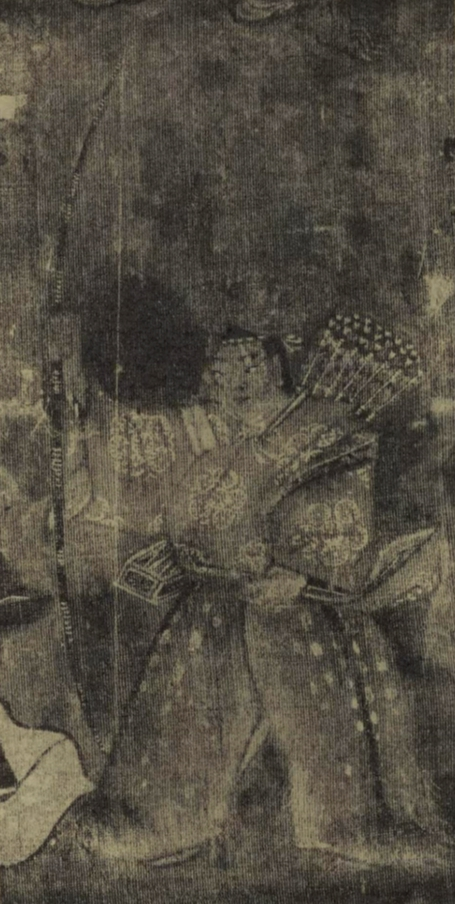
Suwa Myōjin depicted in the guise of a hunter

The origins of the Upper and Lower Shrines of Suwa are shrouded in mystery. The Nihon Shoki (720 CE) refers to envoys sent to worship "the wind-gods of Tatsuta and the gods of Suwa and Minochi in Shinano [Province]" (Note: 「遣使者、祭龍田風神、信濃須波・水内等神。」) during the fifth year of the reign of Empress Jitō (691 CE), which suggests that a notable kami in Suwa was already being worshiped by the imperial (Yamato) court as a water and/or wind deity during the late 7th century, on par with the wind gods of Tatsuta Shrine in Yamato Province (modern Nara Prefecture).

Fune Kofun, a burial mound dating from the early 5th century discovered near the Kamisha Honmiya in 1959, yielded a number of important artifacts, among them weapons and implements of a ritual nature such as two dakōken (蛇行剣, a wave-bladed ceremonial sword). The tomb's location and the nature of the grave goods suggest that the individuals buried therein were important personages perhaps connected in some way to what would become the Upper Shrine. The presence of the snake-like dakōken and other items made of deer antlers have been connected to the identification of the Upper Shrine's god as a serpent in folk beliefs and the prominence of hunting animals such as deer in the shrine's rituals.

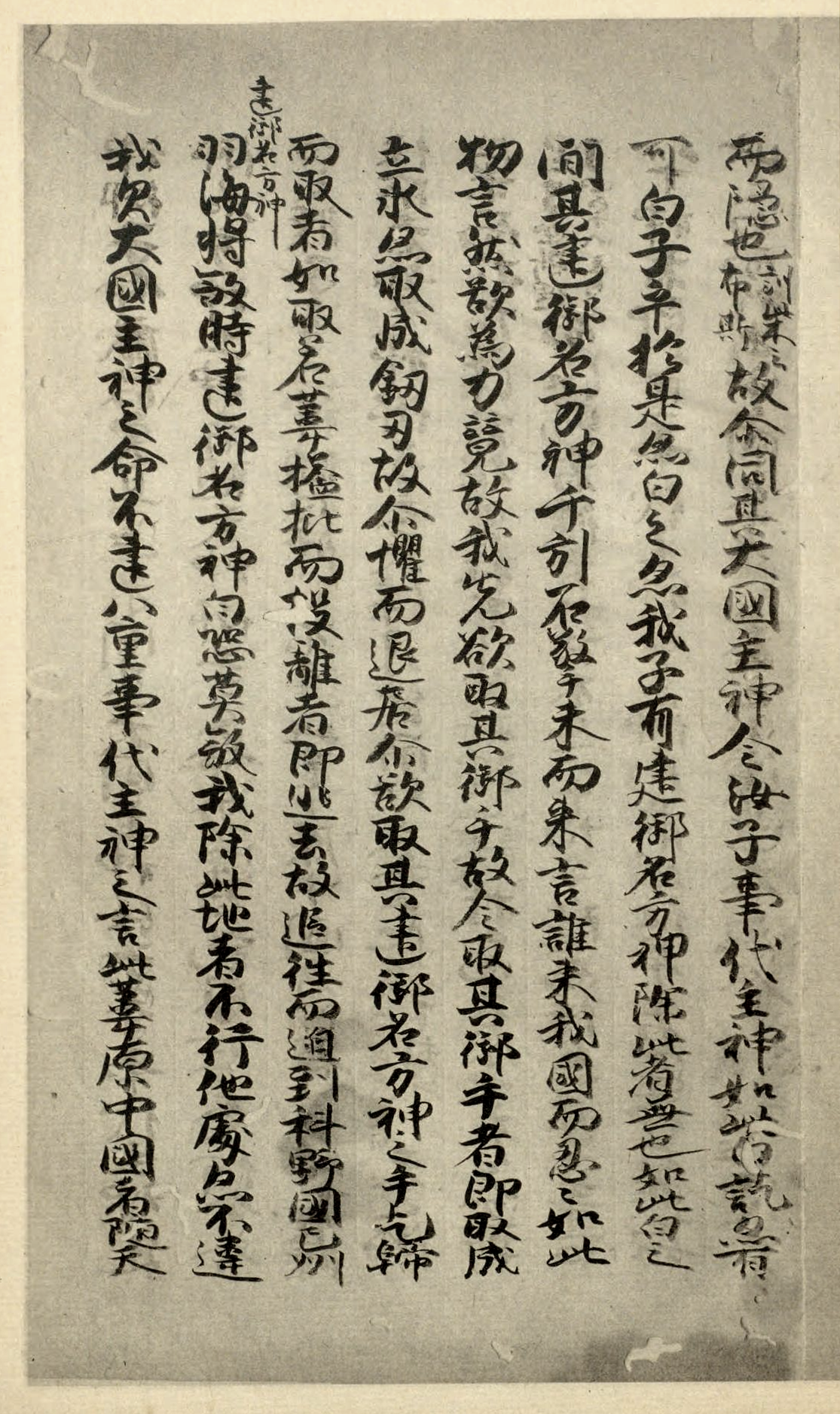
The Shinpukuji-bon (真福寺本) manuscript of the Kojiki (written 1371-1372)

Local historians have seen the legend that speaks of the Upper Shrine's deity as an intruding conqueror who wrested control of the Lake Suwa region from the native god Moriya (Moreya) to reflect the subjugation of local clans who controlled the area by invaders allied with the Yamato state - identified as the founders of the Upper Shrine's high priestly (大祝 Ōhōri) house - around the late 6th/early 7th centuries, with the appearance of burial mounds markedly different from the type exemplified by Fune Kofun heretofore common in the region around this time period being taken as the signs of Yamato expansion into Suwa, though this idea has been called into question in recent years due to the myth's late (medieval) attestation and its similarity to stories concerning the conflict between Prince Shōtoku and Mononobe no Moriya that were in wide circulation during the Middle Ages.

'Takeminakata', the name by which the deity of the Upper Shrine is more commonly known to the imperial court, appears in the historical record for the first time in the Kojiki's (711-712 CE) kuni-yuzuri myth cycle. Although the work associates Takeminakata with the province of Izumo and its deity Ōkuninushi, references to such a deity are curiously absent from the Nihon Shoki or other sources dealing with the province. Takeminakata is thus believed by a number of scholars to have been interpolated by the Kojiki's compilers into a myth which did not originally feature him.

The earliest surviving literary references to a shrine in Suwa dedicated to Takeminakata are in the Shinshō Kyakuchoku Fushō (新抄格勅符抄 'New Extracts from Decrees and Edicts', 806 CE), which speaks of "Takeminakatatomi-no-Mikoto-no-Kami" being given land grants by the court, and the Sendai Kuji Hongi, commonly dated to the 9th-10th century, which explicitly refers to Takeminakata as being enshrined in "Suwa Shrine in the district of Suwa in Shinano Province" (信濃国諏方郡諏方神社).

The national histories record Takeminakata's exceptionally rapid rise in importance: from rankless (无位), the imperial court steadily promoted the deity to increasingly higher ranks within the space of twenty-five years, beginning with junior fifth, upper grade (従五位上) in 842 CE. By 867 CE, 'Takeminakatatomi-no-Mikoto' is recorded in the Nihon Sandai Jitsuroku as being elevated to the rank of junior first (従一位).

==== Lower Shrine ====
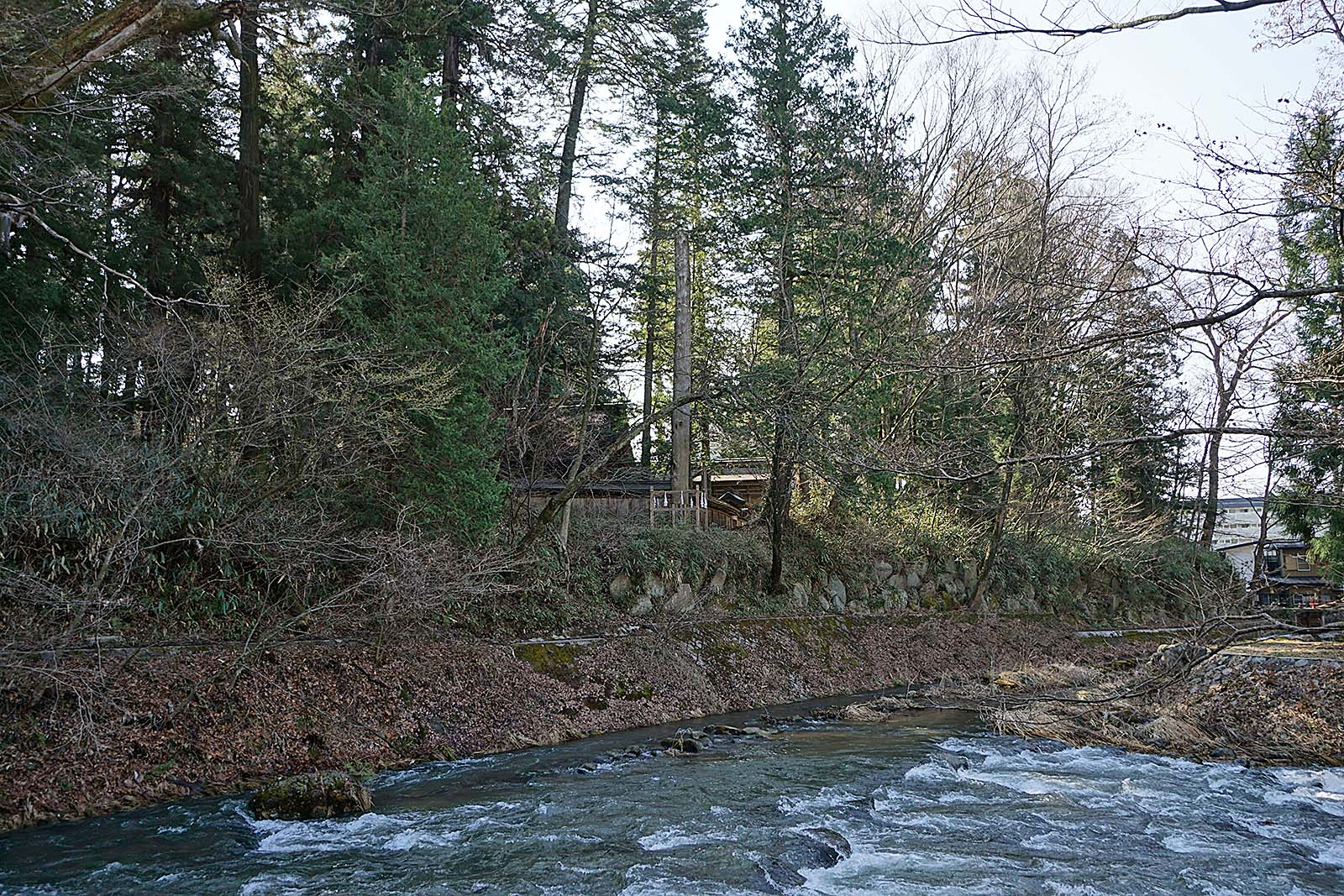
The Togawa River flowing beside the Shimosha Harumiya; one of the shrine's onbashira is visible in the middle.

One theory suggests that the cult of the Lower Shrine may have originated from the worship of the kami of the nearby mountains and rivers. The Harumiya, one of the Lower Shrine's two component shrines, is located beside the Togawa River, which flows from the Yashimagahara Wetlands northwest of Kirigamine Plateau, where Moto-Misayama (旧御射山), the former sacred hunting grounds of the Lower Shrine, is situated.

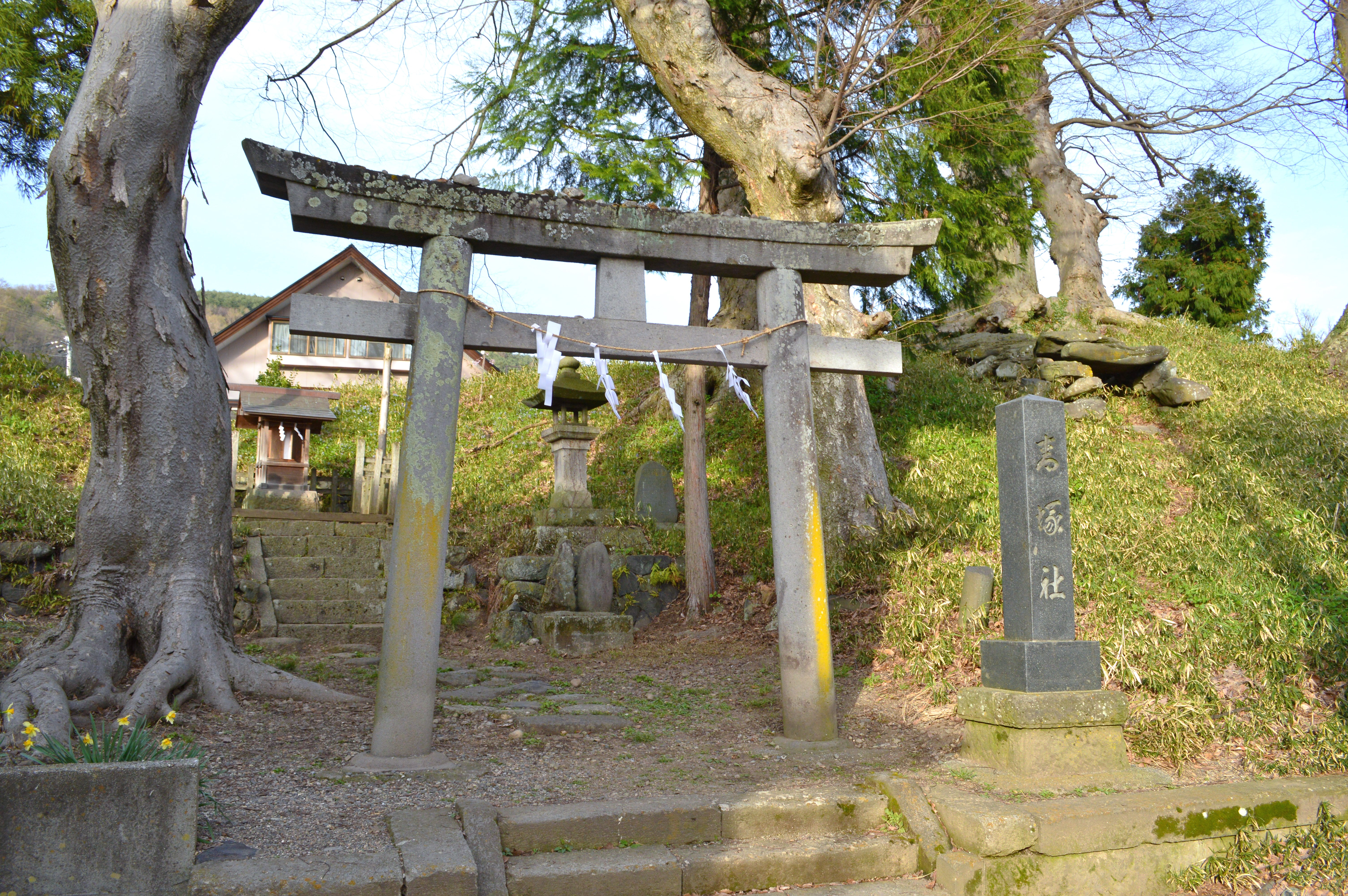
Aozuka Kofun (青塚古墳), a keyhole-shaped burial mound in Shimosuwa, near the Shimosha. The only kofun of such type in the Suwa area, it is believed to be the tomb of an influential local authority, perhaps a member of the Kanasashi.

The Lower Shrine is also associated with a clan known as the Kanasashi (金刺, also read as 'Kanesashi' or 'Kanazashi'), the offshoot of a local magnate clan (kuni no miyatsuko) which eventually became the shrine's high priests. The Kanasashi are thought to have been originally district magistrates (郡領 gunryō) in charge of producing and collecting taxed goods and laborers to be sent to the central government in Yamato Province. Their seat of power seems to have been located near what is now the Lower Shrine, which was close to the important crossroads that led to the capital. Indeed, the Shimosha Akimiya may have started as a kind of ancestral shrine to the clan's forebears; it is located nearby Aozuka Kofun, a burial mound notable for being the only keyhole tomb in the Lake Suwa region and which may have been the grave of a Kanasashi clan member.

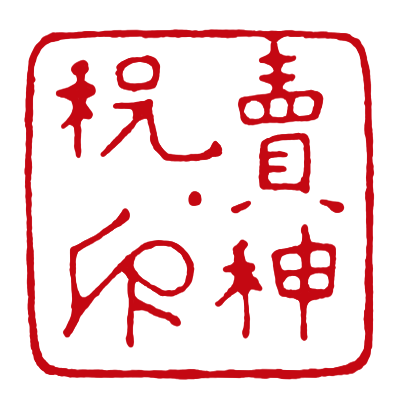
Seal of the Megamihōri (売神祝印 Megamihōri-no-in)

The Nihon Sandai Jitsuroku mentions a Kanasashi, Sadanaga (貞長), receiving the kabane Ōason (大朝臣) in the year 863. (Note: 「信濃國諏方郡人右近衛將監正六位上金刺舍人貞長賜姓大朝臣。並是神八井耳命之苗裔也。」) A genealogy of the Lower Shrine's high priestly line records an elder brother of his, Masanaga (正長), who in addition to being the district governor (大領 dairyō) of Hanishina District, also held the title of Megamihōri (売神祝) or 'priest of the goddess'. The same title appears in a seal in the Lower Shrine's possession (designed as an Important Cultural Property in 1934) traditionally said to have been bequeathed by the Emperor Heizei (reigned 806-809). This shows that the shrine's deity - named 'Yasakatome' in imperial records - is already conceived of as a goddess in the 9th century.

As Takeminakata, the Upper Shrine's god, rose up in rank, so did Yasakatome, so that by 867 CE, the goddess had been promoted to senior second rank (正二位).

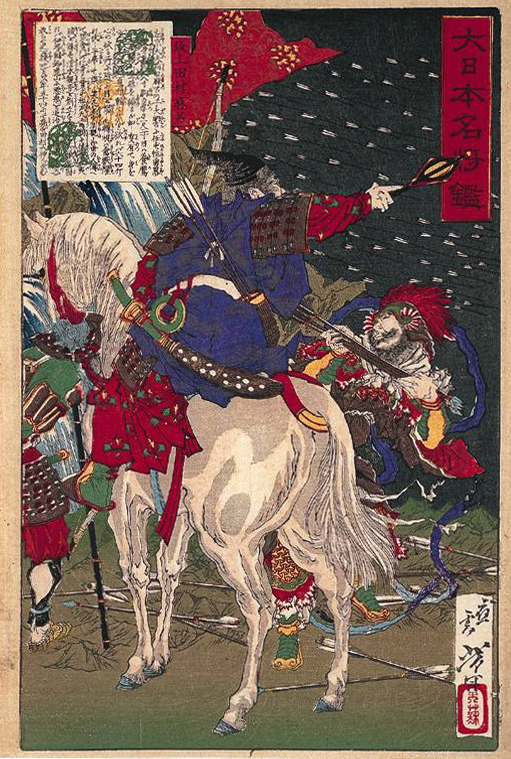
Sakanoue no Tamuramaro by Yoshitoshi

=== Heian and Kamakura periods ===
By the late Heian period, Suwa became considered as Shinano Province's chief shrine or ichinomiya. with literary mentions attesting to its status. The 'Register of Deities' (神名帳 Jinmyōchō) section of the Engishiki (927 CE) lists the 'Minakatatomi Shrines' (南方刀美神社) as the two major ('eminent') shrines of Suwa district. (Note: 「諏方郡_{二座 並大} 南方刀美神社_{二座 名神大}」) 'Suwa Shrine of Shinano' is mentioned briefly in Minamoto no Tsuneyori (976/985-1039) diary, the Sakeiki (左経記) as the representative shrine for Shinano Province when Emperor Go-Ichijō sent an envoy to shrines in every province in the country in 1017 CE.

It was probably around this time that the kami of Suwa began to be conceived of as a warrior deity. A famous legend relates that the Suwa deity appeared to the 8th century general Sakanoue no Tamuramaro during his campaign to subjugate the Emishi of northeastern Japan; in thanksgiving for the god's assistance, Tamuramaro was said to have petitioned the court for the institution of the shrine's religious festivals. The Ryōjin Hishō, an anthology of songs compiled in 1179, names the shrine of Suwa among famous shrines to martial deities in the eastern half of the country.

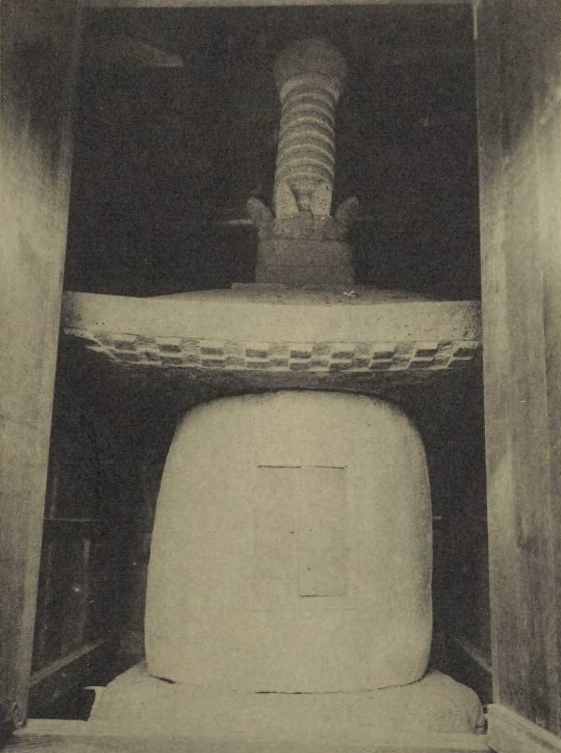
The 'Iron Pagoda' (鉄塔 Tettō) that originally stood inside the inner sanctum of the Kamisha Honmiya (currently located in Onsenji Temple in Suwa City)

As Buddhism began to penetrate Suwa and syncretize with local beliefs, the deities of the Upper and Lower Shrines came to be identified with the bodhisattvas Samantabhadra (Fugen) and Avalokiteśvara (Kannon), respectively. Buddhist temples and other edifices (most of which belonged to the esoteric Shingon school) were erected on the precincts of both shrines, such as a sanctuary to Samantabhadra known as the Fugen-dō (普賢堂) and a stone pagoda symbolizing the legendary iron tower in India where, according to Shingon tradition, Nagarjuna was said to have received esoteric teachings from Vajrasattva (considered to be an aspect of Samantabhadra) called the Tettō (鉄塔 "iron tower"). For a long time, these two structures were considered as the Upper Shrine's objects of worship. As Buddhist ethics, which opposed the taking of life and Mahayana's strict views on vegetarianism somewhat conflicted with Suwa Myōjin's status as a god of hunting, the Suwa cult devised elaborate theories that legitimized the hunting, eating, and sacrifice of animals such as deer (a beast sacred to the god) within a Buddhist framework. The shrines produced special talismans (鹿食免 kajikimen "permit to eat venison") and chopsticks (鹿食箸 kajikibashi) that were held to allow the bearer to eat meat.

The prominence of hunting in the shrine's religious rites undoubtedly caught the attention of the samurai class. Devotion to the deity of Suwa (especially as god of war) became more widespread thanks in part to the rise of the Upper Shrine's high priestly family - now calling themselves the Jin/Miwa (神) or the Suwa (諏訪) - as vassals (gokenin) of the Kamakura shogunate and the Hōjō clan. The shrines of Suwa and the priestly clans thereof flourished under the patronage of the Hōjō, which promoted devotion to the god as a sign of loyalty to the shogunate. The religious festivals of the Upper and Lower Shrines attracted many of the samurai caste as well as other social classes, both from within Shinano and outside. The Hōjō appointed local land managers (jitō) and retainers, who were sometimes Hōjō family members, as sponsors (御頭 otō or ontō) of the festivals, which helped provide financial support for the shrines. To offset the burden of this service, these sponsors enjoyed a number of benefits such as exemption from certain provincial taxes and the right to be pardoned for crimes during their year of service as otō.

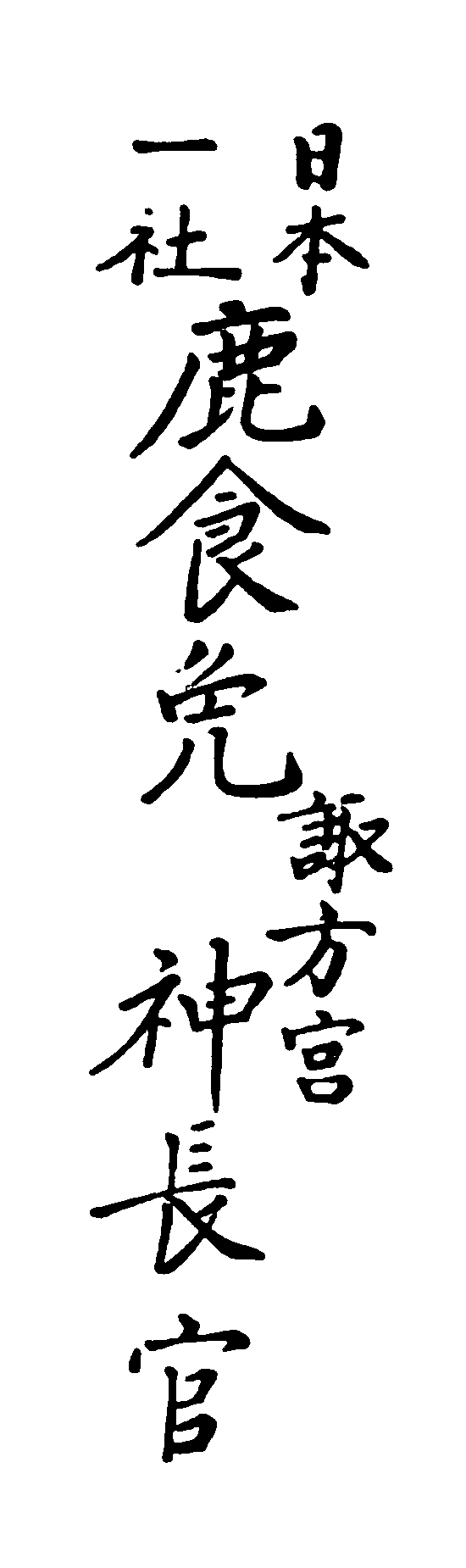
A kajikimen (鹿食免) issued by the Upper Shrine's Jinchōkan dating from 1850 (Kaei 3). This talisman was held to give divine permission to the bearer to eat meat at a time when meat consumption was frowned upon in Japanese society and thus were in high demand.

Around this time, Suwa branch shrines became numerous all across Japan, especially in territories held by clans devoted to the god (for instance, the Kantō region, traditional stronghold of the Minamoto (Seiwa Genji) clan). A number of factors were instrumental for this spread of the Suwa Myōjin cult. First, warriors from Shinano Province who were rewarded lands in the western provinces by the shogunate in the aftermath of the Jōkyū War of 1221 took the Suwa cult with them. Second, the shogunate appointed major non-Shinano vassals to manors in the province, who then acted as sponsors and participants in the shrine rituals, eventually installing the cult in their native areas. A third factor was the exemption granted to the shrines of Suwa from the ban on falconry (takagari) - a favorite sport of the upper classes - imposed by the shogunate in 1212, due to the importance of hunting in its rites. As a loophole to this ban, the gokenin built Suwa branch shrines in their own provinces where 'Suwa style' falconry could be performed, ostensibly to collect offerings for the shrine. The Suwa cult was also propagated by wandering preachers (御師 oshi) who traveled around Shinano and neighboring provinces, preaching stories about the Suwa deity as well as distributing kajikimen and kajikibashi to the populace, collecting offerings and donations in exchange.

=== Muromachi and Sengoku periods ===
The shrines suffered a heavy setback at the downfall of the Hōjō and the collapse of the shogunate in 1333. Testifying to the close connections between the warrior families of the Suwa region and the Hōjō is the fact that many members of the Suwa clan present in Kamakura during the siege of the city in 1333 committed suicide alongside Hōjō Takatoki.

Takatoki's son, the young Tokiyuki, sought refuge in Shinano with Suwa Yorishige (諏訪頼重, not to be confused with the Sengoku period daimyō of the same name) and his son and then-Ōhōri, Tokitsugu (時継). In July–August 1335, the Suwa and other clans who remained loyal to the Hōjō, led by Tokiyuki, instigated an unsuccessful armed rebellion with the intention of reestablishing the Kamakura shogunate, which ended with the defeat of Tokiyuki's forces and Yorishige, Tokitsugu and some others committing suicide. Tokitsugu's son who inherited the priesthood, Yoritsugu (頼継), was stripped from his position and replaced by Fujisawa Masayori (藤沢政頼), who hailed from a cadet branch of the clan. Now declared an enemy of the imperial throne, Yoritsugu went into hiding.

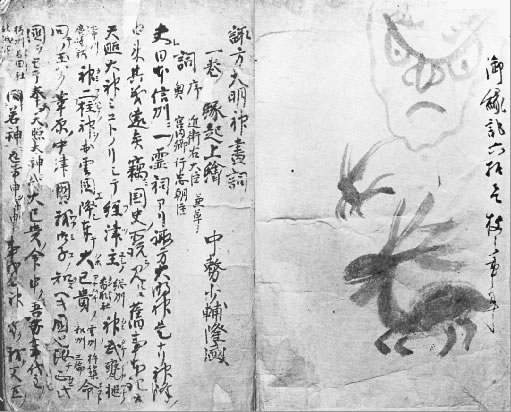
Suwa Daimyōjin Ekotoba (Gonhōri-bon)

It is believed that the story of Kōga Saburō, which portrays Suwa Myōjin as a warrior hero and a hunter, originated in the aftermath of the shogunate's collapse and the Suwa Ōhōri's status becoming diminished as a result. Whereas formerly, the Suwa clan relied on the doctrine of the Upper Shrine's high priest being a god in the flesh to exert authority over its warrior devotees (Minamoto no Yoritomo in 1186 reprimanded subordinates for not obeying the Ōhōri, declaring that his words are those of the god of Suwa himself), with the loss of official backing the Suwa shrine network became decentralized. Warriors who were devoted to the Suwa cult sought for stories (setsuwa) about the deity that did not involve the Ōhōri or the Suwa clan, leading to the rise of localized setsuwa such as the Kōga Saburō legend.

Suwa (or Kosaka) Enchū, government official and member of a cadet branch of the Suwa, took it upon himself to revive the former status of Suwa Shrine. To this end, he commissioned a set of ten illustrated scrolls (later expanded to twelve) showcasing the shrine's history and its various religious ceremonies, which was completed in 1356. The actual scrolls were later lost, but its text portions were copied and widely circulated, becoming known as the Suwa Daimyōjin Ekotoba.

By the 14th century, the high priestly houses of the Upper and Lower Shrines, the Suwa and the Kanasashi were at war with each other and, in the Suwa's case, among themselves. During the Nanboku-chō period, the Suwa supported the Southern Court, while the Kanasashi chose to side with the Northern Court. This and other reasons contributed to the state of war between the two families, as well as other clans allied with them, during the Muromachi and Sengoku periods. During a battle between the two factions in 1483, the Lower Shrines were burned down by the Upper Shrine's forces; its high priest, Kanasashi Okiharu (金刺興春), was killed in battle.

In 1535, Takeda Nobutora of Kai Province, who fought against the Suwa clan a number of times, had a truce with clan leader Suwa Yorishige and sent his daughter Nene off to him as his wife. His clan, the Takeda, were already known to be devotees of the Suwa deity since the 12th century, when in 1140, Takeda Nobuyoshi donated lands to each of the two shrines of Suwa in thanksgiving for his defeat of the Taira. By marrying his daughter to Yorishige, Nobutora was trying to bring himself closer to the Suwa and thus, ensuring that he would receive the blessings of the god.

In 1542, Nobutora's son Shingen invaded Shinano and defeated Yorishige in a series of sieges; two years later Yorishige was forced to commit seppuku. Shingen then took Yorishige's daughter (his niece) to be one of his wives and had a son with her, Katsuyori, who would eventually prove to be the downfall of the Takeda. Shingen notably did not give his son the character traditionally used in Takeda names, 信 (nobu), but instead the character 頼 (yori) used for the names of Suwa clan members, apparently as a sign of Katsuyori being the intended heir to the Suwa legacy and of Shingen's desire to place the land of Suwa and its shrines under Takeda control.

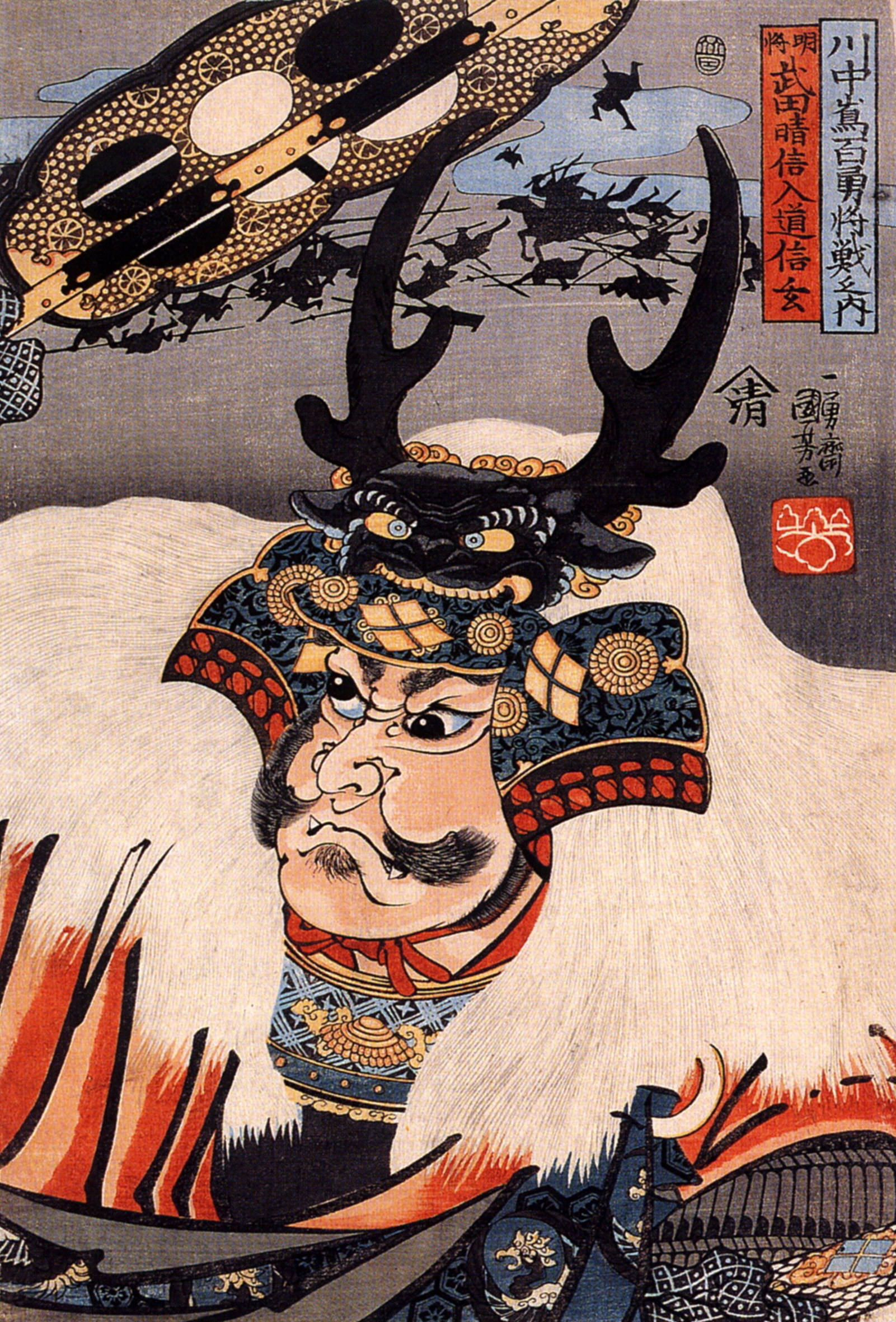
Takeda Shingen by Utagawa Kuniyoshi

After Yorishige's downfall, Suwa was divided between the Takeda and their ally, Takatō Yoritsugu (高遠頼継), who coveted the position of high priest. When he did not receive the priestly office, Yoritsugu invaded the other half of the territory that was in Takeda hands. Ensuring that Yoritsugu will not receive support from the former Suwa retainers, Shingen made Yorishige's son the nominal leader of the forces of resistance and retaliated by capturing Yoritsugu's castles. Shingen is said to have prayed at the Upper Shrine for victory, vowing to donate a horse and a set of armor should he defeat Yoritsugu. His making Yorishige's son the nominal head of his troops is also believed to be a way to invoke the aid of the Suwa deity. Apart from this, there are other recorded instances of Shingen praying to the god to assist him in his campaigns.

From 1565 onwards, Shingen (who by now had conquered the whole of Shinano Province) issued orders for the revival of religious rituals in the Upper and Lower Shrines which were discontinued due to the chaos of war and lack of financial support, which also helped him both strengthen his control over Shinano and unify the people of the province.

Shingen's devotion to the god of Suwa is also evident in some of his war banners, which bore the god's syncretized Buddhist name: Suwa Nangū Hosshō Kamishimo Daimyōjin (諏方南宮法性上下大明神 'Dharma-Nature Daimyōjin of the Suwa Upper and Lower Southern Shrines'), as well as his iconic helmet, the Suwa Hosshō helmet (諏訪法性兜).

In 1582, the eldest son of Oda Nobunaga, Nobutada, led an army into Takeda-controlled Shinano and burned the Upper Shrine to the ground. The shrine was subsequently rebuilt two years later.

=== Edo and later periods ===
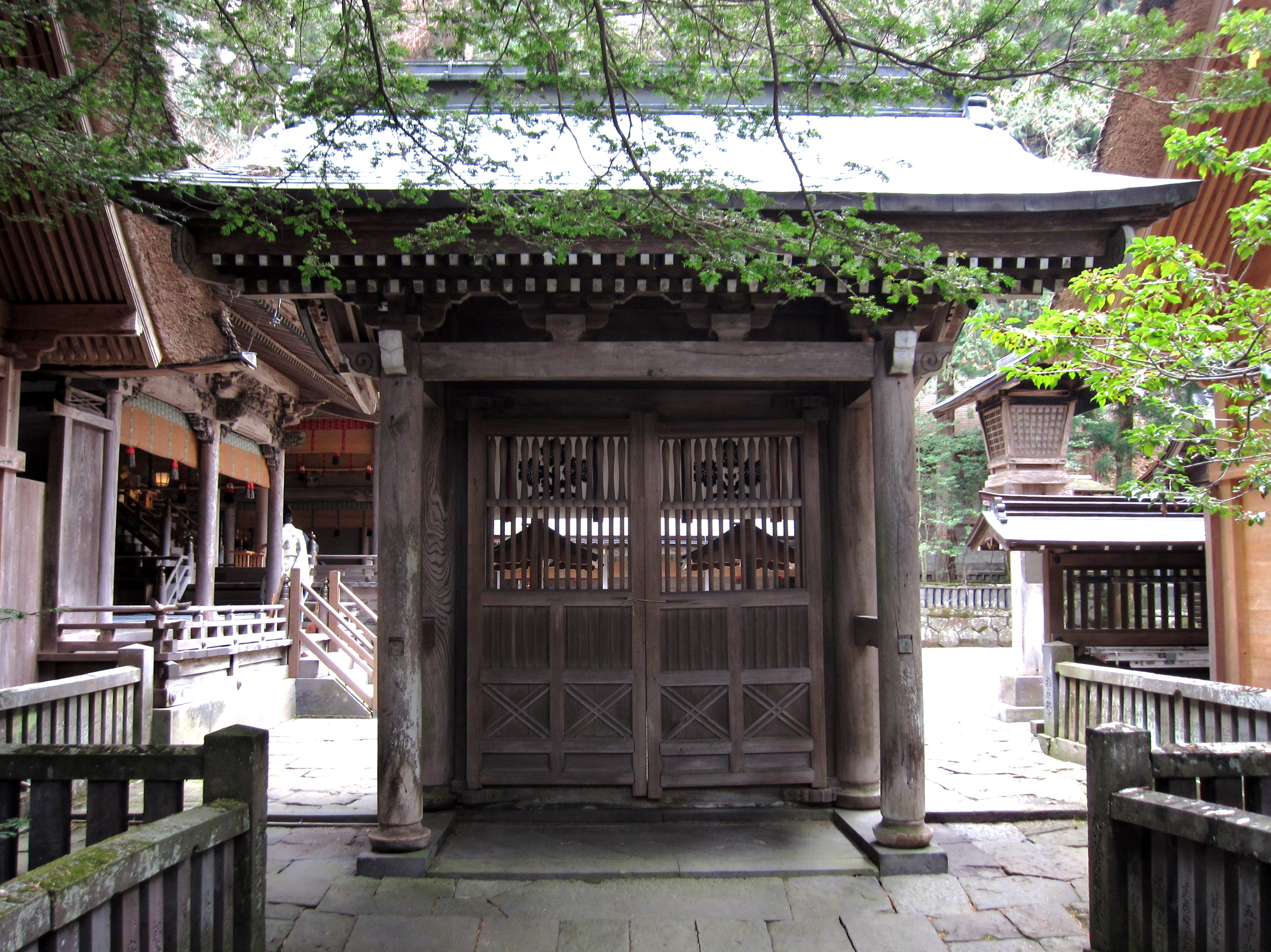
A shikyakumon (四脚門) at the Honmiya donated in 1608 by Tokugawa Ieyasu.

During the Edo period, both shrines were recognized and supported by the Tokugawa shogunate and the local government, with both being given land grants by the shōgun and the local daimyō.

The period saw escalating tensions between the priests and the shrine monks (shasō) of the Suwa complex, with increasing attempts from the priesthood to distance themselves from the Buddhist temples. By the end of the Edo period, the priests, deeply influenced by Hirata Atsutane's nativist, anti-Buddhist teachings, became extremely antagonistic towards the shrine temples and their monks. In 1864 and 1867, Buddhist structures in the Lower Shrine were set on fire by unknown perpetrators; in the latter case, it was rumored to have been caused by the shrine's priests.

The establishment of State Shinto after the Meiji Restoration in 1868 brought an end to the union between Shinto and Buddhism. The shrines of Suwa, due to their prominent status as ichinomiya of Shinano, were chosen as one of the primary targets for the edict of separation, which took effect swiftly and thoroughly. The shrine monks were laicized and Buddhist symbols either removed from the complex or destroyed; the shrines' Buddhist rites, such as the yearly offering of a copy of the Lotus Sutra to the Upper Shrine's deity, were discontinued. The now laicized monks at first tried to continue serving at the shrines as Shinto priests; however, due to continued discrimination from the shrine priesthood, they gave up and left. The priests themselves were soon ousted from their offices as the state abolished hereditary succession among Shinto priests and private ownership of shrines across the country; the Ōhōri - now stripped of his divine status - as well as the other local priestly houses were replaced by government-appointed priests.

In 1871, the Upper and Lower Shrines - now under government control - were merged into a single institution, Suwa Shrine (諏訪神社 Suwa-jinja), and received the rank of kokuhei-chūsha (国幣中社), before being promoted to Kanpei Chūsha (官幣中社) in 1896 and finally, to the highest rank of kanpei-taisha (官幣大社) in 1916. After World War II, the shrine was listed as a special-class shrine (別表神社 beppyō-jinja) by the Association of Shinto Shrines and renamed Suwa Grand Shrine (Suwa-taisha) in 1948.

== Shrines ==
=== Upper Shrine ===
==== Kamisha Honmiya ====
Suwa Taisha Kamisha Honmiya (諏訪大社 上社本宮)
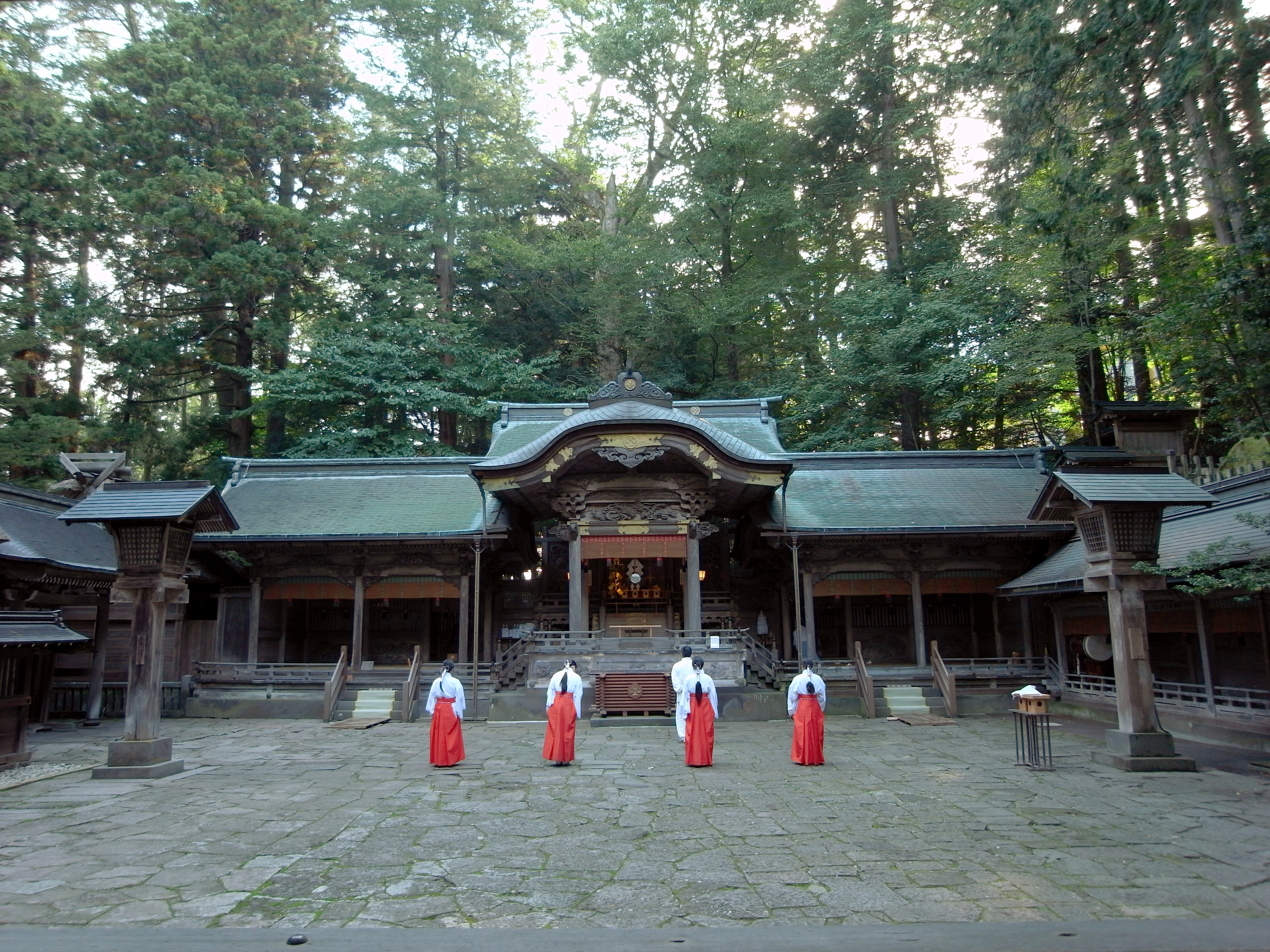
- The hei-haiden of the Honmiya

Religion
- Affiliation: Shinto
- Deity: Takeminakata

Location
- Location: Suwa City, Nagano
- Interactive map of Suwa Taisha Kamisha Honmiya (諏訪大社 上社本宮)
- Coordinates: 35°59′53″N 138°07′10″E

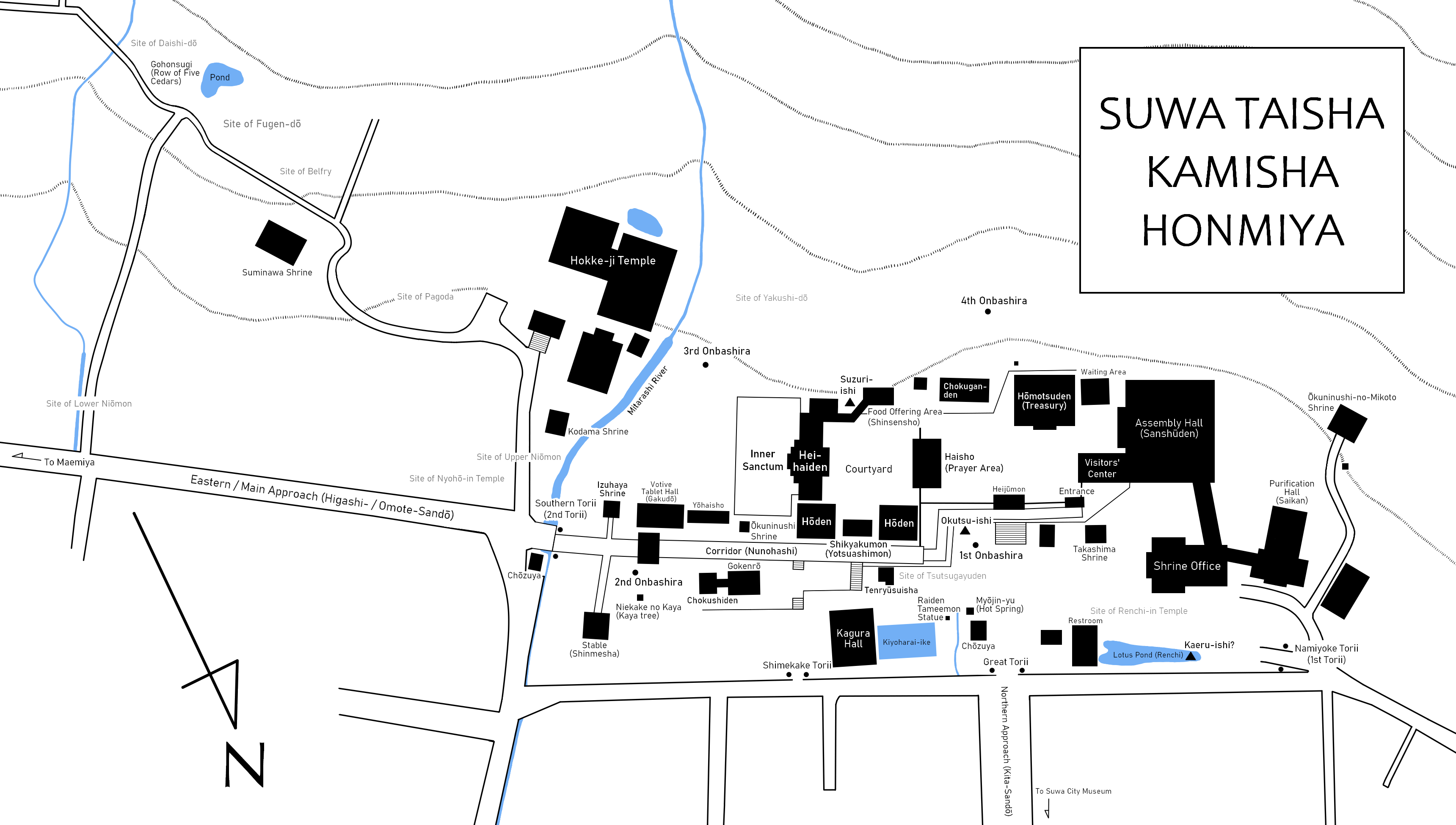
Map of the Kamisha Honmiya and its immediate vicinity

The Upper Shrine's 'main shrine' (本宮 honmiya), located in the northern foothills of Mount Moriya - currently often identified as the Upper Shrine's go-shintai - boasts the largest number of historical buildings and structures of the four shrines, a number of which have been designated as Important Cultural Properties. Similar to the two shrines of the Lower Shrine, the Honmiya possesses two thatched-roof wooden edifices called hōden (宝殿 'treasure hall') in place of a honden, the building where the deity is enshrined in many Shinto shrines. Unlike them, however, the Honmiya's hōden are located to the side of the hei-haiden rather than directly behind it.

Unlike today, there were originally far fewer buildings in the Honmiya's precincts. Medieval records indicate that the shrine's most sacred area where the heihaiden now stands originally only contained a rock (磐座 iwakura) serving as the dwelling place of the shrine's deity, which was demarcated by a torii gate and a fence (格子 kakusu). These texts describe the Honmiya's terrain as being made up of three levels or 'platforms' (壇 dan): the sanctum containing the iwakura (corresponding to the heihaiden and its vicinity) was the 'upper platform' (上壇 jōdan), with the spot where the two hōden stand being the 'middle platform' (中壇 chūdan). The 'lower platform' (下壇 gedan) where the Kagura Hall now stands was where religious rites were originally conducted.

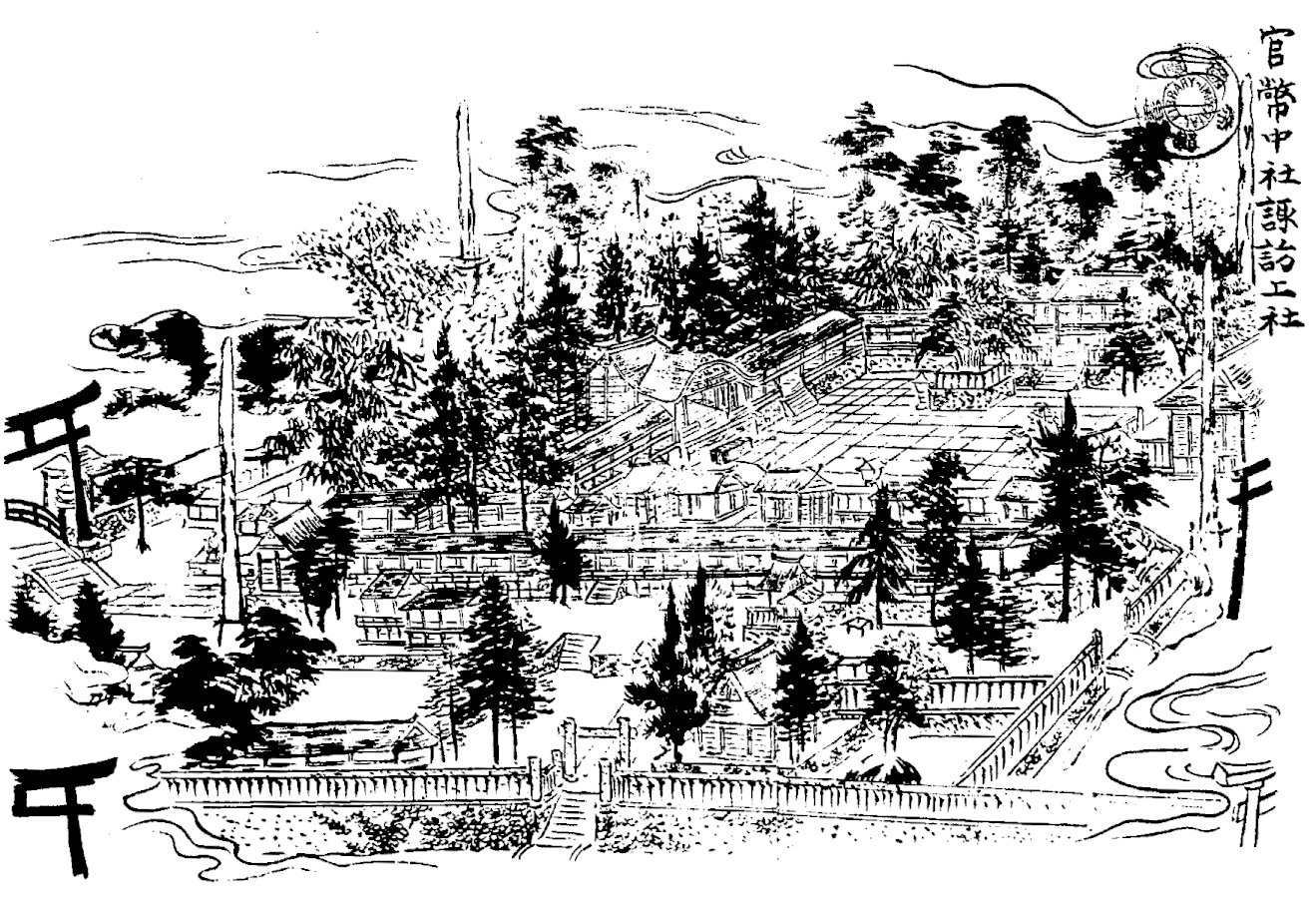
Late 19th-early 20th century depiction of the Honmiya

In antiquity, the water level of Lake Suwa was five to six meters higher than it currently is; the lake thus originally came up near the Honmiya before it shrunk into its present size. Indeed, the wooden torii gate at the shrine's northwest end is known as the Namiyoke (波除 'Wave-Repelling') Torii. The shrine is now located approximately 5.2 kilometers (3.23 miles) away from the lake's shores.

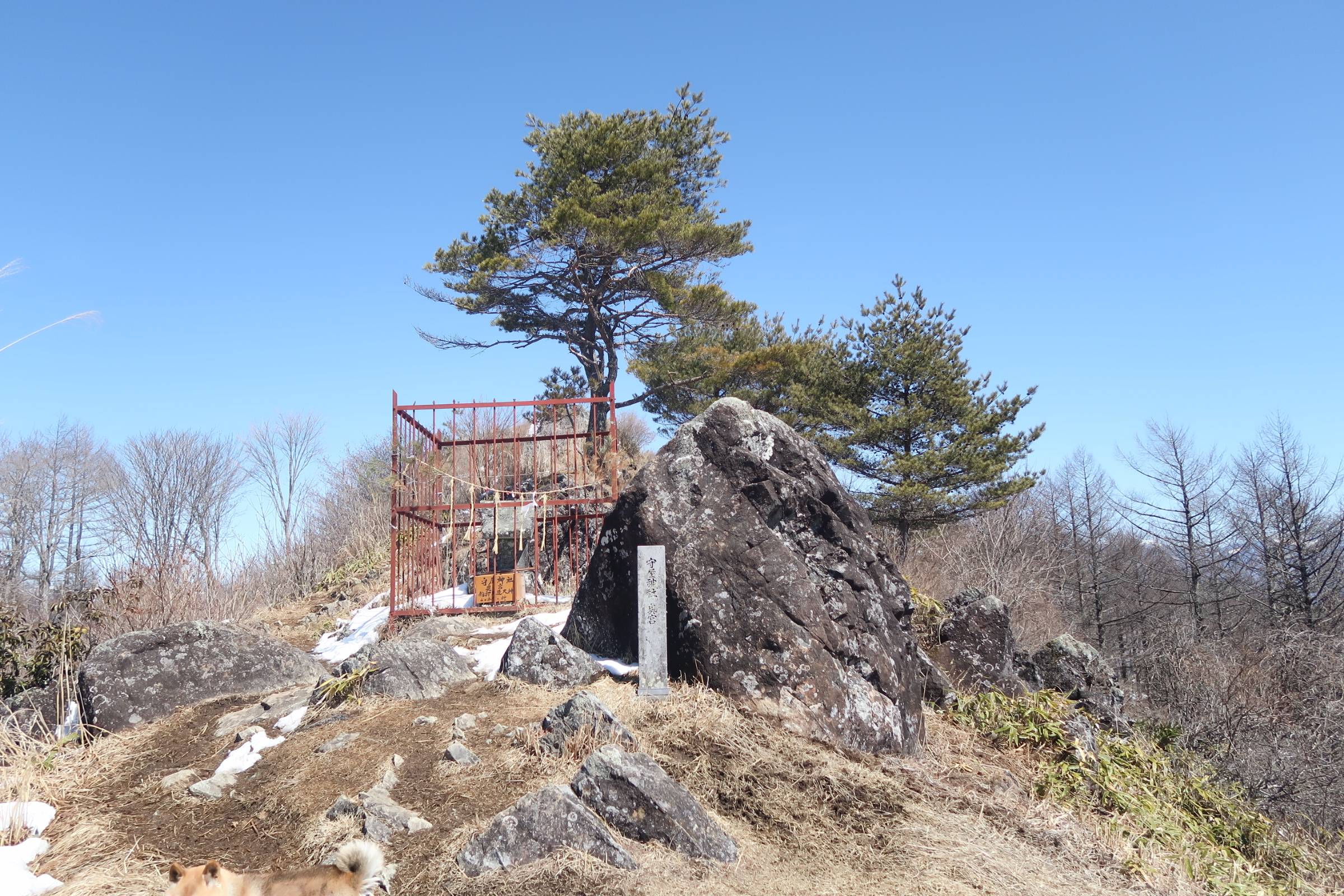
A shrine to Mononobe no Moriya at Mount Moriya's eastern peak, the 'interior shrine' (okumiya) of Mononobe no Moriya Shrine located in the town of Takatō (part of Ina City) at the southeastern foot of the mountain.

Some authors have put forward an explanation for the differing orientations of the hōden and the hei-haiden by suggesting that the hōden were built to face Mount Moriya, located southwest of the shrine, and a stone called 'Suzuri-ishi' (硯石), which is often identified with the iwakura mentioned in medieval texts. They suggest that with the construction of the hei-haiden, the shrine's focus of worship changed from the Suzuri-ishi and the mountain beyond it to the stone pagoda (the Tettō) formerly located in the forested inner sanctum behind the hei-haiden and the Buddhist temple to Samantabhadra (Fugen-dō) to the shrine's southeast. However, while Mount Moriya is locally revered as a sacred mountain, associated with either the god Moriya who figures in one of the Upper Shrine's foundation myths or the infamous 6th century courtier Mononobe no Moriya (worshiped as a deity both at the mountain's peak and at a shrine on the mountain's opposite side), historical records connecting it to the Upper Shrine are scanty. While a document purportedly dating from 1553 (but which may be a pseudepigraphical work of later provenance) states that the Upper Shrine "worships a mountain as its shintai" (以山為神体而拝之矣), it does not specifically identify this mountain to be Mount Moriya; indeed no source identifies Mount Moriya as the Upper Shrine's focus of worship before the Meiji period, when this identification first appeared and began to circulate. As noted above, the shrine's young high priest, the Ōhori, due to being considered as the god of Suwa incarnate, was more commonly identified as the shrine's object of worship during the medieval period.

An alternative theory posits that the Upper Shrine's closest analogue to a holy mountain is actually the Yatsugatake mountain range to the shrine's southeast. This theory interprets the hei-haiden as being oriented towards the Upper Shrine's hunting grounds located at the Yatsugatake's foothills in what is now the town of Fujimi.

As for the iwakura, there seems to be evidence based on old maps and illustrations of the Honmiya compound that the Suzuri-ishi was originally situated elsewhere before it was moved to its current location, making its identification with the sacred rock found in ancient records doubtful. An alternative theory proposes that the iwakura spoken of in these texts actually refers to a rock deep within the inner sanctum, over which the Tettō was erected.

===== Sites and structures =====
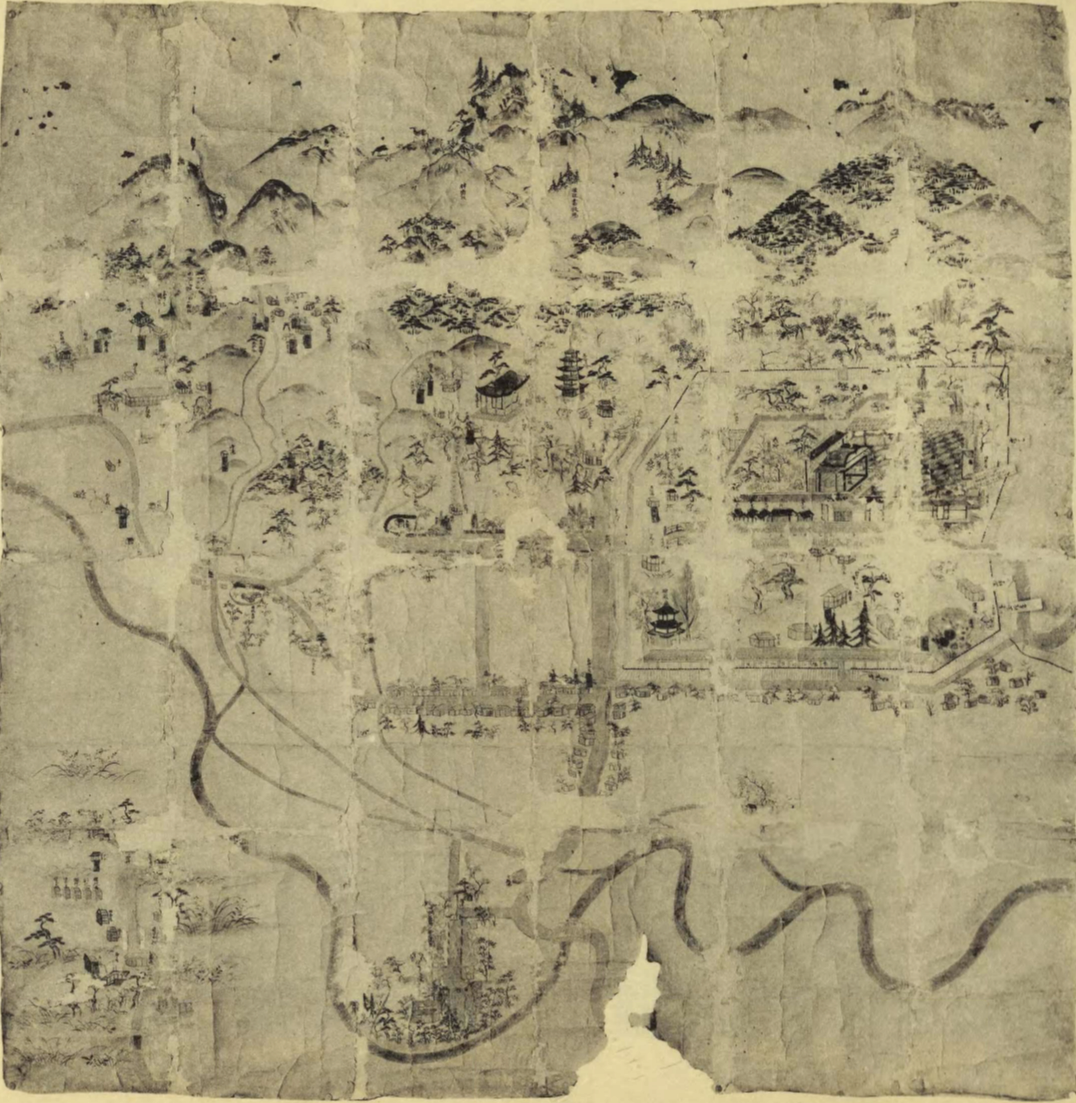
A map of the Upper Shrine dating from the Tenshō era (1573-1592) or the beginning of the Edo period. The Kamisha Honmiya can be seen in the upper right.

- Hei-haiden

The shrine's original hei-haiden, razed to the ground in 1582 (Tenshō 10) by Oda Nobutada's troops, was rebuilt in 1617 (Genna 3) under the auspices of Suwa Yorimizu. Parts of the structure were periodically renovated until the 1830s, when it was decided to replace the existing structure with a new one. Construction of the new hei-haiden began in 1833 (Tenpō 6), but the project suffered from delays caused by various crises during the period. The new sanctuary was finally completed in 1857 (Ansei 4), more than twenty years later. The old hei-haiden was transferred to Okkoto Suwa Shrine in Okkoto, Fujimi in 1849, where it currently stands.

- Hōden (宝殿)

These two wooden structures with thatched roofs are traditionally rebuilt in turns during the Onbashira Festival, held every six years (in the years of the Monkey and the Tiger in the Chinese zodiac). During such years, the mikoshi (a portable shrine or palanquin for the deity) inside either one of the two hōden is transferred to the other structure, where it will stay for six years; the emptied hōden is then torn down, rebuilt, and remains unoccupied for as long as the mikoshi is in the other building. In all, a given hōden stands for twelve years before it is reconstructed.
A segment of the hōden's wickerwork ceiling is traditionally made out of 'earless reeds' (穂無し葦) procured from Mount Moriya. Legend states that the shrine's priests sought refuge in the mountain carrying the shrine's mikoshi with them during the Oda invasion of 1582.

- Yotsuashimon / Shikyakumon (四脚門)

The oldest surviving structure in the Honmiya, this gate located between the two hōden was donated in 1608 (Keichō 13) by Tokugawa Ieyasu.

- Suzuri-ishi (硯石)

The Suzuri-ishi - so called because of a water-filled depression on the rock surface making it resemble an inkstone (suzuri) - is reckoned as one of the Seven Stones of Suwa (諏訪七石), a group of seven sacred rocks or boulders associated with the Upper Shrine. As noted above, some theories identify it with the iwakura mentioned in medieval documents as the dwelling place of the shrine's kami, though surviving depictions of the Upper Shrine imply that the stone was originally located somewhere outside the shrine grounds before it was brought to its current location at some point during the early modern period.

- Chokuganden (勅願殿)
- Treasure Hall (宝物殿 Hōmotsuden)
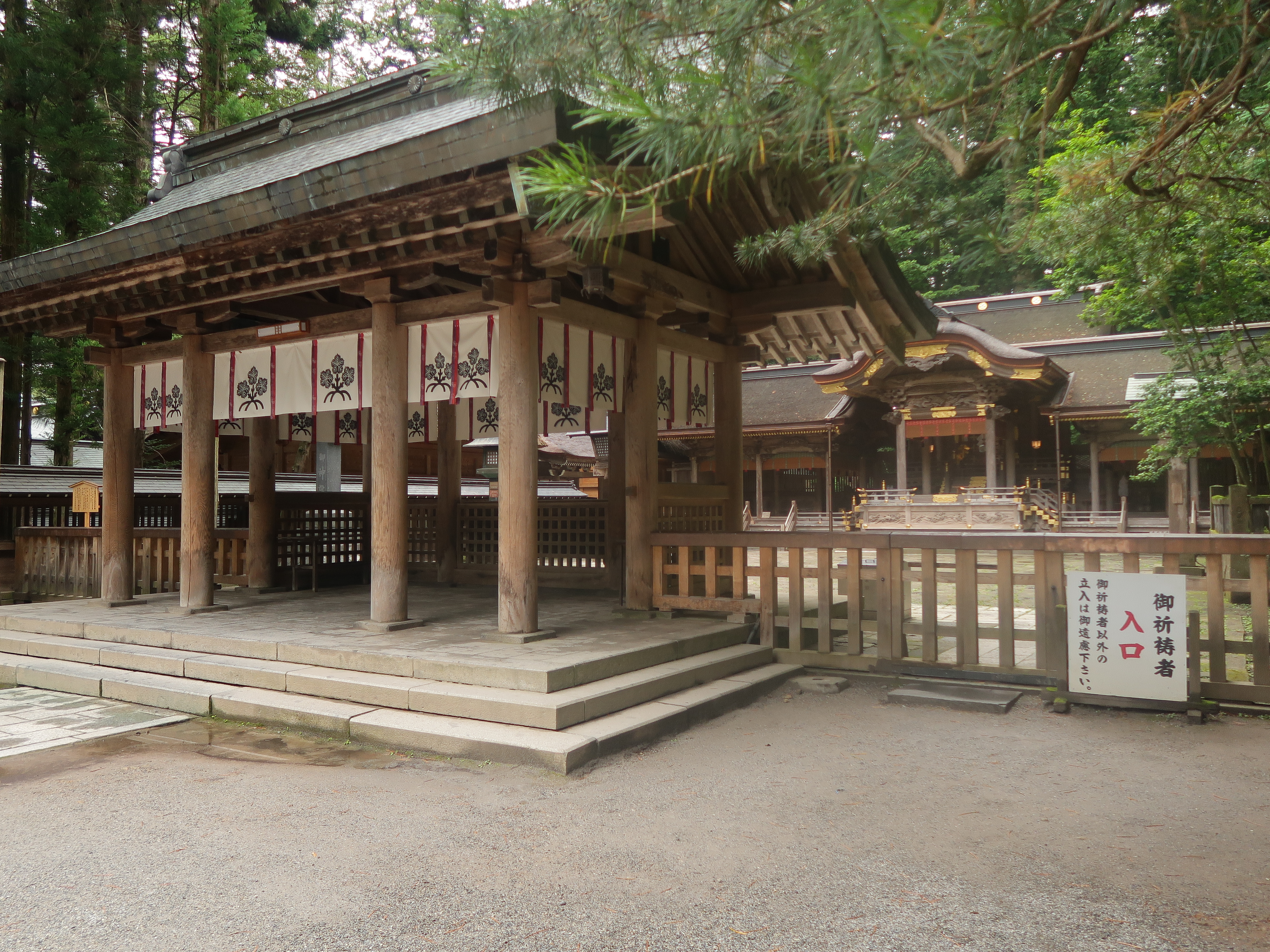
Prayer area (haisho) before the hei-haiden

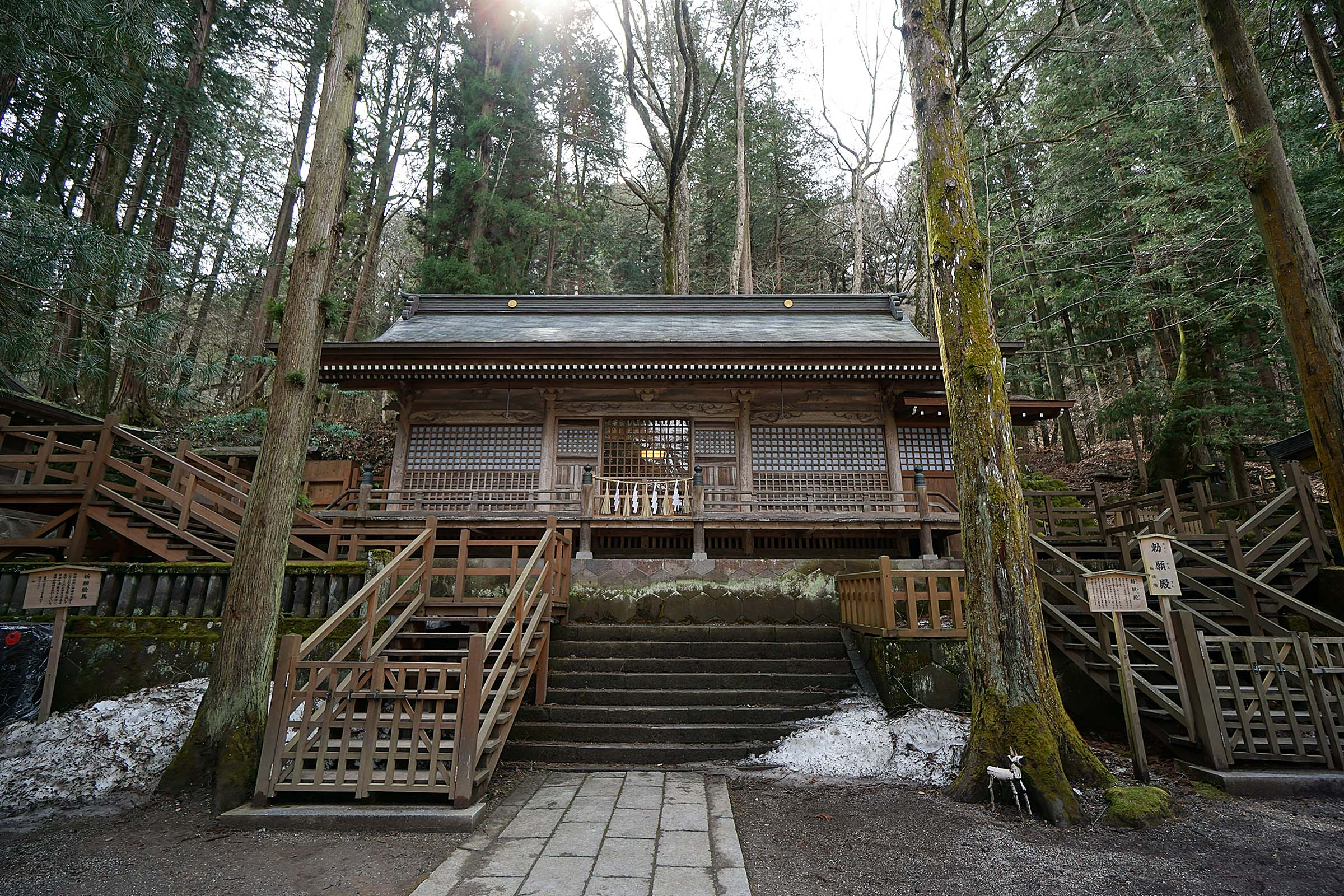
Chokuganden

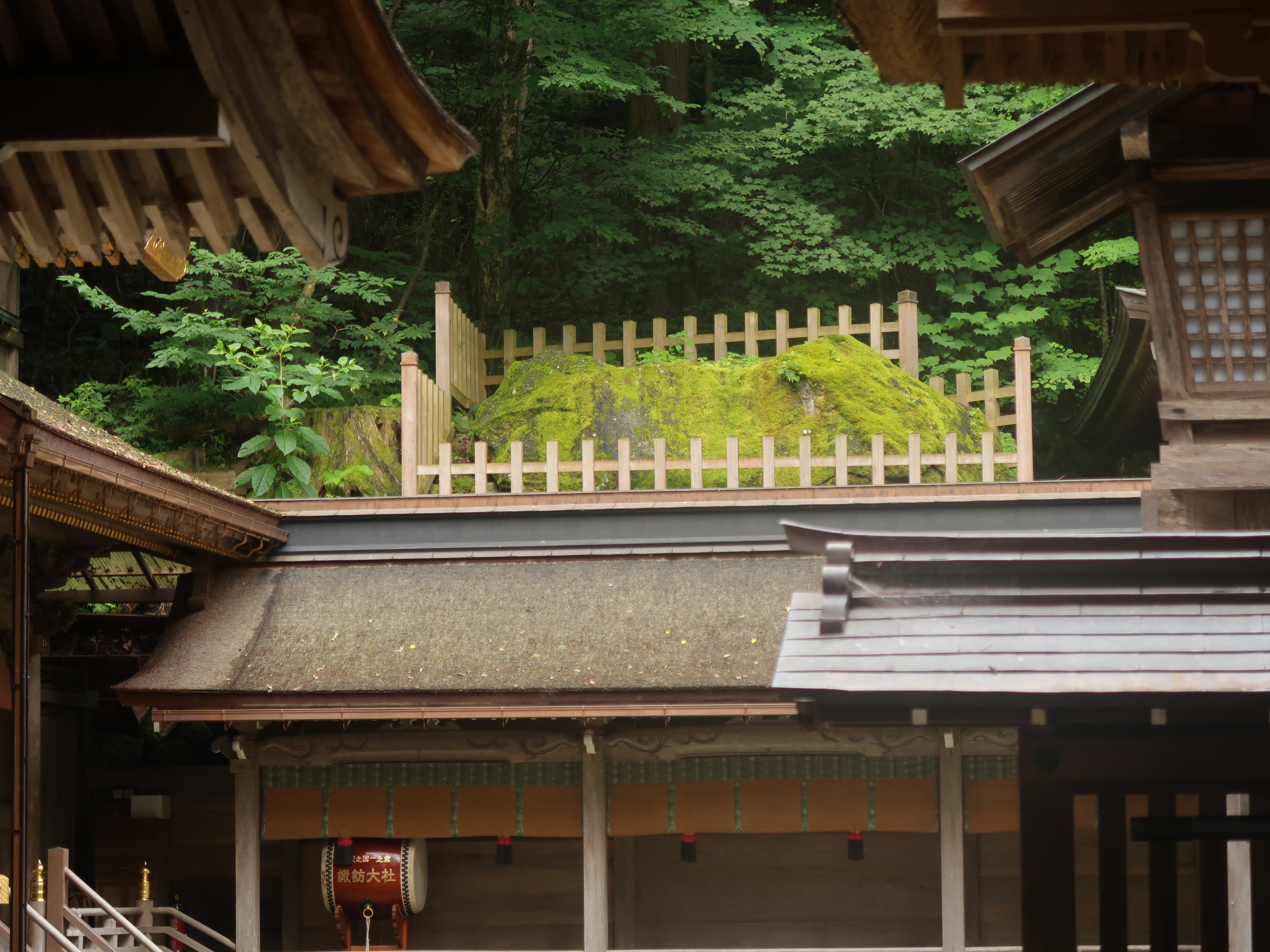
Suzuri-ishi

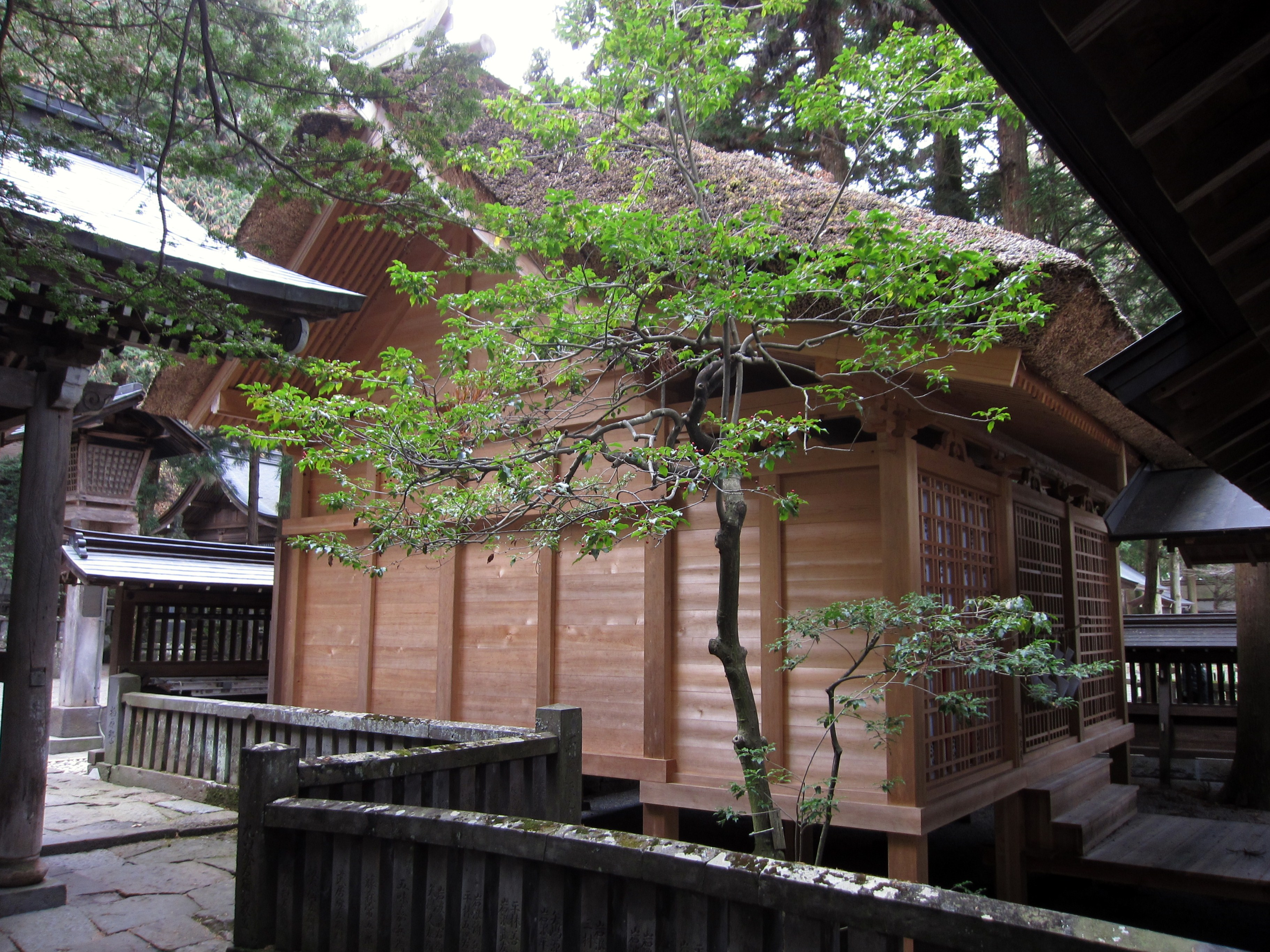
Hōden

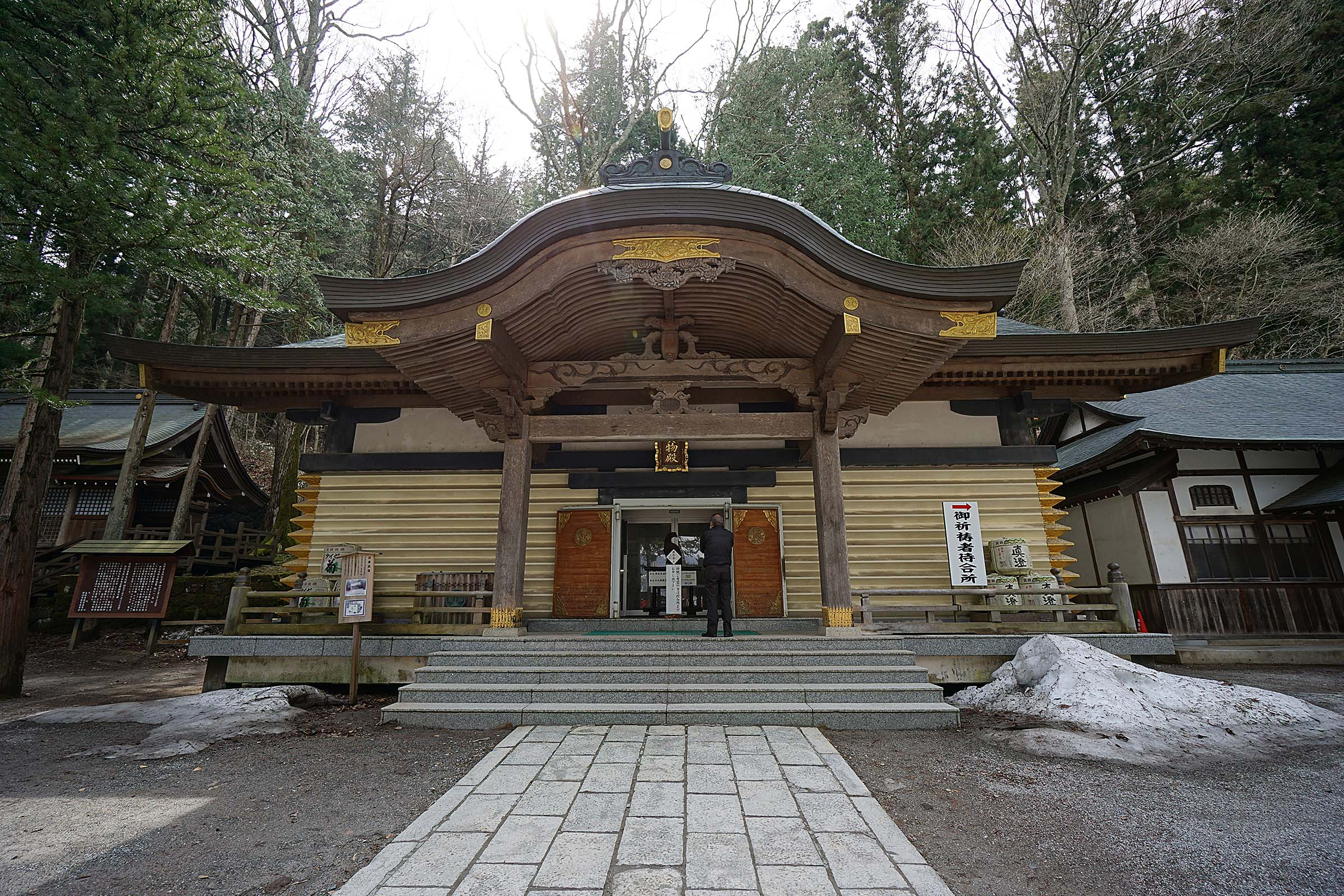
Treasure Hall
- Nunohashi (布橋)
- Chokushiden (勅使殿)
- Tenryūsuisha (天流水舎)
- Kagura Hall (神楽殿 Kagura-den)
- Okutsu-ishi (御沓石)
- Onbashira
- Myōjin-yu (明神湯)
- Raiden Tameemon Statue
- Takashima Shrine (高島神社)
- Great Torii (大鳥居)
- Namiyoke Torii (波除鳥居)
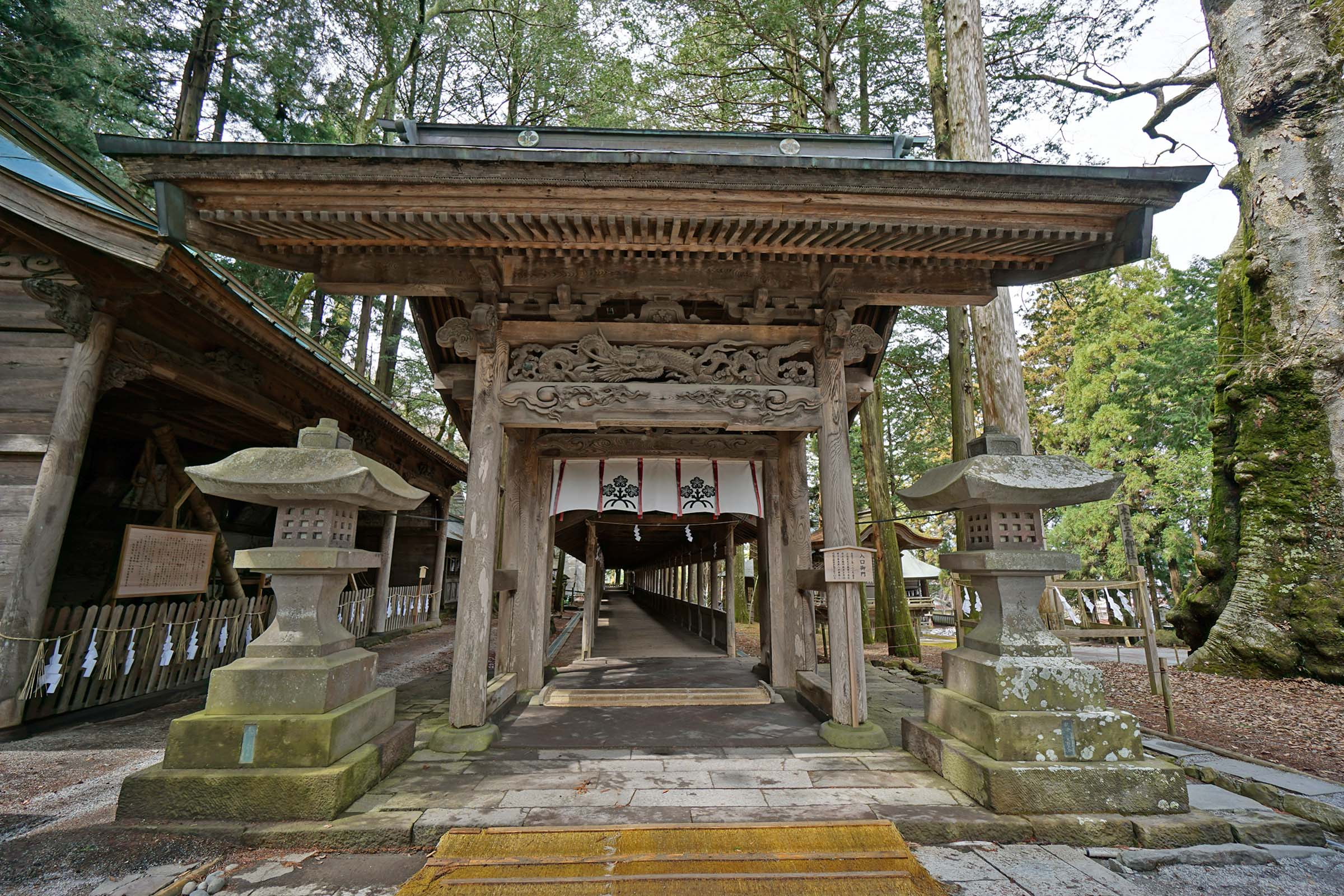
Nunohashi (布橋)

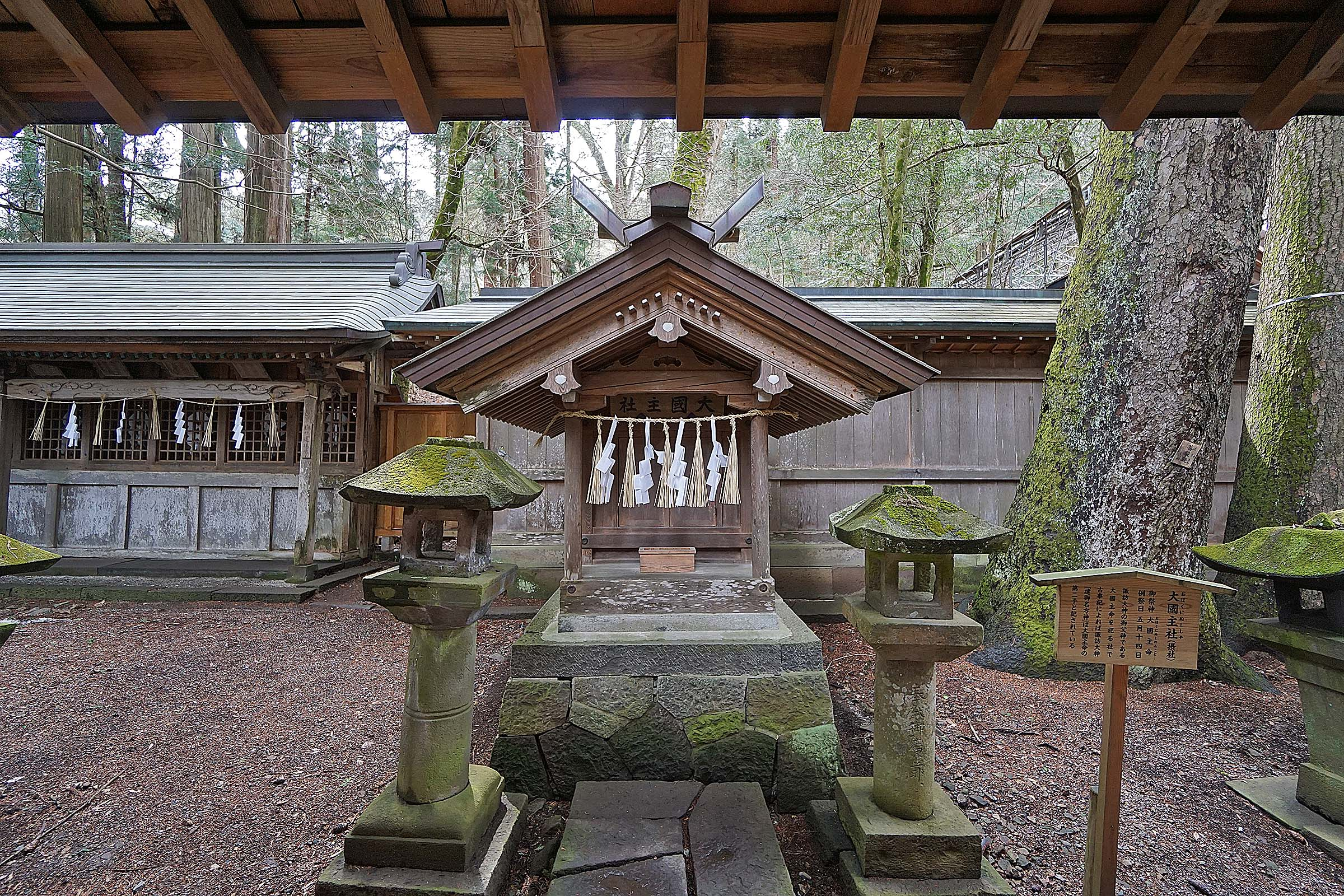
Ōkuninushi Shrine (大国主社)

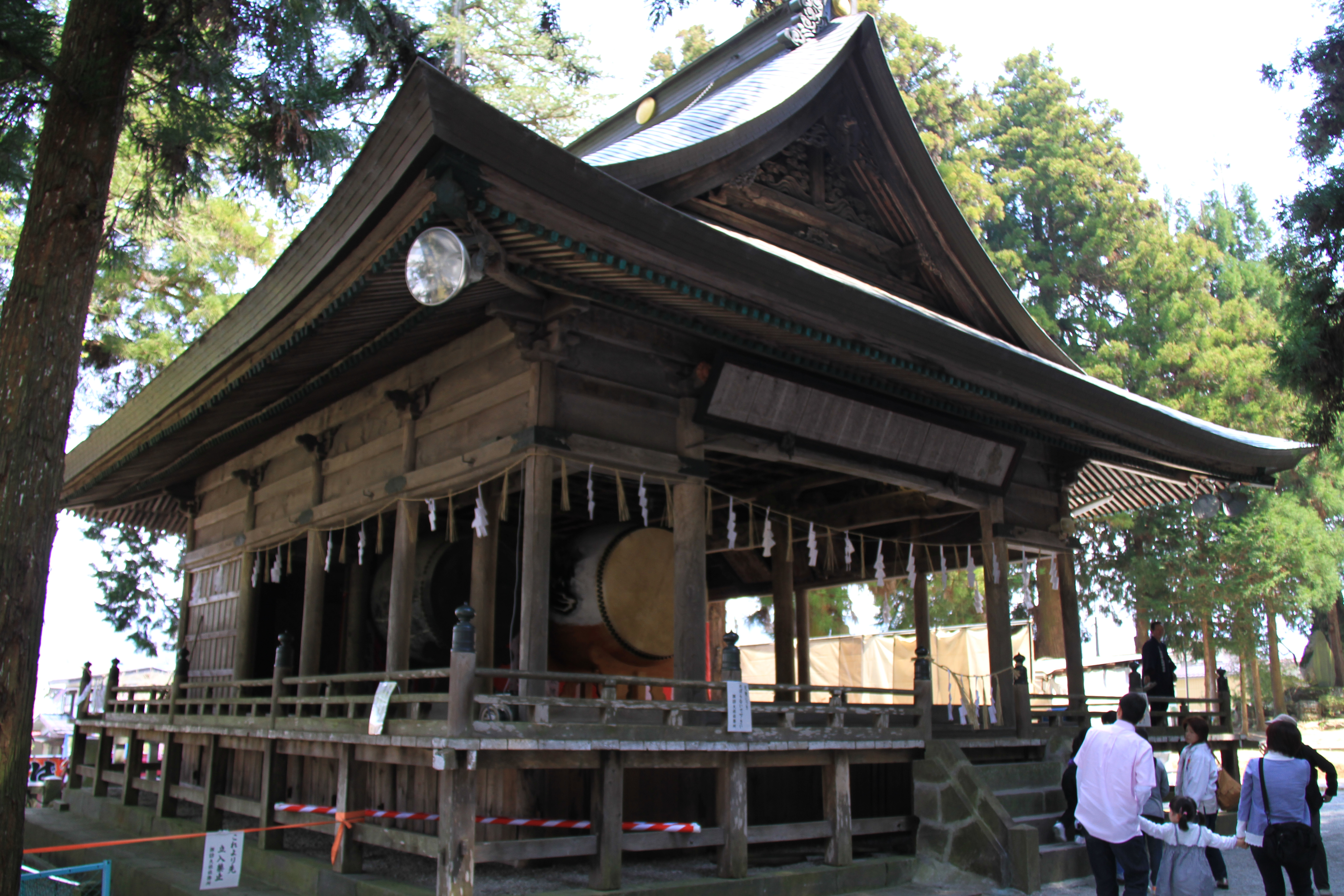
Kagura Hall

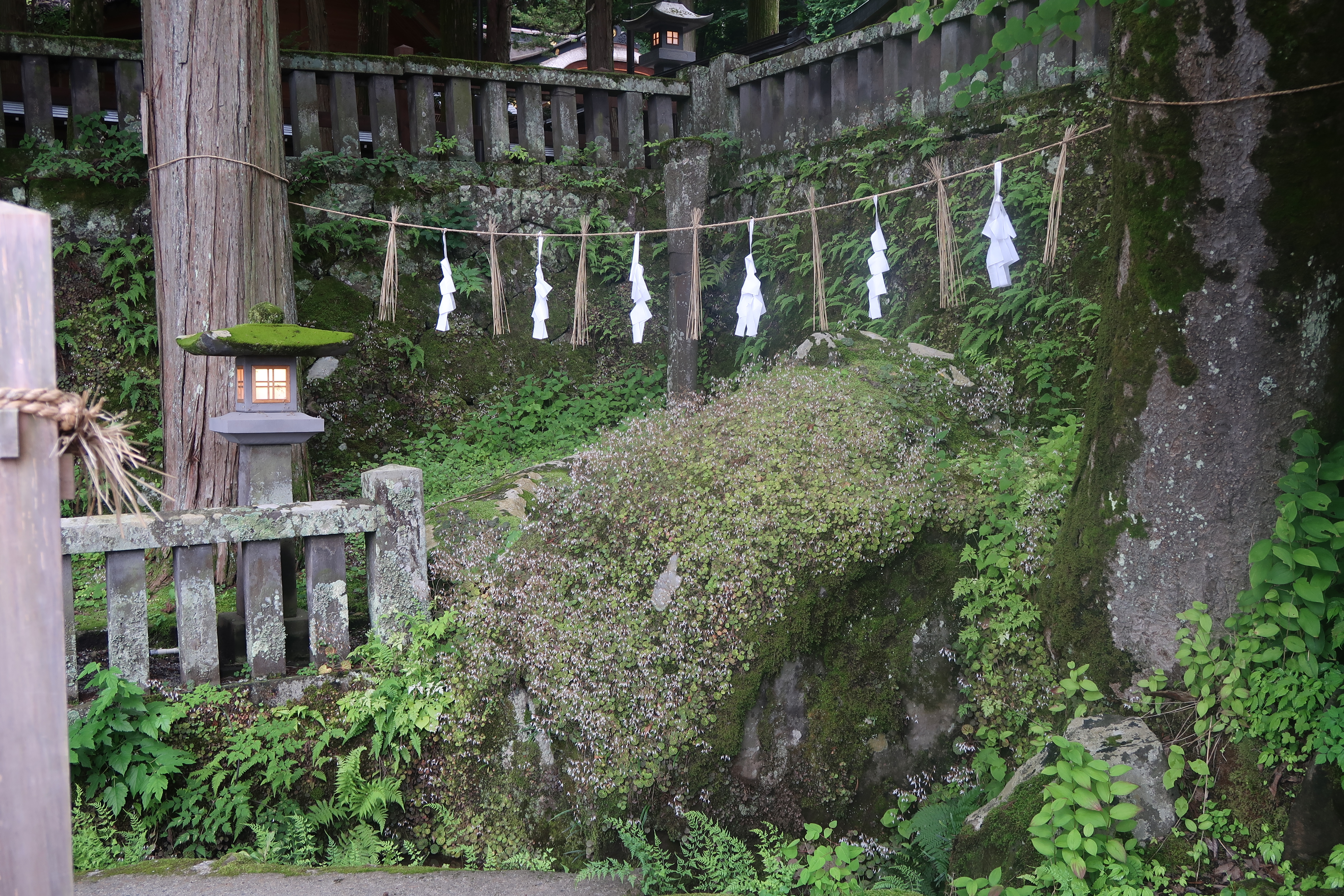
Okutsu-ishi

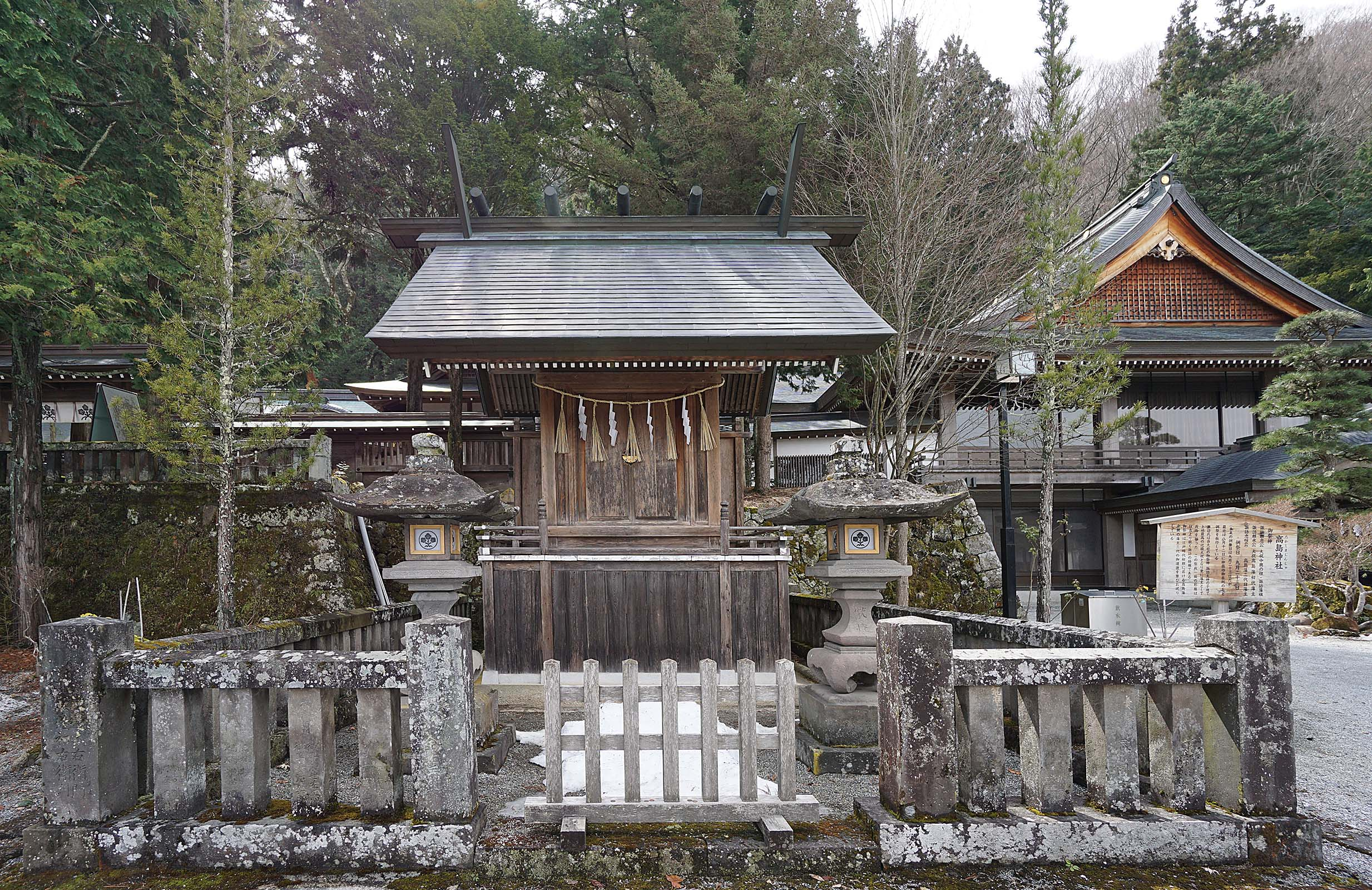
Takashima Shrine (高島神社)
- Izuhaya Shrine (出早社)

An auxiliary shrine near the shrine's former main entrance enshrining the god Izuhayao (出早雄 Izuhayao-no-Mikoto), one of Takeminakata's and Yasakatome's children. Izuhayao was revered both as the guardian of the shrine compound and a patron against warts (ibo); pebbles were traditionally offered to the deity to pray for the healing of warts.

- Niekake no keyaki (贄掛けの欅)

A keyaki (Zelkova serrata) tree situated by the entrance to the Nunohashi corridor and the shrine's second onbashira. The tree derives its name from the fact that sacrificial offerings (nie) used to be hung (kake) on it.

- Shinmesha (神馬舎) / Komagataya (駒形屋)

Formerly a stable for the shrine's sacred horses (shinme). Two horse statues - one made of bronze, the other of wood - are kept inside this building since the Meiji period. An anecdote relates that after a heavy typhoon struck the area in July 1894 (Meiji 27) and uprooted one of the nearby trees, causing it to crash into the edifice, the statues were found some ten meters away from the ruined stable, miraculously unscathed. Locals interpreted this as a sign that the god of Suwa went off to war (the First Sino-Japanese War broke out during the same month).

- Southern Torii (南鳥居) / Second Torii (二之鳥居 Ni-no-Norii)

A bronze torii gate on the shrine's southeast end, formerly the main entrance to the shrine. Before this gate runs the Mitarashi River (御手洗川), from which the frogs used in the shrine's annual Frog Hunting Ritual were traditionally procured by the shrine's priests.

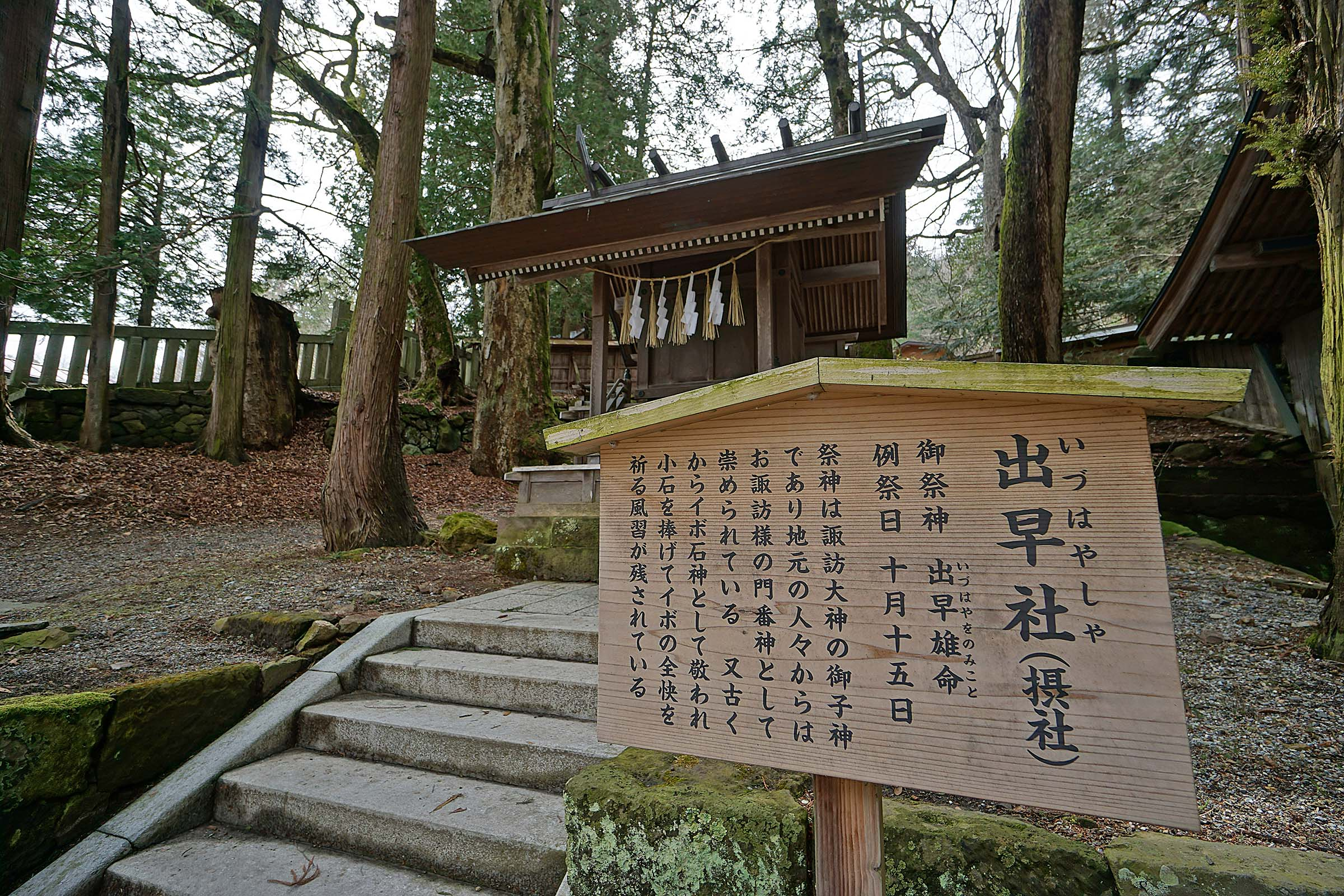
Izuhaya Shrine

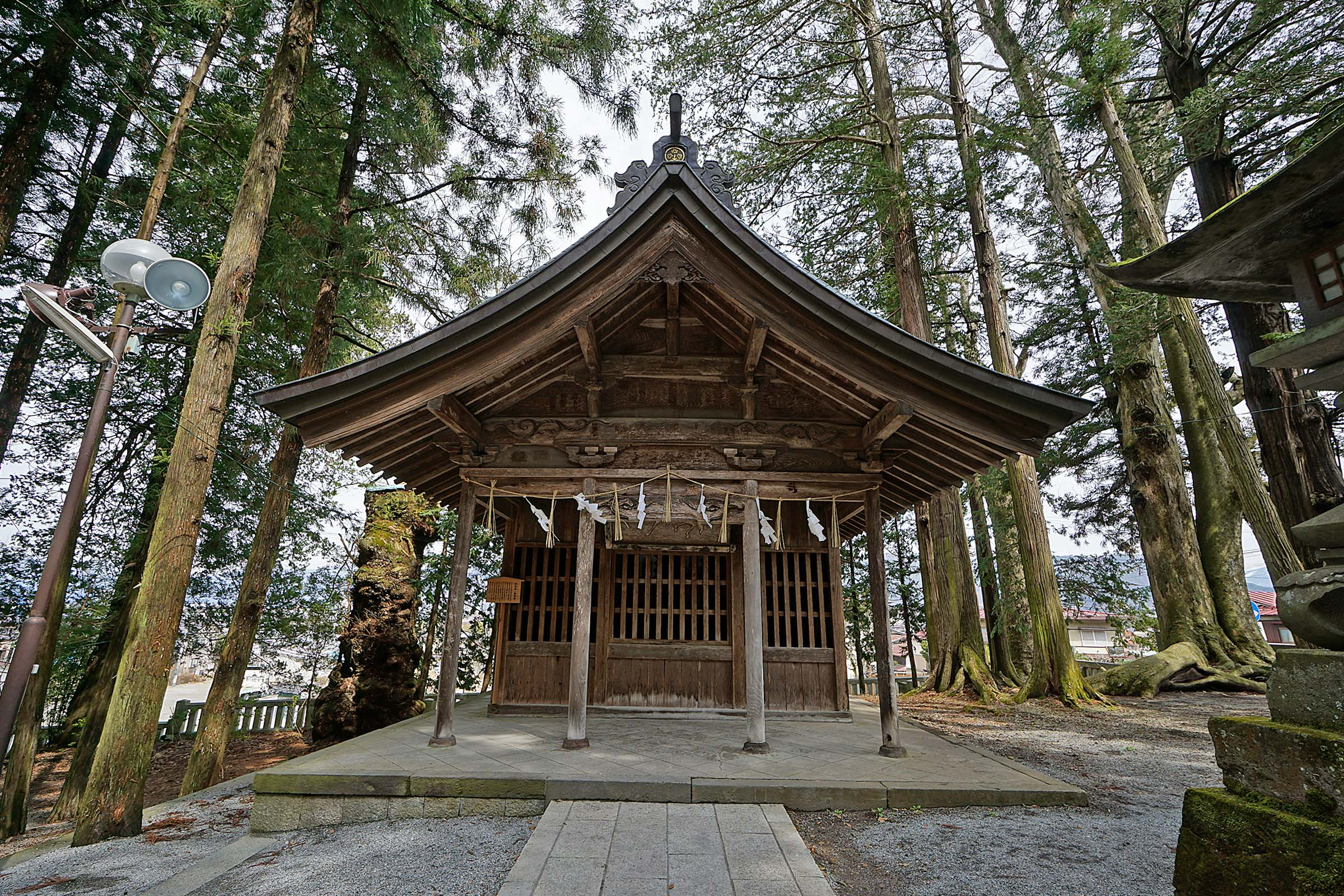
Shinmesha

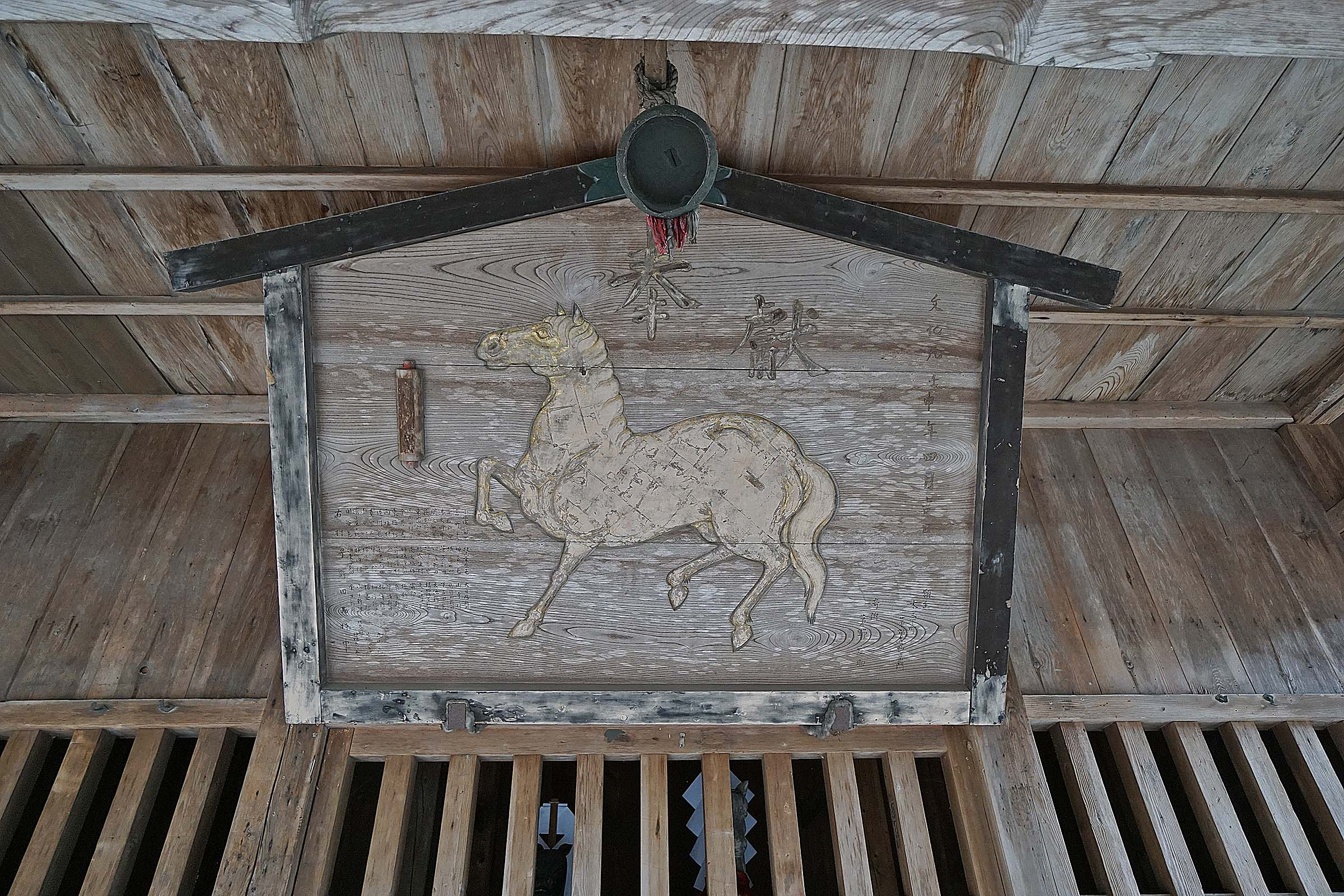
Ema plaque in the Shinmesha

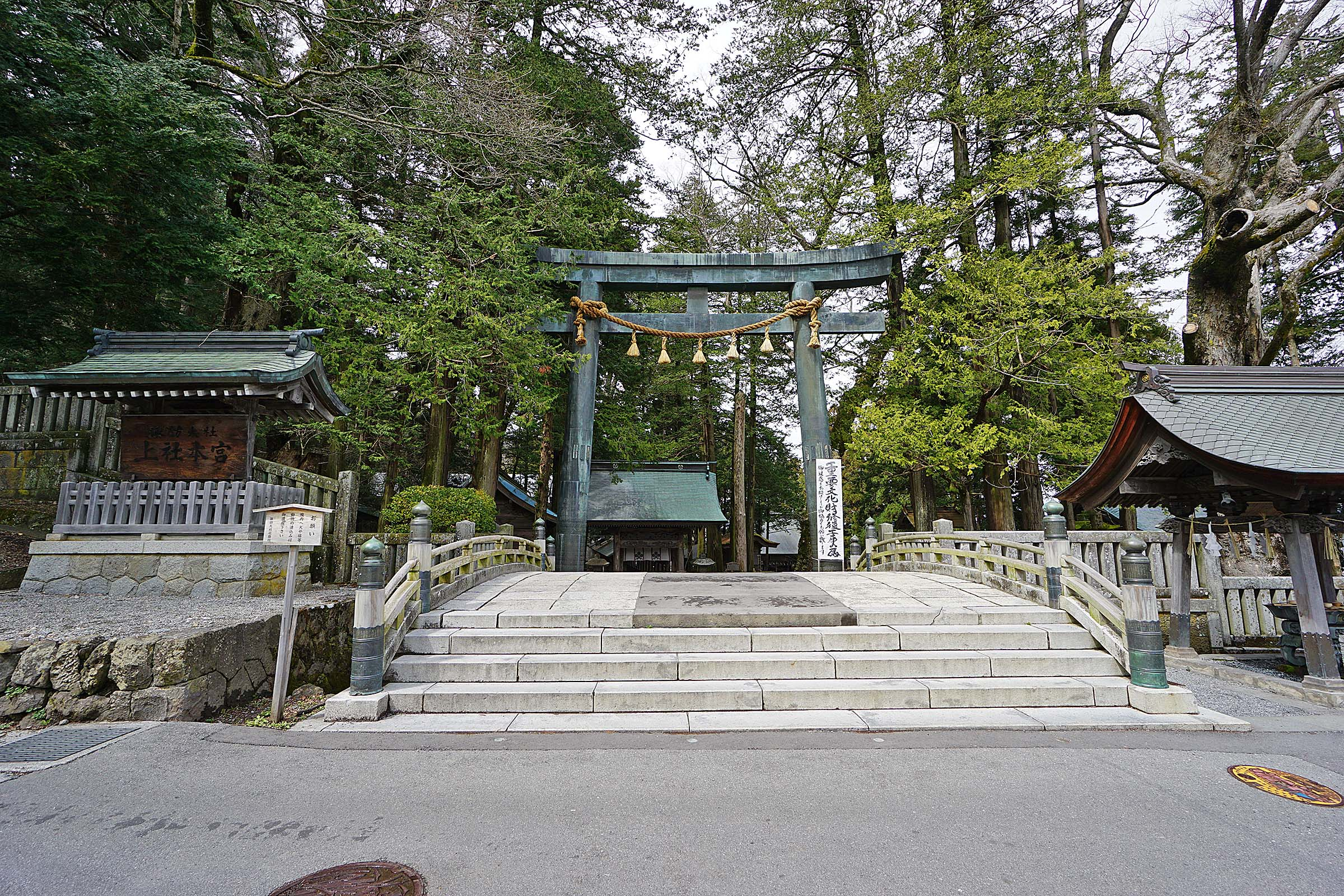
Ni-no-Norii

==== Kamisha Maemiya ====
Suwa Taisha Kamisha Maemiya (諏訪大社 上社前宮)
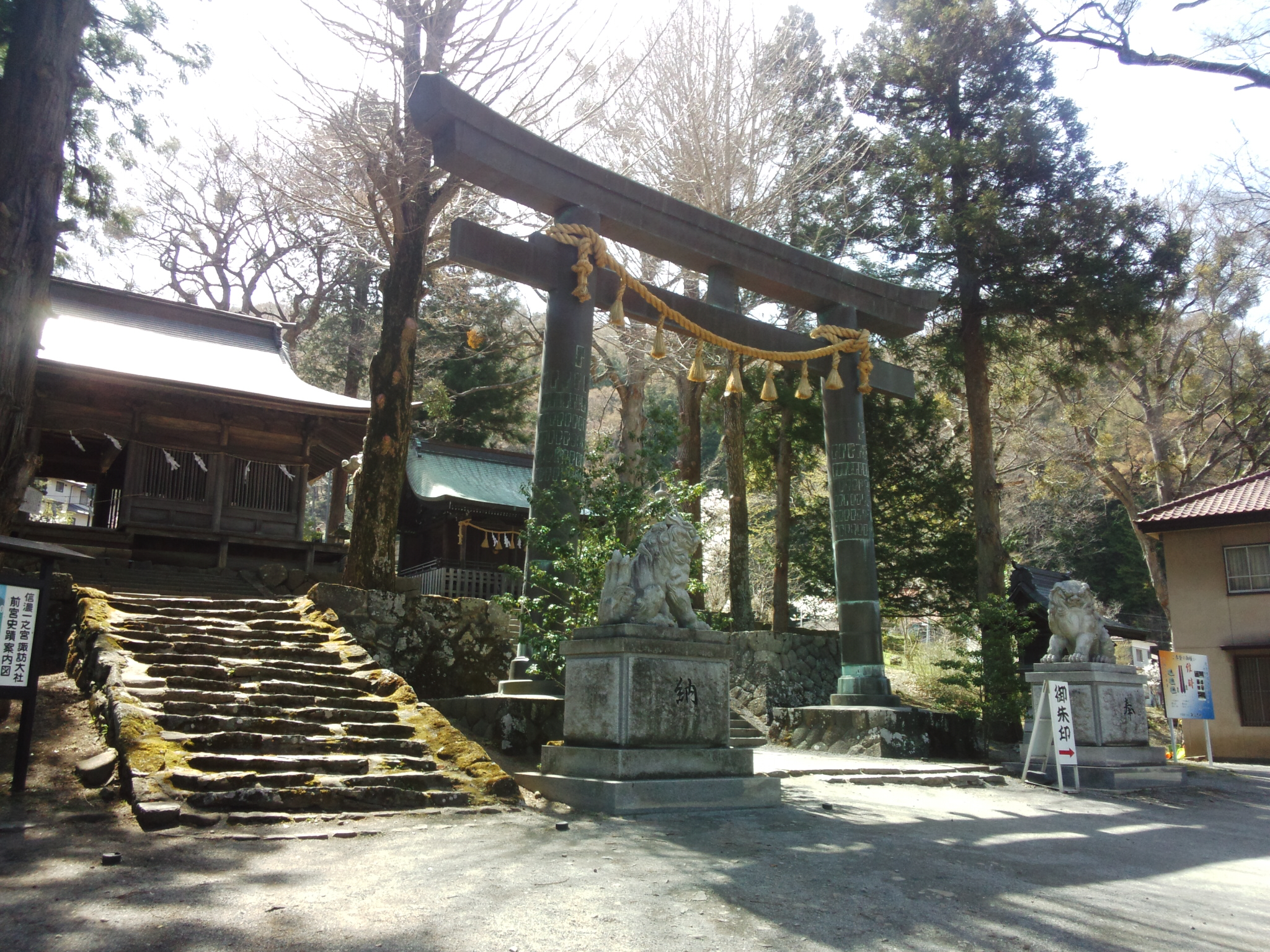
- Torii at the entrance to the Maemiya complex

Religion
- Affiliation: Shinto
- Deity: Yasakatome

Location
- Location: Chino City, Nagano
- Interactive map of Suwa Taisha Kamisha Maemiya (諏訪大社 上社前宮)
- Coordinates: 35°59′28.1″N 138°08′00.2″E

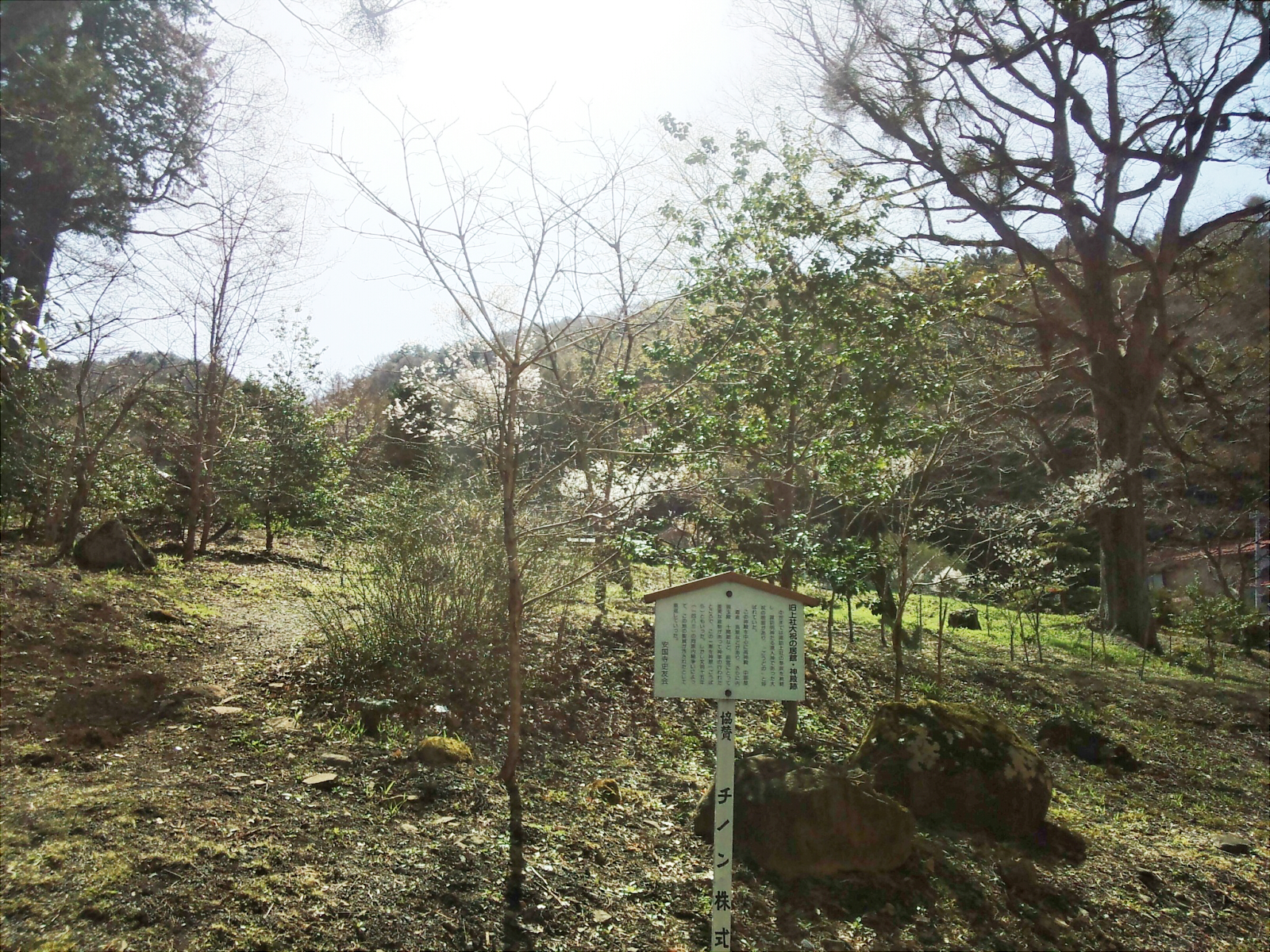
Site of the former Gōdono

The Maemiya (前宮 'former shrine'), as its name implies, is believed to be the oldest site in the Upper Shrine complex and the center of its religious rites. Originally one of the chief auxiliary shrines of the Upper Shrine complex (see below), the Maemiya was elevated to its current status as one of its two main shrines in 1896 (Meiji 29).

While Yasakatome, Suwa Myōjin's consort, is currently identified as this shrine's deity (with popular legend claiming that the burial mounds of Takeminakata and Yasakatome are to be found in this shrine), some historians believe - based on medieval records - that the local fertility and agriculture god(s) known as Mishaguji, who occupy a prominent role in certain religious rituals of the Upper Shrine, was originally worshiped in this shrine.

During the Middle Ages, the area around the Maemiya was known as the Gōbara (神原), the 'Field of the Deity', as it was both the residence of the Upper Shrine's Ōhōri and the site of many important rituals. The Ōhōri's original residence in the Gōbara, the Gōdono (神殿), also functioned as the political center of the region, with a small town (monzen-machi) developing around it. The Gōdono was eventually abandoned after the area was deemed to have become ritually polluted in the aftermath of the intraclan conflict among the Suwa clan which resulted in the death of Ōhōri Suwa Yorimitsu (諏訪頼満) in 1483. In 1601, the Ōhōri's place of residence was moved from the Maemiya to Miyatado (宮田渡) in modern Suwa City.

With the Ōhōri having moved elsewhere, the Gōbara fell into decline during the Edo period as locals began to build houses in the precincts and convert much of it into rice fields; even the shrine priests who still lived nearby used the land for rice farming to support themselves.

===== Sites and structures =====
- Honden

The shrine's current honden was originally built in 1932 with materials formerly used in the Grand Shrine of Ise, replacing a wooden shed that formerly stood on the exact same spot known as the 'purification hut' (精進屋 shōjin-ya). This hut was built atop a large sacred rock known as the Gorei'i-iwa (御霊位磐), upon which the Ōhōri engaged in a thirty-day period of strict austerities in preparation for his investiture. After being dismantled, the shōjin-ya was eventually rebuilt in what is now a district of modern Chino City and repurposed as a local shrine. Immediately by the honden and the rock below it is the supposed burial mound of Takeminakata and/or Yasakatome. Beside the honden is a brook known as the Suiga (水眼の清流 Suiga no seiryū), the waters of which were formerly used for ritual ablutions by the Ōhōri.

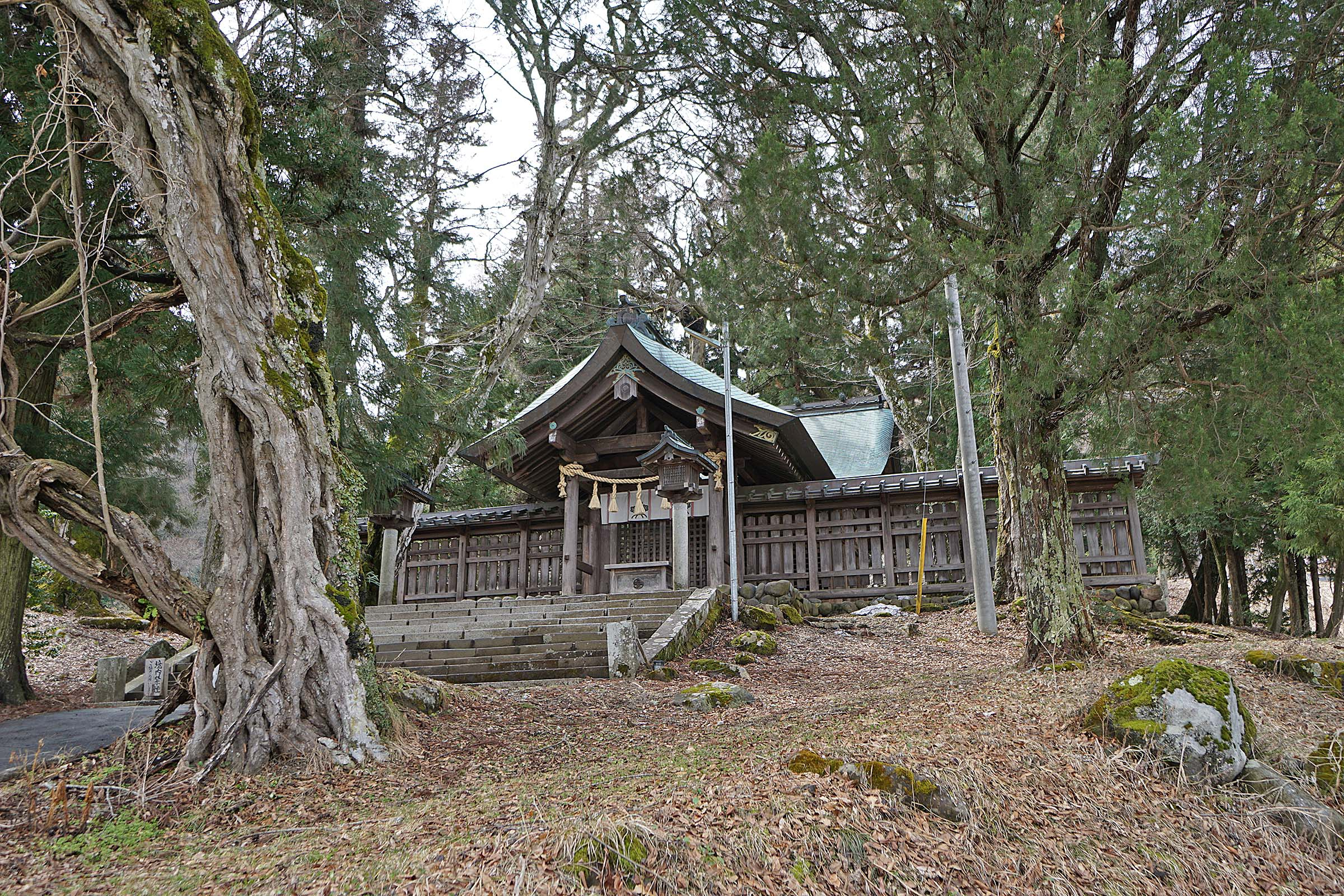
Prayer area (haisho) before the honden

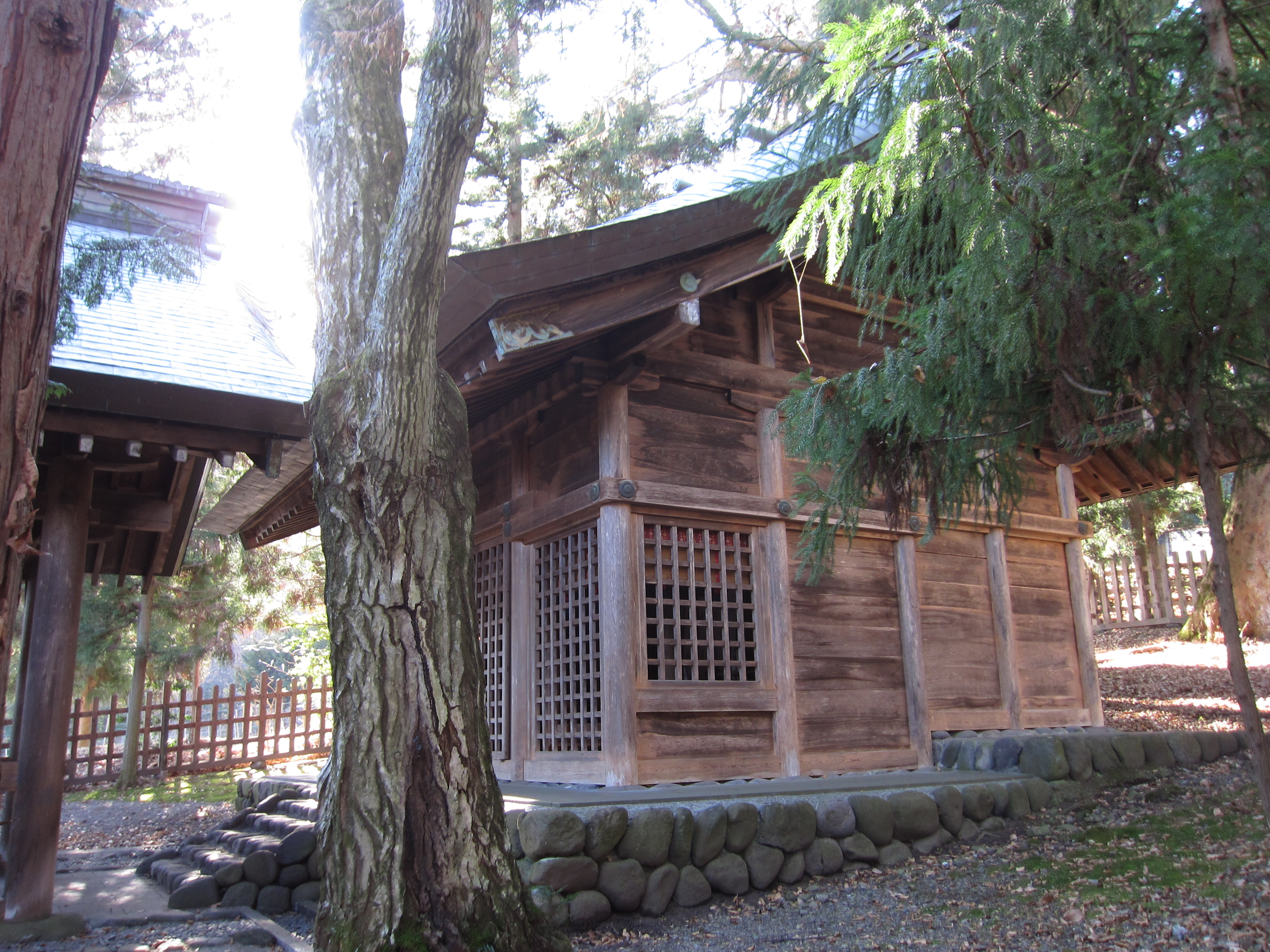
The honden proper

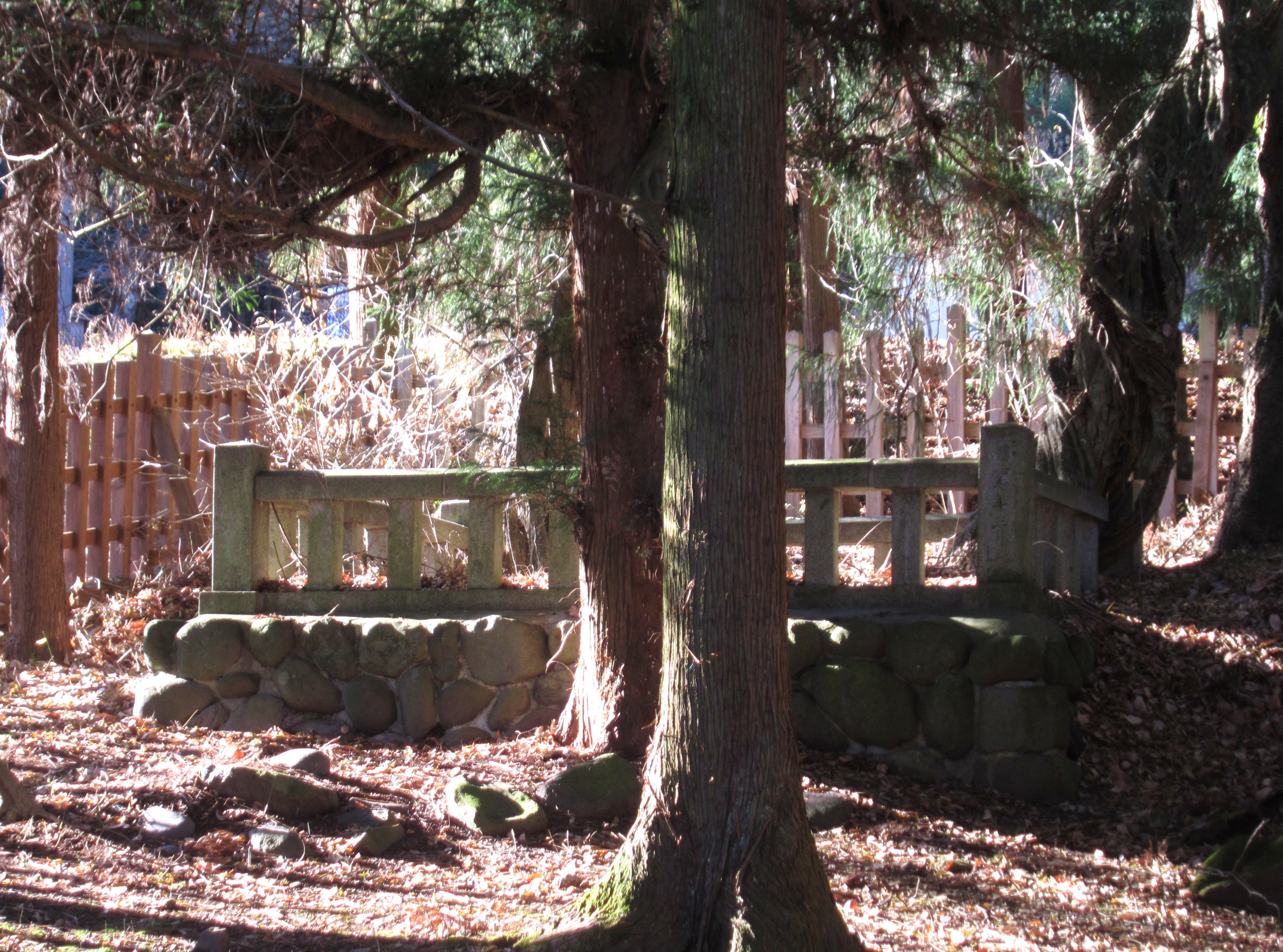
A mound claimed to be the tomb of Takeminakata or Yasakatome

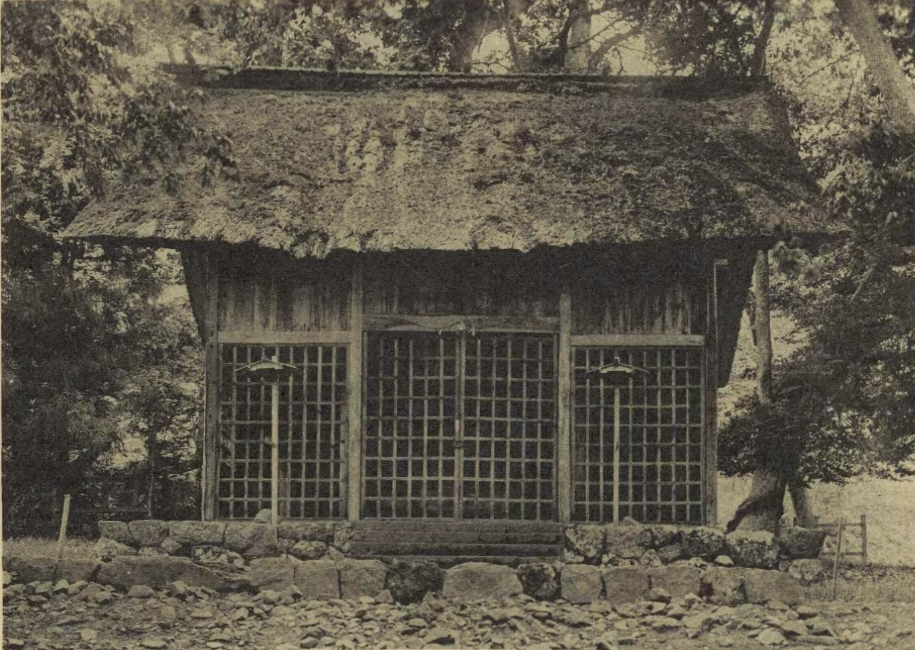
An early 20th century photograph of the shōjin-ya that formerly stood in the honden's current location

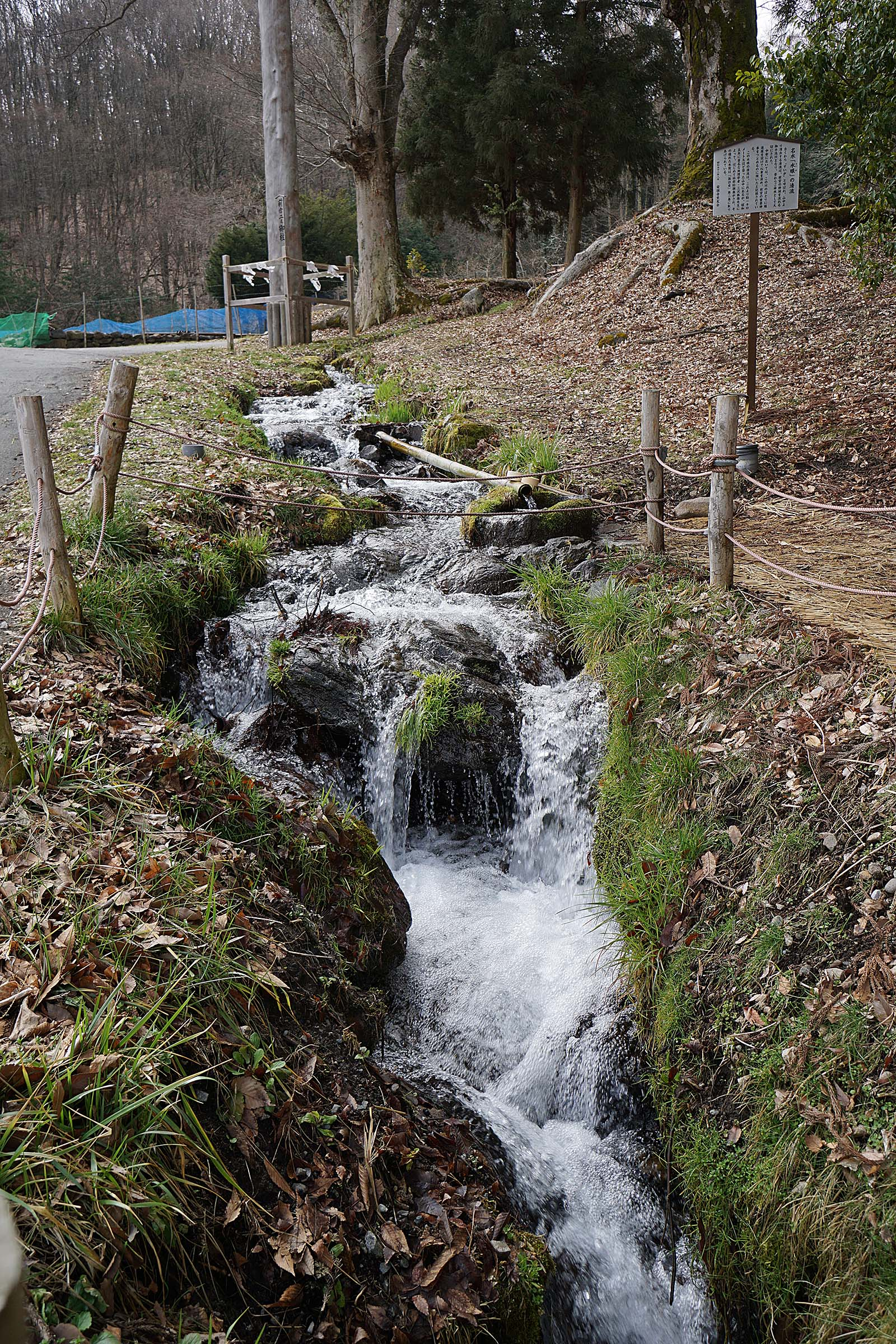
The Suiga River flowing beside the honden
- Tokoromatsu Shrine (所政社)
- Kashiwade Shrine (柏手社)
- Keikan Shrine (鶏冠社)

A small hokora marking the place where the Ōhōri's investiture ceremony was once held.

- Mimuro Shrine (御室社)

A small hokora commemorating the now-defunct Mimuro Ritual held in winter, in which the Ōhōri and other priests would ritually dwell in a temporary pit dwelling known as mimuro (御室 'august dwelling'). In this dwelling, the Mishaguji - seemingly inhered in bamboo leaves - and effigies of snakes symbolizing a deity called Sosō-no-Kami (perhaps an epithet of the Suwa deity) are also enshrined.

- Wakamiko Shrine (若御子社)
- Uchimitamaden (内御玉殿, also Uchi-no-Mitama-dono)

A shrine that once housed sacred treasures supposedly brought by the Suwa deity when he first came into the region, which includes a bell (八栄鈴 Yasaka no suzu) and a mirror (真澄鏡 Masumi no kagami). Formerly, the Ōhōri also made a ritual declaration before this shrine after his investiture announcing his status as the new vessel of Suwa Myōjin.

- Mizogami Shrine (溝上社)
- Jikken-rō (十間廊)

Formerly also known as the Gōbara-rō (神原廊), the Jikken-rō is a freestanding ten-bay corridor that served as the center of the Upper Shrine's religious ceremonies. Even today, the Ontōsai Festival held in April is performed inside this hallway.

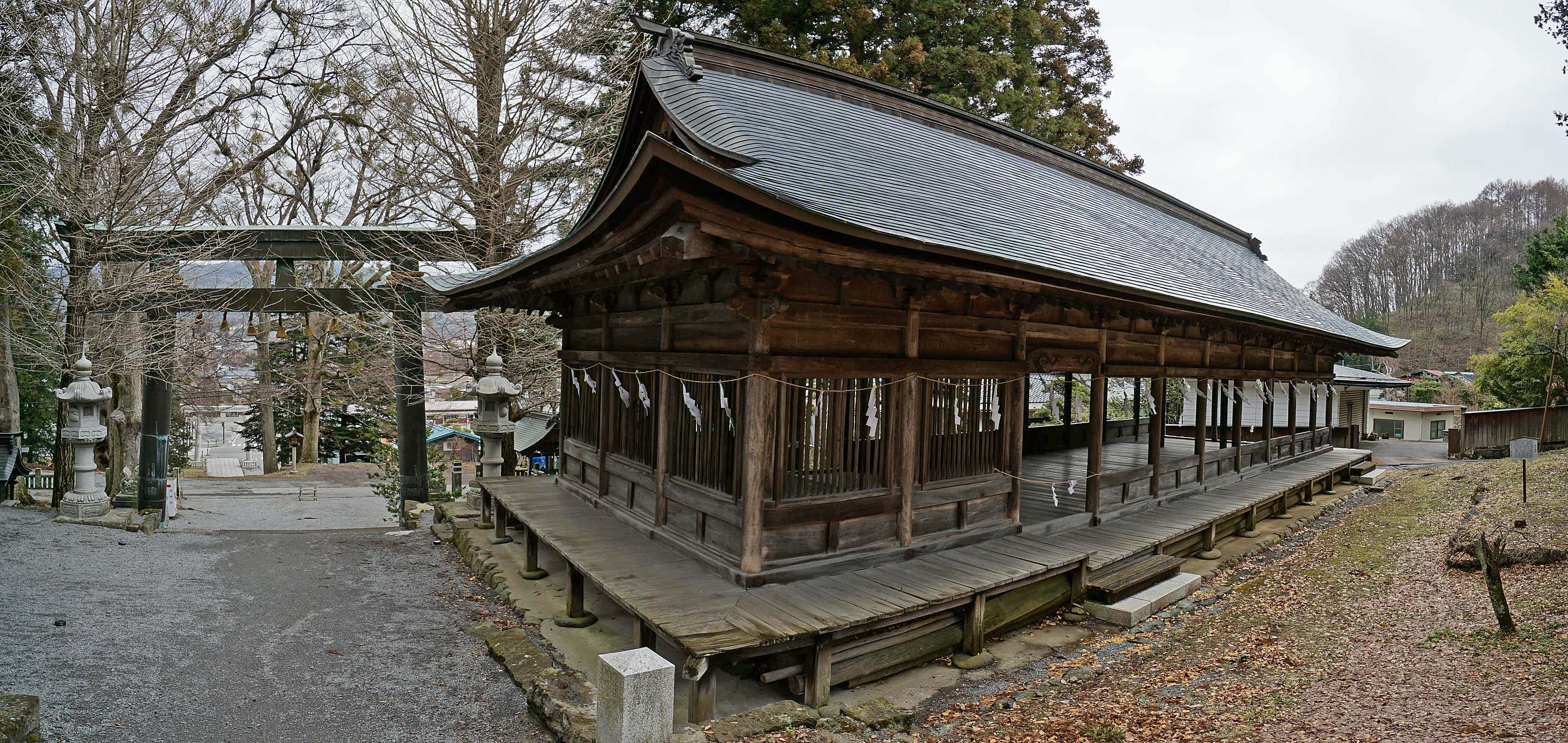
The Jikken-rō

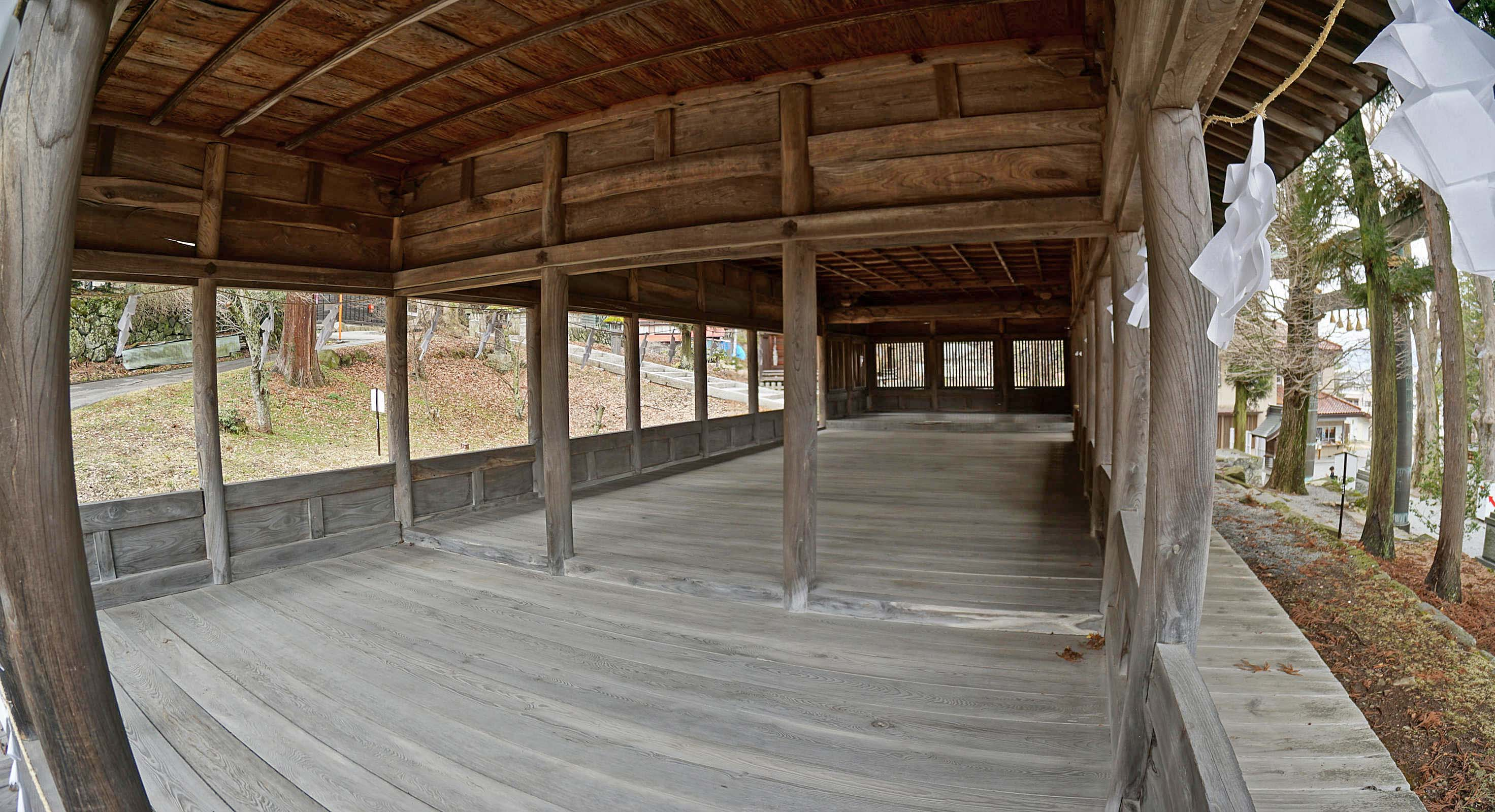
Interior of the Jikken-rō
- Mine no tatae (峰の湛)

Located some couple of hundred metres northwest of the honden by an old road leading to Kamakura, this inuzakura (Prunus buergeriana) tree was considered to be one of the tatae (湛, also tatai), natural objects and sites scattered throughout the Suwa region in which religious rites were held. In a spring rite practiced during the medieval period (the precursor of the modern Ontōsai Festival), six boys chosen to be the Ōhōri's symbolic representatives known as the Okō (神使, also Kō-dono or Okō-sama) were divided into three groups of two and dispatched to visit the tatae scattered throughout the whole region and perform rituals therein.

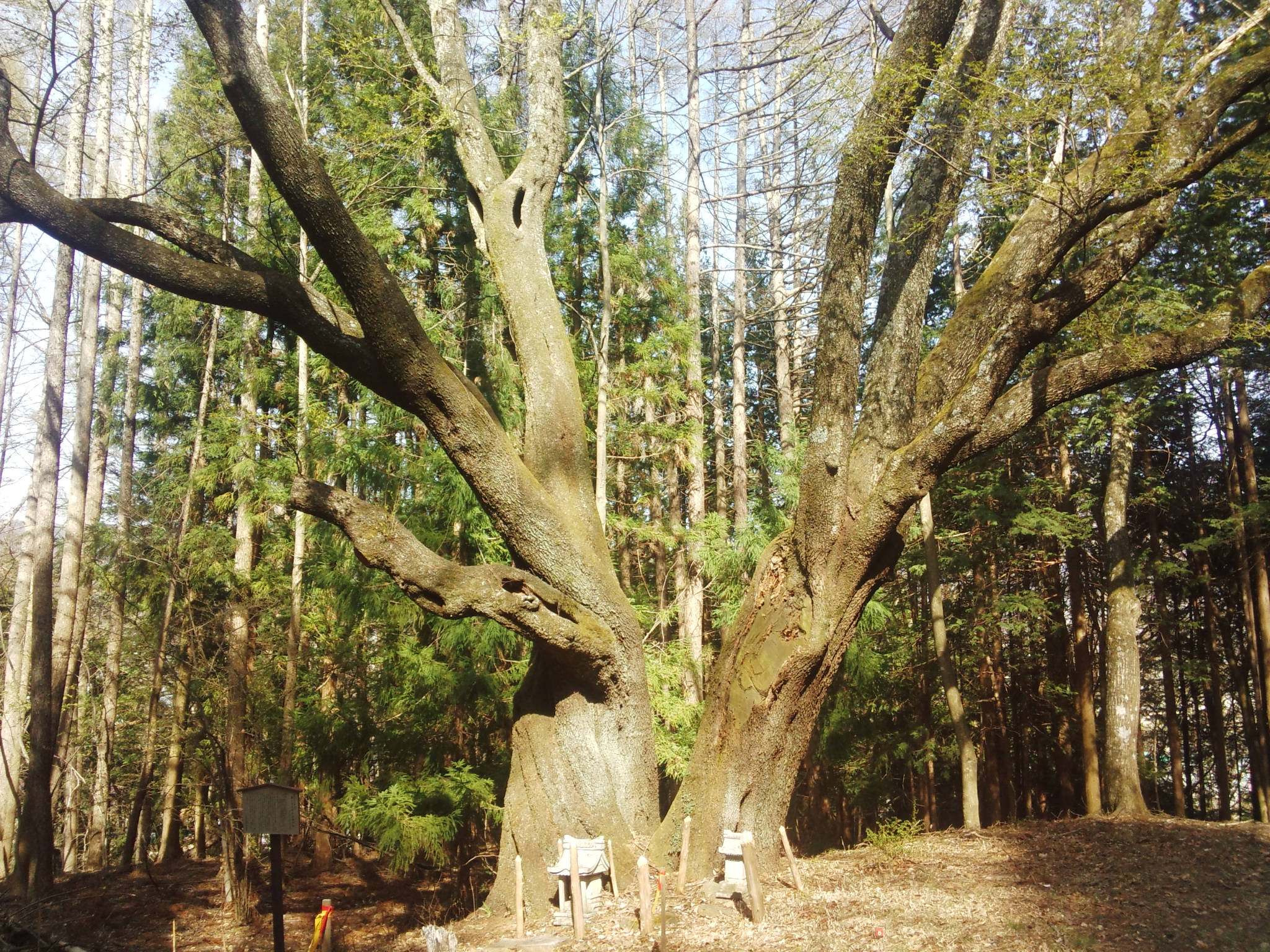
The Mine-tatae

==== Auxiliary shrines ====
The Upper Shrine is traditionally reckoned to have thirty-nine auxiliary shrines dedicated to local deities, divided into three groups of thirteen shrines (十三所 jūsansho) each.

===== Upper Jusanshō (上十三所) =====
These thirteen shrines were visited by the Ōhōri as part of his investiture ceremony.

1. Tokomatsu / Tokoromatsu Shrine (所政社)
2. Maemiya
3. Isonami Shrine (磯並社)
4. Ōtoshi Shrine (大年社)
5. Aratama Shrine (荒玉社)
6. Chinogawa Shrine (千野川社)
7. Wakamiko Shrine (若御子社)
8. Kashiwade Shrine (柏手社)
9. Kuzui Shrine (葛井社)
10. Mizogami Shrine (溝上社)
11. Se Shrine (瀬社)
12. Tamao Shrine (玉尾社)
13. Homata Shrine (穂股社)

===== Middle Jūsansho (中十三所) =====
1. Fujishima Shrine (藤島社) - Suwa City
  According to legend, this shrine marks the spot where Suwa Myōjin planted the weapon he used to defeat the god Moriya (a wisteria vine), which then turned into a forest. The Upper Shrine's rice planting ceremony (御田植神事 Otaue-shinji) is held here every June; the rice planted during this ritual was believed to miraculously ripen after just a single month. A similar ritual exists in the Lower Shrine.
  Another Fujishima Shrine stands in Okaya City by the Tenryū River, which in current popular belief was the two gods' place of battle.
2. Uchimitamaden (内御玉殿) - Maemiya
3. Keikan Shrine (鶏冠社) - Maemiya
4. Sukura Shrine (酢蔵神社) - Chino City
5. Noyake / Narayaki Shrine (野焼（習焼）神社) - Suwa City
6. Gozaishi Shrine (御座石社) - Chino City
7. Mikashikidono (御炊殿) - Honmiya
8. Aimoto Shrine (相本社) - Suwa City
9. Wakamiya Shrine (若宮社) - Suwa City
10. Ōyotsu-miio (大四御庵) - Misayama, Fujimi
11. Yama-miio (山御庵) - Misayama, Fujimi
12. Misakuda Shrine (御作田神社) - unknown
13. Akio Shrine (闢廬（秋尾）社) - Hara
  In the past, this was the site of an autumn ritual where deer are hunted and offered before the Ōhōri and other priests along with foodstuffs and crops such as chestnuts, rice, mochi, sake and fodder.

===== Lower Jūsansho (下十三所) =====
1. Yatsurugi Shrine (八剣神社)
2. Osaka Shrine (小坂社)
3. Sakinomiya Shrine (先宮神社)
4. Ogimiya Shrine (荻宮社)
5. Tatsuya Shrine (達屋神社)
6. Sakamuro Shrine (酒室神社)
7. Geba Shrine (下馬社)
8. Mimuro Shrine (御室社)
9. Okama Shrine (御賀摩社)
10. Isonami Yama-no-Kami (磯並山神)
11. Takei Ebisu / Emishi (武居会美酒)
12. Gōdono Nagabeya (神殿中部屋)
13. Nagahashi Shrine (長廊神社)

== Priests ==
Before the Meiji period, various local clans (many of which traced themselves to the gods of the region) served as priests of the shrine, as in other places. After hereditary priesthood was abolished, government-appointed priests took the place of these sacerdotal families.

=== Kamisha ===
These are the high priestly offices of the Kamisha and the clans which occupied said positions.

- Ōhōri (大祝, also ōhafuri) - Suwa clan (諏訪（諏方）氏)

The high priest of the Kamisha, considered to be an arahitogami, a living embodiment of Suwa Myōjin, and thus, an object of worship. The Suwa were in legend considered to be Suwa Myōjin's descendants, although historically they are probably descended from the same family as the Kanasashi of the Shimosha: that of the kuni-no-miyatsuko of Shinano, governors appointed by the Yamato state to the province.

- Jinchōkan (神長官) or Jinchō (神長) - Moriya clan (守矢氏)

The head of the five assistant priests (五官 gogan) serving the ōhōri and overseer of the Kamisha's religious rites, considered to be descended from the god Moreya, who in myth originally resisted Suwa Myōjin's entry into the region before becoming his priest and collaborator. While officially subservient to the ōhōri, the Moriya iinchōkan was in reality the one who controlled the shrine's affairs, due to his full knowledge of its ceremonies and other rituals (which were transferred only to the heir to the position) and his exclusive ability to summon (as well as dismiss) the god(s) Mishaguji, worshipped by the Moriya since antiquity.

- Negi-dayū (禰宜大夫) - Koide clan (小出氏), later Moriya clan (守屋氏)

The office's original occupants, the Koide, claimed descent from Yakine-no-mikoto (八杵命), one of Suwa Myōjin's divine children. The Negi-dayū Moriya meanwhile claimed descent from a supposed son of Mononobe no Moriya who fled to Suwa and was adopted into the Jinchō Moriya clan.

- Gon-(no-)hōri (権祝) - Yajima clan (矢島氏)

The Yajima clan claimed descent from another of Suwa Myōjin's offspring, Ikeno'o-no-kami (池生神).

- Gi-(no-)hōri (擬祝) - Koide clan, later Itō clan (伊藤氏)
- Soi-no-hōri (副祝) - Jinchō Moriya clan, later Nagasaka clan (長坂氏)

=== Shimosha ===
The following meanwhile were the high priestly offices of the Shimosha.

- Ōhōri (大祝) - Kanasashi clan (金刺氏)

The high priest of the Shimosha. The original occupants of the office, the Kanasashi, traced themselves to the clan of the kuni-no-miyatsuko of Shinano, descendants of Takeiotatsu-no-mikoto (武五百建命), a grandson (or later descendant) of the legendary Emperor Jimmu's son, Kamuyaimimi-no-mikoto. During the Muromachi period, the Kanasashi, after a long period of warfare with the Suwa, were finally defeated and driven out of the region, at which the office became effectively defunct.

- Takei-no-hōri (武居祝) - Imai clan (今井氏)

The head of the Shimosha's gogan. The occupants of this office, a branch of the Takei clan (武居氏), traced themselves to Takei-ōtomonushi (武居大伴主), another local deity who (like Moreya) originally fought against Suwa Myōjin before being defeated and submitting to him. After the fall of the Kanasashi, this priest came to assume the functions once performed by the Kanasashi ōhōri.

- Negi-dayū (禰宜大夫) - Shizuno clan (志津野氏), later Momoi clan (桃井氏)
- Gon-(no-)hōri (権祝) - Yamada clan (山田氏), later Yoshida clan (吉田氏)
- Gi-(no-)hōri (擬祝) - Yamada clan
- Soi-no-hōri (副祝) - Yamada clan

In addition to these were lesser priests, shrine monks (shasō), shrine maidens, other officials and shrine staff.

== Branch shrines ==
Suwa-taisha is the head shrine of the Suwa network of shrines, composed of more than 10 thousand individual shrines.

== Festivals ==
Suwa Taisha is the focus of the famous Onbashira festival, held every six years. The Ofune Matsuri, or boat festival, is held on August 1, and the Senza Matsuri festival is held on February 1 to ritually move the spirits between the Harumiya and Akimiya shrines.

== See also ==
- Moreya
- Onbashira
- Shinano Province
- Suwa clan
- Takeminakata

== Bibliography ==
- Grumbach, Lisa (2005). Sacrifice and Salvation in Medieval Japan: Hunting and Meat in Religious Practice at Suwa Jinja (PhD). Stanford University.
- Inoue, Takami (2003). "The Interaction between Buddhist and Shinto Traditions at Suwa Shrine." In Rambellli, Fabio; Teuuwen, Mark, eds. (29 August 2003). Buddhas and Kami in Japan: Honji Suijaku as a Combinatory Paradigm. Routledge. ISBN 978-1134431236.
- Jinchōkan Moriya Historical Museum, ed. (2015). 神長官守矢資料館のしおり (Jinchōkan Moriya Shiryōkan no shiori) (in Japanese) (3rd ed.).
- Kanai, Tenbi (1982). 諏訪信仰史 (Suwa-shinkō-shi) (in Japanese). Meicho Shuppan. ISBN 978-4626001245.
- Kodai Buzoku Kenkyūkai, ed. (2017). 古代諏訪とミシャグジ祭政体の研究 (Kodai Suwa to Mishaguji Saiseitai no Kenkyū) (in Japanese) (Reprint ed.). Ningensha. ISBN 978-4908627156.
- Miyaji, Naokazu (1937). 諏訪史 第二卷 後編 (Suwa-shi, vol. 2, part 2). 信濃教育会諏訪部会 (Shinano kyōikukai Suwa-bukai).
- Miyasaka, Mitsuaki (1992). 諏訪大社の御柱と年中行事 (Suwa-taisha no Onbashira to nenchu-gyōji) (in Japanese). Kyōdo shuppansha. ISBN 978-4-87663-178-0.
- Muraoka, Geppo (1969). 諏訪の祭神 (Suwa no saijin) (in Japanese). Tokyo: Yūzankaku-shuppan.
- Oh, Amana ChungHae (2011). Cosmogonical Worldview of Jomon Pottery. Sankeisha. ISBN 978-4-88361-924-5.
- Suwa Shishi Hensan Iinkai, ed. (1995). 諏訪市史 上巻 原始・古代・中世 (Suwa Shishi, vol. 1: Genshi, Kodai, Chūsei) (in Japanese). Suwa.
- Tanigawa, Kenichi, ed. (1987). 日本の神々―神社と聖地〈9〉美濃・飛騨・信濃 (Nihon no kamigami: Jinja to seichi, vol. 9: Mino, Hida, Shinano) (in Japanese). Hakusuisha. ISBN 978-4-560-02509-3.
- Terada, Shizuko; Washio, Tetsuta, eds. (2010). 諏訪明神 －カミ信仰の原像 (Suwa Myojin: Kami shinkō no genzō) (in Japanese). Iwata Shoin. ISBN 978-4-872-94608-6.
- Ueda, Masaaki; Gorai, Shigeru; Miyasaka, Yūshō; Ōbayashi, Taryō; Miyasaka, Mitsuaki (1987). 御柱祭と諏訪大社 (Onbashira-sai to Suwa Taisha) (in Japanese). Nagano: Chikuma Shobō. ISBN 978-4-480-84181-0.
- Yazaki, Takenori, ed. (1986). 諏訪大社 (Suwa Taisha). Ginga gurafikku sensho (in Japanese). Vol. 4. Ginga shobō.
