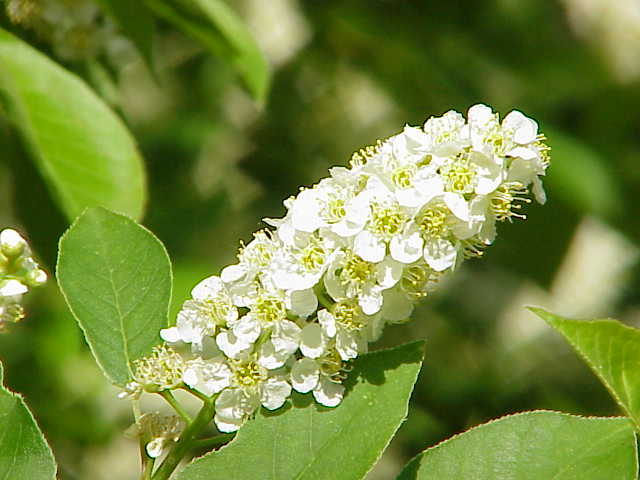
- Prunus virginiana

Scientific classification
- Kingdom: Plantae
- Clade: Embryophytes
- Clade: Tracheophytes
- Clade: Angiosperms
- Clade: Eudicots
- Clade: Rosids
- Order: Rosales
- Family: Rosaceae
- Genus: Prunus
- Subgenus: Prunus subg. Padus (Mill.) Peterm.

Species
- See text

= Prunus subg. Padus =

Subgenus of plants

Prunus subg. Padus is a subgenus of Prunus flowering plants. It was originally a distinct genus. Padus is the Latin name for the Po River, and was used in reference to the plants by the Greek naturalist Theophrastus.

== Description ==
Like some other subgroups of Prunus, Padus is characterised by racemose inflorescences.

== Taxonomy ==
Padus was originally a distinct genus, but genetic and morphological studies have shown that it is polyphyletic. It has been proposed that all the racemose taxa within Prunus (Padus, Maddenia, Laurocerasus and Pygeum) are incorporated into a broad-sense Prunus subg. Padus.

=== Species ===
==== Padus ====
Species formerly included in the genus Padus are mostly incorporated into this subgenus, except P. maackii and P. xingshanensis, which are included in Prunus subg. Cerasus. They are deciduous and have small, sour fruit usually only palatable to birds, hence the name bird cherries. Bird cherries are native throughout the temperate Northern Hemisphere, including:

- Prunus alabamensis – Alabama black cherry, Southeastern United States
- Prunus brachypoda – China
- Prunus brunnescens – Sichuan and Yunnan
- Prunus buergeriana – Buerger's bird cherry, East Asia and Himalaya
- Prunus cornuta – Himalayan bird cherry, Himalaya
- Prunus grayana – Gray's bird cherry, China and Japan
- Prunus gyirongensis entire-leaved bird cherry, Tibet
- Prunus napaulensis Nepalese bird cherry, China and Himalaya
- Prunus obtusata - China
- Prunus padus – bird cherry or Eurasian bird cherry, Eurasia
- Prunus perulata – Sichuan and Yunnan
- Prunus serotina – black cherry, North America
- Prunus ssiori – Hokkaido bird cherry, Japan and Sakhalin
- Prunus stellipila – China
- Prunus velutina – China
- Prunus virginiana – chokecherry, North America
- Prunus wilsonii – Wilson's bird cherry, China

==== Maddenia ====
Species formerly included in the genus Maddenia (Chinese: 假稠李, false bird cherries, or 臭樱, odorous cherries) form a monophyletic group. They are similar to bird cherries but lack petals. There are five species:

- Prunus fujianensis – Fujian false bird cherry, southeastern China
- Prunus gongshanensis – Gongshan false bird cherry, southwestern China
- Prunus himalayana – Himalayan false bird cherry, southwestern China, Myanmar, Himalaya
- Prunus hypoleuca (synonyms: Prunus incisoserrata) – false bird cherry, China
- Prunus hypoxantha – Sichuan false bird cherry, western to central China

==== Laurocerasus ====
Species formerly included in the genus Laurocerasus (cherry laurels) are evergreen. Examples are:

- Prunus amplifolia
- Prunus brittoniana
- Prunus caroliniana
- Prunus ilicifolia
- Prunus integrifolia
- Prunus javanica
- Prunus laurocerasus
- Prunus lusitanica
- Prunus myrtifolia
- Prunus oblonga
- Prunus occidentalis
- Prunus oleifolia
- Prunus phaeosticta
- Prunus reflexa
- Prunus spinulosa
- Prunus tucumanensis
- Prunus undulata

==== Pygeum ====
The Pygeum group is monophyletic if P. africana (possibly as well as P. crassifolia) is excluded. All the species formerly included in the genus Pygeum, except P. africana (and P. crassifolia), are native to tropical Asia and Oceania. They are similar to cherry laurels but lack petals. Examples are:

- Prunus africana
- Prunus arborea
- Prunus ceylanica
- Prunus costata
- Prunus crassifolia
- Prunus dolichobotrys
- Prunus gazelle-peninsulae
- Prunus grisea
- Prunus lancilimba
- Prunus malayana
- Prunus oligantha
- Prunus oocarpa
- Prunus polystachya
- Prunus pullei
- Prunus schlechteri
- Prunus turneriana
- Prunus wallaceana

=== Etymology ===
The Greek term Padus (παδος) stems from the Latin name for the Po River, coined in reference to the plants by the Greek father of botany, Theophrastus, meaning "from the River Po".
