= Pygeum =

Pygeum may refer to:

- Pygeum, a former genus of plants, now a subgenus of the genus Prunus
- The extract of Prunus africana, African cherry tree, formerly known as Pygeum africanum
