= Prunus arborea =

Conservation status
- Least Concern (IUCN 3.1)

Scientific classification
- Kingdom: Plantae
- Clade: Tracheophytes
- Clade: Angiosperms
- Clade: Eudicots
- Clade: Rosids
- Order: Rosales
- Family: Rosaceae
- Genus: Prunus
- Subgenus: Prunus subg. Padus
- Species: P. arborea

Binomial name
- Prunus arborea (Blume) Kalkman

Varieties
- List: Prunus arborea var. alticola Kalkman; Prunus arborea var. arborea; Prunus arborea var. densa (King) Kalkman; Prunus arborea var. montana (Hook.f.) Kalkman; Prunus arborea var. robusta (Koord. & Valeton) Kalkman; Prunus arborea var. stipulacea (King) Kalkman

Synonyms
- List Prunus arborea (Blume) Kalkman: Polydontia arborea Blume; Polystorthia arboreum (Blume) Hassk.; Pygeum arboreum (Blume) Blume; Pygeum blumei Teijsm. & Binn.; Pygeum griffithii Koehne; Pygeum persimile Kurz; Prunus arborea var. alticola Kalkman: Pygeum arboreum var. alticolum (Kalkman); Prunus arborea var. arborea: Digaster sumatranus Miq.; Parinari euadenia Kosterm.; Pygeum arboreum Müll.Berol.; Pygeum arboreum var. arboreum; Pygeum blumei var. amplificatum Koehne; Pygeum diospyrophyllum Koehne; Pygeum euphlebium Merr.; Pygeum floribundum Koehne; Pygeum intermedium King; Pygeum junghuhnii Koehne; Pygeum merrillianum Koehne; Pygeum parviflorum Teijsm. & Binn.; Pygeum parviflorum var. genuinum Koord. & Valeton; Pygeum parviflorum var. lanceolatum Koord. & Valeton; Pygeum pilinospermum Koehne; Pygeum sericeum var. denudatum Koehne; Pygeum sumatranum (Miq.) Miq.; Pyrus scabiosa Noronha; Prunus arborea var. densa (King) Kalkman: Pygeum arboreum var. densum (King); Pygeum ovalifolium King; Pygeum parviflorum var. densum King; Pygeum patens Ridl.; Pygeum rubiginosum Ridl.; Pygeum sericeum Koehne; Prunus arborea var. montana (Hook.f.) Kalkman: Aporosa incisa Airy Shaw; Prunus arborea subsp. montana (Hook.f.) Kalkman; Prunus topengii (Merr.) J.Wen & L.Zhao; Pygeum affine Merr.; Pygeum anomalum Koehne; Pygeum arboreum Endl.; Pygeum arboreum Endl. ex Kurz; Pygeum arboreum var. montanum (Hook.f.); Pygeum atrovillosum J.E.Vidal; Pygeum bachmaense J.E.Vidal; Pygeum brachybotrys Merr.; Pygeum capitellatum Hook.f.; Pygeum ciliatum Koehne; Pygeum donaiense J.E.Vidal; Pygeum donaiense var. crassistylum J.E.Vidal; Pygeum ferreum Craib; Pygeum henryi Dunn; Pygeum laxiflorum Merr. ex H.L.Li; Pygeum montanum Hook.f.; Pygeum ocellatum Koehne; Pygeum parreauanum Pierre; Pygeum parreauanum Pierre ex Cardot; Pygeum parreavii Pierre ex Cardot; Pygeum sessiliflorum Cardot; Pygeum tokangpengii Merr.; Pygeum topengii Merr.; Pygeum wilsonii Koehne; Pygeum wilsonii Koehne ex C.Y.Wu; Pygeum wilsonii var. macrophyllum L.D.Lu; Prunus arborea var. robusta (Koord. & Valeton) Kalkman: Pygeum arboreum var. robustum (Koord. & Valeton); Pygeum parviflorum var. robustum Koord. & Valeton; Pygeum parviflorum var. subcordatum Koord. & Valeton; Pygeum robustum (Koord. & Valeton) Koehne; Pygeum subcordatum (Koord. & Valeton) Koehne; Pygeum timorense Koehne; Prunus arborea var. stipulacea (King) Kalkman: Pygeum arboreum var. stipulaceum (King); Pygeum ellipticum Merr.; Pygeum pachyphyllum Merr.; Pygeum stipulaceum King

Species of flowering plant

Prunus arborea, most commonly known as xoan đào, is a species of flowering plant in the rose family, Rosaceae. It is distributed throughout Asia and parts of Melanesia.

== Description ==
Prunus arborea is a mid-canopy deciduous tree that typically grows between 7–40 m (23–131 ft) in height, with a straight, cylindrical bole that can reach up to 74 cm (29 in) in diameter, sometimes with buttresses. The dark gray bark is relatively smooth, while the twigs are black-brown to dark purple-brown, featuring conspicuous small lenticels and initially pubescent surfaces that quickly become glabrous. The wood is lightweight with a density of 0.56 g/cm^{3} (0.020 oz/cm^{3}) and exhibits a golden-brown coloration with a variable grain, medium to coarse texture, and a distinctive moiré pattern accented by whitish speckles. The leaves exhibit notable variability both in shape and venation, ranging from papery to nearly leathery, ovate-lanceolate to elliptic, with dimensions between 7–15 cm (2.8–5.9 in) long and 2–7 cm (0.79–2.76 in) wide. The apex is acuminate to caudate-acuminate, the base is acute to cuneate, and the entire margins are pubescent when young, later becoming glabrous. The undersides sometimes bear nectary glands near the petiole insertion, which itself measures 6–10 mm (0.24–0.39 in) long and is glabrous or sparsely pubescent, while stipules are caducous and around 5 mm (0.20 in) long.

Flowers appear in clustered or solitary racemes in leaf axils, measuring 1.5–3.5 cm (0.59–1.38 in) long, with brown soft hairs that may persist or fall off with age. The pedicels are 1–3 mm (0.039–0.118 in) long and pubescent at flowering. The small bracts drop early, and flowers are approximately 1–8 mm (0.039–0.315 in) in diameter, white, yellow, or pinkish in hue. The bell-shaped or obconical calyx, about 2 mm (0.079 in) long and 3 mm (0.12 in) wide, is externally covered in brown soft hairs. Typically, flowers possess 10 tepals, with triangular-ovate sepals that are 0.5–1 mm (0.020–0.039 in) long and acutely tipped, and 5 oblong petals that are slightly longer than the sepals and sometimes indistinct. Stamens number between 15 and 25 and measure 4–6 mm (0.16–0.24 in) in length, while the ovary is glabrous, and the style extends about 3 mm (0.12 in). The fruits are solitary drupes, globular to transversely short-oblong, measuring 7–10 mm (0.28–0.39 in) long and 9–12 mm (0.35–0.47 in) wide, dark purple-brown in color, and glabrous. When immature, fruits transition from green to red and eventually to black. Each fruit contains two brown seeds. Flowering occurs from August to October, with fruiting from November to December.

== Taxonomy ==
Prunus arborea was first described by Carl Ludwig Blume in 1826 as Polydontia arborea, later reassigned to its current name by Cornelis Kalkman in 1965. Due to Prunus having a long and complicated taxonomic history, the taxon has changed many times, resulting in a long list of synonyms, totaling approximately 70 across its varieties.

=== Varieties ===
Prunus arborea is a widespread and variable species, exhibiting significant morphological variation across its 6 varieties, which differ in leaf shape, stipule structure, ovary indumentum, and raceme length.

==== Prunus arborea var. alticola ====
Prunus arborea var. alticola, first described by Cornelis Kalkman in 1993, is a tree primarily found in the wet tropical biome. It differs from Prunus arborea var. stipulacea by having fewer secondary veins, a predominantly glabrous seed coat, and its preference for higher elevations. Distributed across Borneo, Peninsular Malaysia, Sulawesi, and Sumatra, it thrives in forests at altitudes ranging from 1,000–3,000 m (3,300–9,800 ft). Morphologically, its ovate to elliptic leaves measure 6–16 cm (2.4–6.3 in) in length and 2.5–12 cm (0.98–4.72 in) in width, with 8–10 pairs of secondary veins.

==== Prunus arborea var. arborea ====
Prunus arborea var. arborea, a variety of unknown taxonomic origin that is commonly known as kawojang and kitum-bilah as to differentiate it from its parent taxon, is a mid-canopy tree found in the wet tropical biome within primary and secondary forests throughout Indonesia, Malaysia, Papua New Guinea, the Philippines, and Singapore, where it is usually found at elevations of around 136 m (446 ft).

===== Economic value and furniture production =====
The wood of Prunus arborea, commonly known as xoan dao, is highly valued in the woodworking and furniture manufacturing industry, particularly in Vietnam. The heartwood exhibits a distinctive natural pinkish-red hue that deepens beautifully with age, complemented by an attractive wavy or moire grain pattern with fine whitish speckles. Classified as a lightweight timber, it offers a desirable balance of strength, hardness, and minimal warping once it has undergone proper technical treatment such as kiln-drying and seasoning. Its rapid growth rate enables a relatively short harvesting cycle of approximately 6 to 10 years, making it a highly productive and economically stable option for commercial forestry. It is extensively utilized in the production of high-quality household interior furnishings, including kitchen cabinets, beds, wardrobes, doors, and dining sets, as well as being a popular choice for premium decorative veneers and plywood faces.

==== Prunus arborea var. densa ====
Prunus arborea var. densa, first described by George King in 1897 as Pygeum parviflorum var. densum and later reassigned to its current name by Cornelis Kalkman in 1965, is a tree or shrub reaching up to 26 m (85 ft), primarily found in lowland and montane forests of Peninsular Malaysia, Sumatra, and Borneo at elevations between 150–2,000 m (490–6,560 ft). Its twigs are densely pubescent but become glabrous over time, while its ovate to elliptic-oblong leaves, measuring 3–15 cm (1.2–5.9 in), and remain hairy beneath when mature. The species typically has two basal glands, which are flat in most Malayan specimens but distinctly hollowed in some Bornean and Sumatran individuals. Flowers, arranged in racemes of 2–4, are yellowish or brownish, while fruits are transversely ellipsoid, 6–84 mm (0.24–3.31 in) by 8–11 mm (0.31–0.43 in), and transition from green, cream, or red to purplish-black upon maturity. Chemical analysis of its leaves, twigs, and stem bark identified volatile compounds such as benzaldehyde, benzoic acid, and phenylpropanoids, suggesting potential applications in flavoring, perfumery, and herbal products.

==== Prunus arborea var. montana ====
Prunus arborea var. montana, commonly known as 腎果木 in Chinese and ホザキカナメモチ in Japanese as to differentiate it from its parent taxon, and first described by Joseph Dalton Hooker in 1878 as Pygeum montanum and later reassigned to its current name in 1965 by Cornelis Kalkman, is a tree species native to Bhutan, Cambodia, China, India, Laos, Pakistan, Thailand, and Vietnam, thriving in evergreen forests at elevations of 0–2,000 m (0–6,562 ft). It grows 8–25 m (26–82 ft) tall, with grayish-brown, pubescent branchlets that become glabrescent and bear lenticels. Its elliptic to ovate leaves, 6–39 cm (2.4–15.4 in), have entire margins, acuminate apices, and persistent pubescence, often with two basal nectaries. Axillary racemes, 2–7 cm (0.79–2.76 in), bear numerous small, white flowers with sepals and petals often indistinguishable, 20–30 stamens, and a typically hairy ovary. The dark brown or black globular drupe, 6–15 mm (0.24–0.59 in), is glabrous, sometimes didymous. The bark is gray to brown, with reddish-purple inner layers and the wood is reddish. Flowering occurs in summer, with fruiting in winter.

==== Prunus arborea var. robusta ====
Prunus arborea var. robusta, first described in 1900 by Sijfert Hendrik Koorders and Theodoric Valeton as Pygeum parviflorum var. robustum and later reassigned to its current name in 1965 by Cornelis Kalkman, is a tall tree reaching up to 32 m (105 ft), and native to Java and the Lesser Sunda Islands, thriving in periodically dry tropical forests at elevation of 800–1,800 m (2,600–5,900 ft). Young twigs are pubescent but quickly glabrescent. Leaves are ovate to lanceolate, with 6–10 pairs of nerves and occasional inconspicuous glands. Racemes are often compound, with pedicels 2–6 mm (0.079–0.236 in). Flowers have 6–10 perianth segments, a densely hairy ovary, and larger transversely ellipsoid to didymous fruits, 9–17 mm (0.35–0.67 in) in diameter, with a hairy seed coat. The bark is smooth and brown, with a reddish-brown inner layer. Flowers are either white and fragrant or yellow and foetid, while fruits ripen from green to black.

==== Prunus arborea var. stipulacea ====
Prunus arborea var. stipulacea, commonly known as mentjelangai as to differentiate it from its parent taxon, was first described in 1897 by George King as Pygeum stipulaceum and later reassigned to its current name in 1965 by Cornelis Kalkman, is a tree, occasionally shrubby, reaching up to 20 m (66 ft), native to Indonesia, Malaysia, Singapore, and Vietnam. It inhabits primary and secondary forests, mossy regions, and subalpine scrub from lowland elevations of 0–3,200 m (0–10,499 ft). Twigs are densely pubescent, becoming glabrescent. Leaves are elliptic to oblong, pubescent when young, often retaining indumentum on the lower surface, with 8–16 pairs of nerves and variable basal glands. Stipules, 4–11 mm (0.16–0.43 in), may have flat or crateriform glands and are sometimes persistent. Racemes occur in bundles, rarely solitary, with pedicels 0–3 mm (0.00–0.12 in) long. Flowers have 6–10 perianth segments, a densely hairy ovary, and didymous or transversely ellipsoid fruits (6–14 mm) with a seed coat that ranges from densely hairy to glabrous. Bark is brown, smooth, lenticellate, exuding gum, with a reddish-brown blaze. Flowers are white to cream-colored with brown indumentum; fruits mature from green to white, red, and finally black. While altitudinal populations exhibit morphological overlap, some high-altitude specimens show more stamens and nerves.

=== Etymology ===
The genus name Prunus is derived from the Latin "prūnus," which is borrowed from Ancient Greek. The species epithet of Prunus aborea means "like a tree."

== Distribution and habitat ==
Prunus arborea is native to a broad geographic range spanning most of Asia, with its distribution extending from the eastern Himalayas to New Guinea. It is specifically documented in the Philippines, including Luzon in Aurora, Mindanao in Bukidnon and Misamis Oriental, and Mindoro, as well as in China, notably within Guangxi, Guangdong, and Hainan. The species is also found across Brunei, Cambodia, Laos, Malaysia, Myanmar, Pakistan, Papua New Guinea, Singapore, Thailand, Timor-Leste, and Vietnam. In Indonesia, the plant is endemic to the islands of Borneo, Java, the Lesser Sunda Islands, Maluku, Sulawesi, and Sumatra. The species is supposedly native to Nepal and Bhutan, but there are currently no confirmed records to substantiate this claim. Prunus arborea has also been introduced to parts of the United States, highlighting its adaptability to diverse tropical and subtropical environments.

== Ecology ==
Prunus arborea is native to the wet tropical biome, thriving in mixed dipterocarp, keranga, sub-montane, and montane evergreen forests. It is typically found on hillsides and ridges, as well as along streams and rivers, where it grows on sandy soils at elevations ranging from 200–3,700 m (660–12,140 ft). It is also found in lower-altitude foothills and dense humid forests, where it is commonly observed between 200–500 m (660–1,640 ft). The species relies on entomophily and serves as a food source for Hylobates muelleri. Its presence in diverse forest ecosystems underscores its ecological adaptability and role within tropical and temperate habitats.

== Conservation status ==
Prunus arborea is widespread with an estimated EOO exceeding 12,000,000 km^{2} (7,500,000 mi^{2}). Although population data is unavailable, the species is assumed to be stable and does not face major threats across its range. Localized threats may exist, but they do not significantly impact the species overall. The taxon is known from both ex situ collections and in situ conservation areas. Given its broad distribution and lack of substantial threats, the species is classified as LC by the IUCN Red List.

== Uses ==
Prunus arborea exhibits both medicinal potential and serious toxicity. The plant, particularly its seeds and young shoots, contains cyanogenic glycosides like amygdalin and prunasin, which release cyanide upon ingestion, making it highly dangerous—posing a fatal risk to humans and animals. Despite its hazards, extracts from the plant have shown medicinal applications such as a phytosterol extract obtained from the plant containing glycine, alanine, and glutamic acid, was evaluated in a clinical study and demonstrated efficacy in treating prostatitis in 94 out of 100 patients without reported side effects. A decoction of leaves has been traditionally used to precipitate childbirth, though pharmacological data on this use remains scarce. Additionally, studies on its leaf essential oil have identified dominant constituents such as benzoic acid, α-methoxy toluene/benzyl alcohol, and (E,E)-α-farnesene/benzaldehyde. While small amounts of cyanogenic glycosides have been utilized in medicine for their stimulatory effects on respiration and digestion, larger doses can lead to severe poisoning symptoms, including convulsions, coma, and respiratory failure. The level of bitterness in fruits and seeds of the species generally correlates with toxin concentration, necessitating caution when consuming any plant material.

The wood of Prunus arborea, known for its natural pink-red hue that deepens with age, is highly valued for its aesthetic and practical properties in furniture and construction. The woods grain, arranged in rippling layers, enhances its visual appeal, while its durability ensures resistance to warping when properly treated. Though initially vulnerable to termites, post-treatment significantly boosts its resistance. The wood is versatile—easy to process, carve, and finish—making it a popular choice for tables, chairs, wardrobes, flooring, kitchen cabinets, and decorative shelves. It compares favorably with other wood types: it is sturdier and more affordable than rosewood and easier to work with than oak or ash wood. The bark has traditional applications, such as crafting rice containers, while the timber is widely used for veneer, plywood, general furniture, and medium-scale construction. With its affordability, termite resistance, and aesthetic appeal, the wood remains one of the most sought-after choices in the woodworking industry.

Seeds require 2–3 months of cold stratification and should be sown in a cold frame immediately after ripening. Stored seeds are best sown in a nursery seedbed early in the year and must be protected from pests like mice. Germination can be slow, sometimes taking up to 18 months. Once seedlings are large enough to handle, they should be transplanted into individual pots and grown until ready for planting. Propagation can also be done through cuttings—half-ripe wood cuttings with a heel can be placed in a frame, while softwood cuttings from vigorously growing plants can also be used. Layering is another viable method for propagation.

== Regional common names ==
The common names of Prunus arborea vary by geographical location, and with its large range, there are many terms. In Indonesian, the plant goes by akil, enkalamos, jentili, kalana, medang, moyang, rotang bari, and vongking-vongking. In Chinese, it goes by 大臀果木, and in Vietnamese, it goes by cáng lò, loan dao, sapele, sapeli, soan dao, xoan lao, and xoan đào, which is the most notable common name. Other names include currant laurel in English, kabung in the Philippines, merubik in Malaysia, taeng chang in Thailand, and its trade name, which is tenangau.
