= Prunus stellipila =

Scientific classification
- Kingdom: Plantae
- Clade: Tracheophytes
- Clade: Angiosperms
- Clade: Eudicots
- Clade: Rosids
- Order: Rosales
- Family: Rosaceae
- Genus: Prunus
- Subgenus: Prunus subg. Padus
- Species: P. stellipila

Binomial name
- Prunus stellipila Koehne

Synonyms
- Padus stellipila (Koehne) T.T.Yu & T.C.Ku

Species of tree

Prunus stellipila (Chinese: 星毛稠李) is a species of Prunus native to central China, preferring to grow at 1000–1800 m. It is a tree typically 6–9 m tall, but reaching 20 m.

== Uses ==
People in rural Shaanxi province use its wood to make items of furniture, and particularly favor it for making chopping boards. They refer to it as 苦桃, "bitter peach".
