= Prunus grisea =

Conservation status
- Least Concern (IUCN 3.1)

Scientific classification
- Kingdom: Plantae
- Clade: Tracheophytes
- Clade: Angiosperms
- Clade: Eudicots
- Clade: Rosids
- Order: Rosales
- Family: Rosaceae
- Genus: Prunus
- Subgenus: Prunus subg. Padus
- Species: P. grisea

Binomial name
- Prunus grisea (Blume ex Müll.Berol.) Kalkman

Varieties
- List: Prunus grisea var. grisea; Prunus grisea var. microphylla Kalkman; Prunus grisea var. tomentosa (Koord. & Valeton) Kalkman

Synonyms
- List Prunus grisea (Blume ex Müll.Berol.) Kalkman (Note: The synonyms of Prunus grisea are disputed between databases, but certain redundancies and errors have been excluded for simplicity. In addition, Pygeum albivenium and Pygeum brevistilum are unplaced names whose synonymy with Prunus grisea or its varieties is suspected but unresolved.): Prunus macrocarpum (T.T.Yu & L.T.Lu); Pygeum brevistilum K.Schum.; Pygeum confusum Blume ex Müll.Berol.; Pygeum griseum Blume ex Müll.Berol.; Pygeum latifolium (C.Presl) Rehder; Pygeum latifolium subsp. genuinum Koord. & Valeton; Pygeum latifolium subsp. nervosum Koord. & Valeton; Pygeum latifolium var. macrocarpum (T.T.Yu & L.T.Lu) C.Y.Wu & H.Chu; Pygeum macrocarpum T.T.Yu & L.T.Lu; Pygeum oblongum T.T.Yu & L.T.Lu; Pygeum polyneurum Hook.f.; Pygeum preslii subsp. latifolium (C.Presl) Koehne; Pygeum preslii subsp. vulgare Koehne; Prunus grisea var. grisea: Germaria latifolia C.Presl; Prunus odorata (M.R.Hend.) Whitmore; Pygeum celebicum Miq.; Pygeum confusum Blume; Pygeum decipiens Koehne; Pygeum gitingense Elmer; Pygeum griseum Blume; Pygeum lanceolatum Hook.f.; Pygeum lanceolatum var. valetonianum Koehne; Pygeum latifolium Miq.; Pygeum latifolium f. genuinum Koord. & Valeton; Pygeum latifolium var. nervosum Koord. & Valeton; Pygeum latiphyllum Elmer; Pygeum melanocarpum Merr. & L.M.Perry; Pygeum neglectum Koehne; Pygeum odoratum M.R.Hend.; Pygeum preslii Merr.; Pygeum preslii var. latifolium (C.Presl) Koehne; Pygeum preslii var. vulgare Koehne; Pygeum vulgare (Koehne) Merr.; Prunus grisea var. microphylla Kalkman: Pygeum albivenium Koehne; Pygeum griseum var. microphylla (Kalkman); Prunus grisea var. tomentosa (Koord. & Valeton) Kalkman: Prunus maingayi (Hook.f.) Anonymous; Prunus persimile (Kurz); Pygeum apiculatum J.E.Vidal; Pygeum arboreum Backer & Bakh.f.; Pygeum griseum var. tomentosa (Koord. & Valeton); Pygeum havilandii Ridl.; Pygeum hookerianum King; Pygeum hookerianum var. borneense Ridl.; Pygeum kingianum Craib; Pygeum koordersianum Koehne; Pygeum lanceolatum var. maingayi (Hook.f.) Ridl.; Pygeum latifolium f. lanceolatum Koord. & Valeton; Pygeum latifolium var. tomentosum Koord. & Valeton; Pygeum longistylum J.E.Vidal; Pygeum maingayi Hook.f.; Pygeum membranaceum Koehne; Pygeum microphyllum Elmer; Pygeum parviflorum A.Meeuse & Adelb.; Pygeum persimile Kurz; Pygeum velutinosum Ridl.

Species of flowering plant

Prunus grisea, most commonly known as lago, is a species of flowering plant in the family Rosaceae, and is endemically distributed throughout East, South, and Southeast Asia, as well as parts of Melanesia, spanning over many countries.

== Description ==
Prunus grisea is a versatile tree or shrub, reaching heights of up to 35 m (115 ft), with a crooked or straight cylindrical bole that can remain branchless for up to 15 m (49 ft) and reach diameters of 1 m (3 ft 3 in), occasionally displaying small buttresses. The twigs are initially pubescent to puberulous, quickly becoming glabrous. The leaves vary in shape, predominantly elliptic to oblong but sometimes ovate or lanceolate, ranging from 2–20 cm (0.79–7.87 in) in length and 1–9 cm (0.39–3.54 in) in width, with a rounded or acute base and typically an acuminate apex, though it can occasionally be obtuse. They exhibit 5–9 pairs of venation, which is inconspicuous to invisible, and are sparsely pubescent to glabrous on both surfaces. Basal glands, typically two but occasionally absent or numbering up to 4, are flat, with additional glands often present. The petiole measures between 0.2–2 cm (0.079–0.787 in) and transitions from pubescent to glabrous. Stipules, linear and deciduous, range from 1.5–8 mm (0.059–0.315 in) in length, typically glabrous inside but occasionally glandular-serrate on the margins. The solitary axillary racemes measure between 0.5–6.5 cm (0.20–2.56 in), with a peduncle up to 1 cm (0.39 in) and a sparsely pubescent rachis. Pedicels are very short, between 0–7 mm (0.00–0.28 in). The hypanthium, 1.5–4 mm (0.059–0.157 in) high, is pubescent externally, glabrous inside or occasionally with hairs on the bottom. The perianth consists of 6–13 segments that are either subequal or distinguishable as sepals and petals, measuring between 0.5–2 mm (0.020–0.079 in). Flowers lack true petals, with stamens numbering 15–50, possessing filaments up to 6 mm (0.24 in) long and anthers between 0.2–0.8 mm (0.0079–0.0315 in) in length. The ovary is generally glabrous but may exhibit some hairs, rarely being distinctly hairy, with a style up to 7 mm (0.28 in) long. The fruits are globular to transversely ellipsoid, measuring 6–13 mm (0.24–0.51 in) by 7–16 mm (0.28–0.63 in), occasionally pointed or beaked, with a nearly glabrous exocarp that transitions in color from whitish to red, then purple, and ultimately black. The mesocarp is thin, and the endocarp is either glabrous or sparsely hairy internally, and the seed has a smooth, glabrous testa. The wood of Prunus grisea is diffuse-porous, with a density of 0.57 g/cm^{3}, displaying vessels numbering 5–20/mm^{2} and tangential vessel lumina ranging from 100–200 μm (0.0039–0.0079 in). Vessel-ray pits are coarse throughout the ray cells, and perforation plates are simple. Intervessel pits are small, measuring 7 μm (0.00028 in) or less, with occasional helical thickenings. Axial parenchyma appears in diffuse or aggregated apotracheal formations and in scanty or vasicentric paratracheal arrangements, sometimes forming aliform structures with strands of 5–8 cells. Rays exceed 1 mm (0.039 in) in height and are 1–3 cells wide, composed of procumbent body ray cells with 2–4 rows of upright or square marginal cells. Fibers are very thin-walled, with simple to minutely bordered pits. The heartwood is reddish brown, while the sapwood is lighter in color. The grain is typically wavy or interlocked, and the texture is fine to medium.

== Distribution ==
Prunus grisea is found across a very wide range, encompassing many regions. In Malesia, it is present throughout its near entirety, where it occurs most notably in Bohol, Borneo, Cebu, Java, the Kangean and Lesser Sunda Islands, Leyte, Luzon, the Maluku Islands, Mindanao, Mindoro, New Guinea, Palawan, Sibuyan, Sulawesi, and Sumatra. The presence of Prunus grisea within Indochina extends to Cambodia, Myanmar, Peninsular Malaysia, Singapore, Thailand, and Vietnam. Other countries in Asia include Afghanistan, China, where it occurs in Guangdong and Yunnan, along with India, Japan, and Taiwan. Outside of Asia, the plant has been introduced to Guinea, the Hawaiian Islands, Queensland, and the United Kingdom.

Prunus grisea was inferred to have dispersed from the Sunda Shelf to the Philippines in the early Miocene, having dispersed from Sahul to the Sunda shelf during the late Oligocene and early Miocene, suggesting historical movement across these biogeographic zones. Collections of Prunus grisea from various localities did not form a distinct clade, indicating unresolved phylogenetic relationships within the section Mesopygeum.

== Ecology ==
Prunus grisea is primarily found in the wet tropical biome, thriving across a broad elevational range from 0–3,700 m (0–12,139 ft). In its native habitat, it occupies primary and secondary lowland to montane forests, with distinct elevational preferences among its varieties, being a plant that engages in zoochory. In Hawaii, the plant has been naturalized, having been observed forming dense seedling carpets and thickets of scattered saplings around planted trees, the seedlings exceeding 100/m^{2}, predominantly within a concentrated 400 m^{2} (1,300 ft^{2}) area surrounding the original plantings.

== Taxonomy ==
Prunus grisea was first described by Carl Ludwig Blume in 1858 as Pygeum griseum, and was later reassigned to its current name by Cornelis Kalkman in 1965. Due to Prunus having a long and complicated taxonomic history, the taxon has changed many times, resulting in a long list of synonyms, totaling approximately 55 across its varieties.

== Onomastics ==
The common names of Prunus grisea vary by region, displaying a variety of terms due to its large extent. In the Philippines, the plant goes by amongyang, amatogan, and lago, which is also its trade name. In China, it goes by 蘭嶼野櫻花, and in Thailand, it goes by nut ton (Thai: นูดต้น).

The genus name Prunus is derived from the Latin "prūnus," which is borrowed from Ancient Greek. The species epithet of Prunus grisea is the nominative form of its neuter counterpart, meaning "gray."

== Varieties ==
Prunus arborea is a widespread and variable species, exhibiting morphological variation across its 3 varieties.

=== Prunus grisea var. grisea ===
Prunus grisea var. grisea, a variety of unknown taxonomic origin, is a tropical tree reaching up to 40 m (130 ft) found across Asia, inhabiting the primary and secondary forests of the wet tropical biome, at elevations of 0–3,400 m (0–11,155 ft). The bark is smooth or lenticellate, varying from gray-brown to dark brown, with an inner bark that is yellowish and has a strong odor. The leaves are elliptic to oblong or ovate to lanceolate, ranging from 5–20 cm (2.0–7.9 in) by 2.5–9 cm (0.98–3.54 in). Inflorescences appear as racemes 1.5–6.5 cm (0.59–2.56 in) long, with pedicels numbering 1–7 mm (0.039–0.276 in). The hypanthium is 2–4 mm (0.079–0.157 in) high, and perianth segments are subequal, sometimes divided into sepals and petals. Fruits are globular to transversely ellipsoid, and are 6–13 mm (0.24–0.51 in) by 8–16 mm (0.31–0.63 in), changing colors as they age. Morphological variations across its range are gradual, but geographical and altitudinal factors primarily account for distinguishing features rather than strict taxonomic divisions. Terms that distinguish the variety from its parent taxon include huru, kawojang, lego, tanga, tanga-tanga, and tunga. While sometimes reported as a timber tree, it is rarely exploited commercially.

=== Prunus grisea var. microphylla ===
Prunus grisea var. microphylla, first described by Cornelis Kalkman in 1965, is a shrub or small tree, rarely exceeding 20 m (66 ft), where it grows in montane and subalpine forests in the wet tropical biome of New Guinea, at elevations of 1,400–3,660 m (4,590–12,010 ft). It has rough, brown to gray bark, noted for use in crafting belts. The stiff-coriaceous leaves that are elliptic to elliptic-oblong, measuring 1.5–8.5 cm (0.59–3.35 in) by 1–5 cm (0.39–1.97 in), with an obtuse or retuse apex and 2–4 basal glands. Inflorescences are racemes 2–5 cm (0.79–1.97 in) long, with pedicels 1–4 mm (0.039–0.157 in). The hypanthium measures 1.5–3.5 mm (0.059–0.138 in) high, and perianth segments are subequal, occasionally divided into sepals and petals, which are 0.5–1.5 mm (0.020–0.059 in) long. The ovary is glabrous, and the fruits are transversely ellipsoid to subglobular, 6–9 mm (0.24–0.35 in) by 7–10.5 mm (0.28–0.41 in), with a hypanthium remnant under the fruit sometimes reaching 5 mm (0.20 in). Though it shares habitat and elevation ranges with other varieties, it is distinguished primarily by its smaller, thicker leaves, with transitional specimens being rare.

=== Prunus grisea var. tomentosa ===
Prunus grisea var. tomentosa, first described by Sijfert Hendrik Koorders and Theodoric Valeton in 1900 as Pygeum latifolium var. tomentosum and later reassigned to its current name by Cornelis Kalkman in 1965, is a small tree or shrub, typically under 15 m (49 ft) in height, with brown bark and ovate to oblong, papery leaves that measure 4–14 cm (1.6–5.5 in) by 1–6 cm (0.39–2.36 in) and often bear 2 basal glands. Its racemes are short, 1–2.5 cm (0.39–0.98 in), densely arranged, and bear 7–10 minute perianth segments, which are sometimes differentiated. The ovary is generally glabrous, though occasionally sparsely hairy, and produces fruits that range from transversely ellipsoid to subglobular, measuring 7–12 mm (0.28–0.47 in) by 8–12.5 mm (0.31–0.49 in), sometimes with a small apical beak. Its range spans throughout Southeast Asia, inhabiting the primary and secondary forests of the wet tropical biome at elevations of 0–1,650 m (0–5,413 ft), exhibiting some regional variation across its range. The species faces threats from habitat loss due to logging and shifting cultivation, leading to its listing of VU by the IUCN Red List, although further research is needed for updated conservation assessments.

== Uses ==
Studies on Prunus grisea indicate that its bark and leaves possess antioxidant and cytotoxic properties, with traditional uses including bark applications for skin irritation and leaves for rheumatism relief. Research evaluating its leaf decoction and various extracts has shown potent antioxidant activity, particularly in the decoction, which exhibited a 92.85% antiradical activity at 500 ppm, along with high total antioxidant capacity and phenolic content. Toxicity assessments using the brine shrimp lethality assay revealed that the chloroform extract had the highest toxicity, with an LC50 value of <10 ppm, while bioassay-guided fractionation of air-dried leaf hexane extracts identified PGH13 as the most bioactive fraction, demonstrating 56.67% mortality against Artemia salina.

The wood of Prunus grisea is legally unrestricted for use. It exhibits moderate durability but is generally perishable, making it susceptible to decay and insect damage. Drying is slow and can be challenging, with risks of distortion during the process. In veneer applications, Prunus grisea performs well, demonstrating good lamination properties in both rotary and sliced veneer cutting. Machining characteristics range from easy to fair. This wood is wild-crafted and is primarily used for indoor construction, cabinetry, general housing applications, furniture, plywood, and packing cases.

== Conservation status ==
Prunus grisea has an estimated EOO of 3,181,649.63 km^{2} (1,976,985.42 mi^{2}), far exceeding the thresholds for a threatened category, and it is not considered to be under major global threat. However, no information is currently available regarding its population size or trends. Notably, the species has previously been classified as threatened in localized assessments within the Philippines and Taiwan. Given its broad distribution and lack of major threats, it is assessed as LC by the IUCN Red List.
