= Prunus costata =

Conservation status
- Least Concern (IUCN 3.1)

Scientific classification
- Kingdom: Plantae
- Clade: Tracheophytes
- Clade: Angiosperms
- Clade: Eudicots
- Clade: Rosids
- Order: Rosales
- Family: Rosaceae
- Genus: Prunus
- Species: P. costata

Binomial name
- Prunus costata (Hemsl.) Kalkman

Synonyms
- Pygeum costatum Hemsl.; Pygeum papuanum Hemsl.; Pygeum rigidum Koehne; Pygeum retusum Merr. & Perry; Pygeum hagenianum Gilli

Species of tree

Prunus costata is a species of flowering plant in the family Rosaceae. It is native to New Guinea. It is a tree reaching 25 m, and is morphologically very similar to Prunus grisea var grisea, aside from their seeds. It flowers are borne on a raceme and have white petals only 1-3 mm long, with 20 to 35 stamens each. The numerous stamens are typically 5.5 mm long, giving the flowers a bristly appearance. P. costata flowers 3 to 4 times per year, and successfully sets fruit after most flowerings. The type specimen was collected on Mt. Scratchley at 10,000 to 13,000 ft (3,000–4,000 m).
