= West Indian cherry =

West Indian cherry is a common name for several plants and may refer to:

- Malpighia emarginata
- Prunus myrtifolia
