= Prunus crassifolia =

Scientific classification
- Kingdom: Plantae
- Clade: Tracheophytes
- Clade: Angiosperms
- Clade: Eudicots
- Clade: Rosids
- Order: Rosales
- Family: Rosaceae
- Genus: Prunus
- Species: P. crassifolia

Binomial name
- Prunus crassifolia (Hauman) Kalkman

Synonyms
- Lauro-cerasus crassifolia (Hauman) Browicz; Pygeum crassifolium Hauman

Species of plant

Prunus crassifolia is species of Prunus native to the Democratic Republic of the Congo. Some authorities consider it a synonym of Prunus africana.
