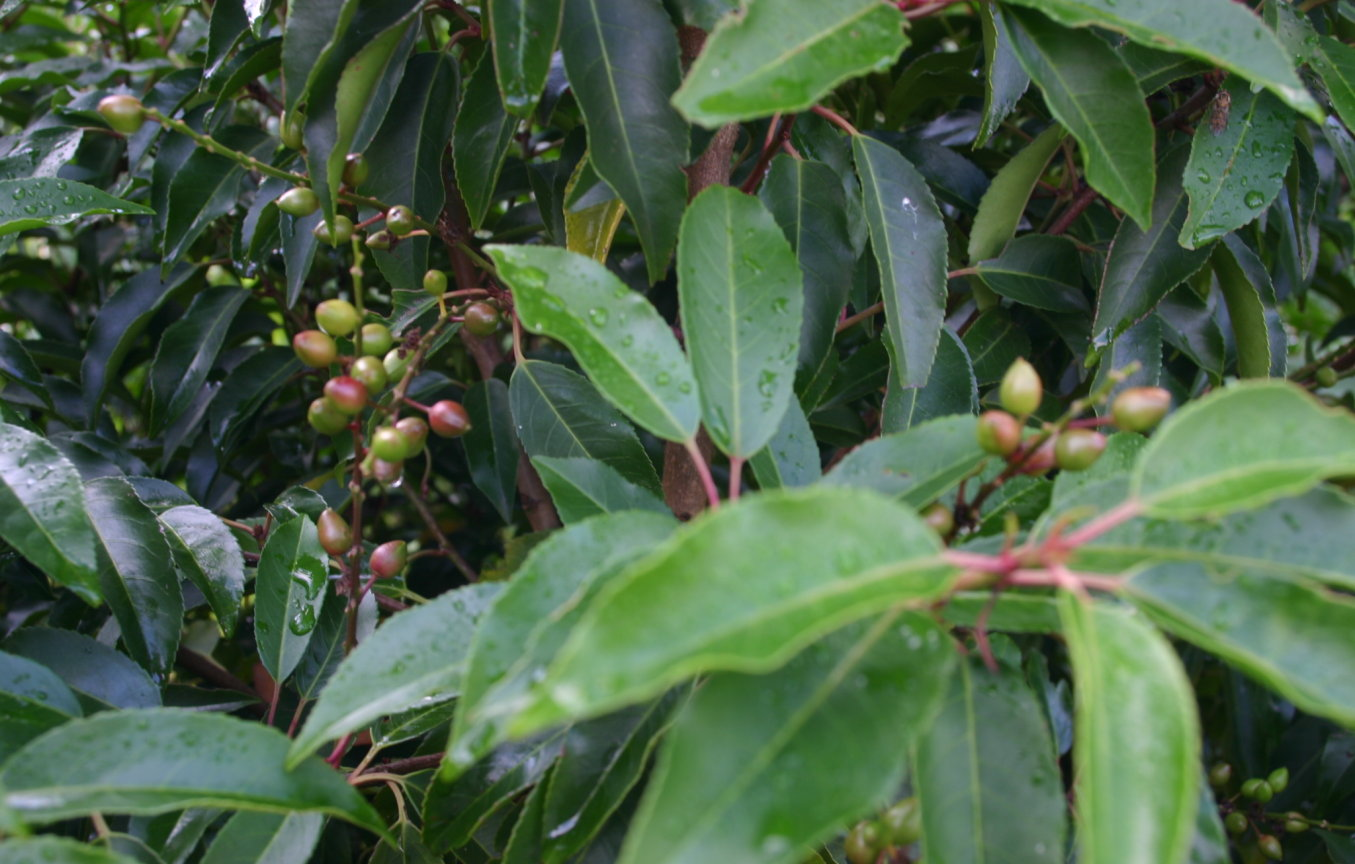
- Foliage and immature fruit

Conservation status
- Least Concern (IUCN 3.1)

Scientific classification
- Kingdom: Plantae
- Clade: Embryophytes
- Clade: Tracheophytes
- Clade: Angiosperms
- Clade: Eudicots
- Clade: Rosids
- Order: Rosales
- Family: Rosaceae
- Genus: Prunus
- Subgenus: Prunus subg. Padus
- Species: P. lusitanica

Binomial name
- Prunus lusitanica L.
- Distribution map

Synonyms
- Cerasus lusitanica (L.) Dum.Cours.; Laurocerasus lusitanica (L.) M.Roem.; Padus lusitanica (L.) Mill.

= Prunus lusitanica =

Prunus lusitanica Temporal range: 11.46–0 Ma Miocene - Present

Species of flowering plant

Prunus lusitanica, the Portuguese laurel cherry or Portugal laurel, is a species of flowering plant in the rose family Rosaceae, native to the Iberian Peninsula, Morocco, the Macaronesian archipelagos, and the French Basque Country.

The split between the subspecies (subsp. azorica, hixa, and lusitanica) is dated around the Pliocene.

== Description ==
Prunus lusitanica is an evergreen shrub or small tree growing to 3-8m tall (though it can reach 15-20m in cultivation). The bark is smooth and dark-grey. The leaves are alternate, oval, 7–15 cm long and 3–5 cm broad, with an acute apex and a dentate margin, glossy dark green above, lighter below. They superficially resemble those of the bay laurel, which accounts for its often being mistaken for one.

The flowers are small (10–15 mm diameter) with five small white petals; they are produced on erect or spreading racemes 15–25 cm long in late spring. The fruit is a small cherry-like drupe 8–13 mm in diameter, green or reddish green at first, turning dark purple or black when ripe in late summer or early autumn. It is edible but should not be eaten if too bitter.

== Distribution and habitat ==
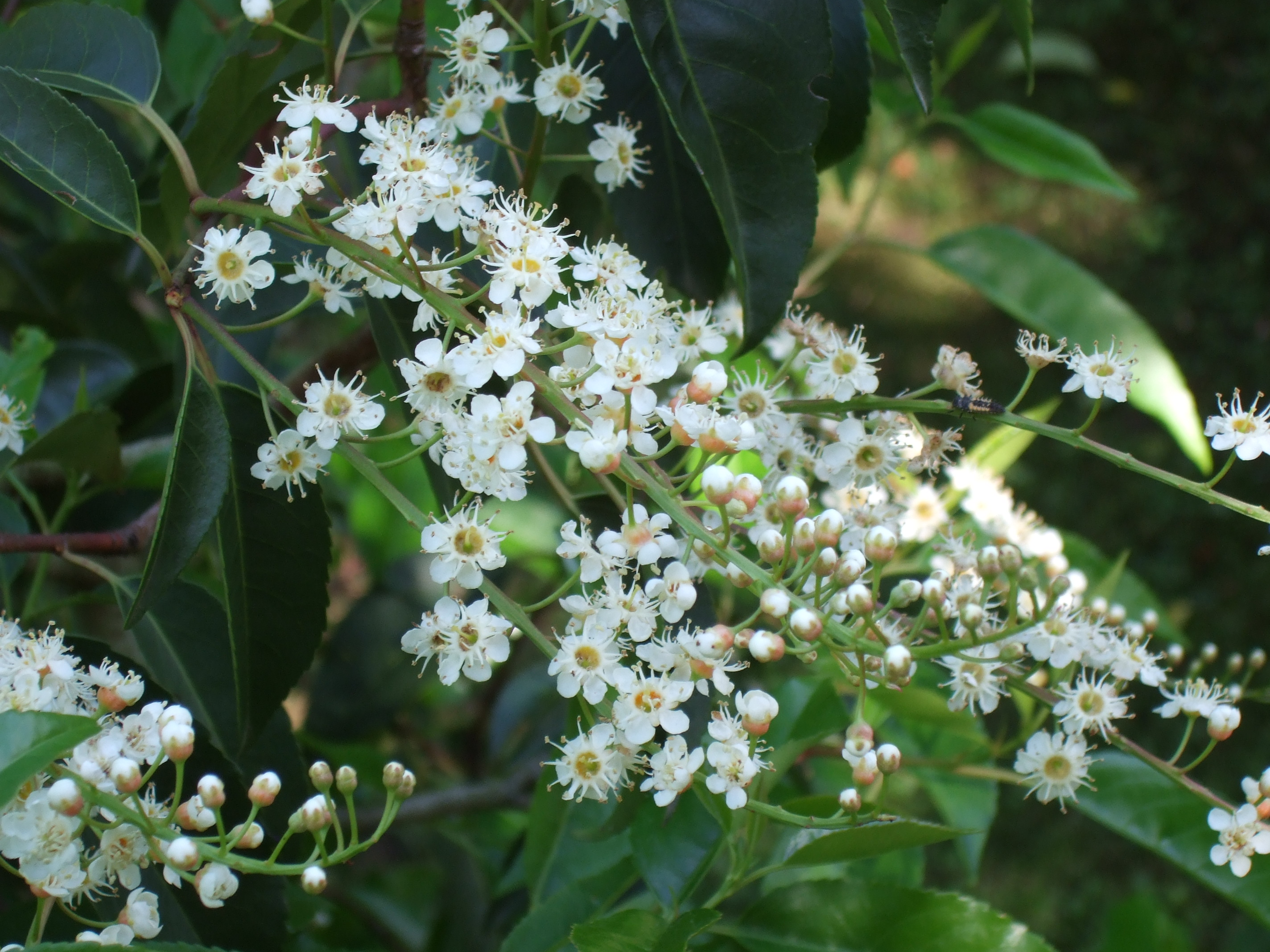
Flowers

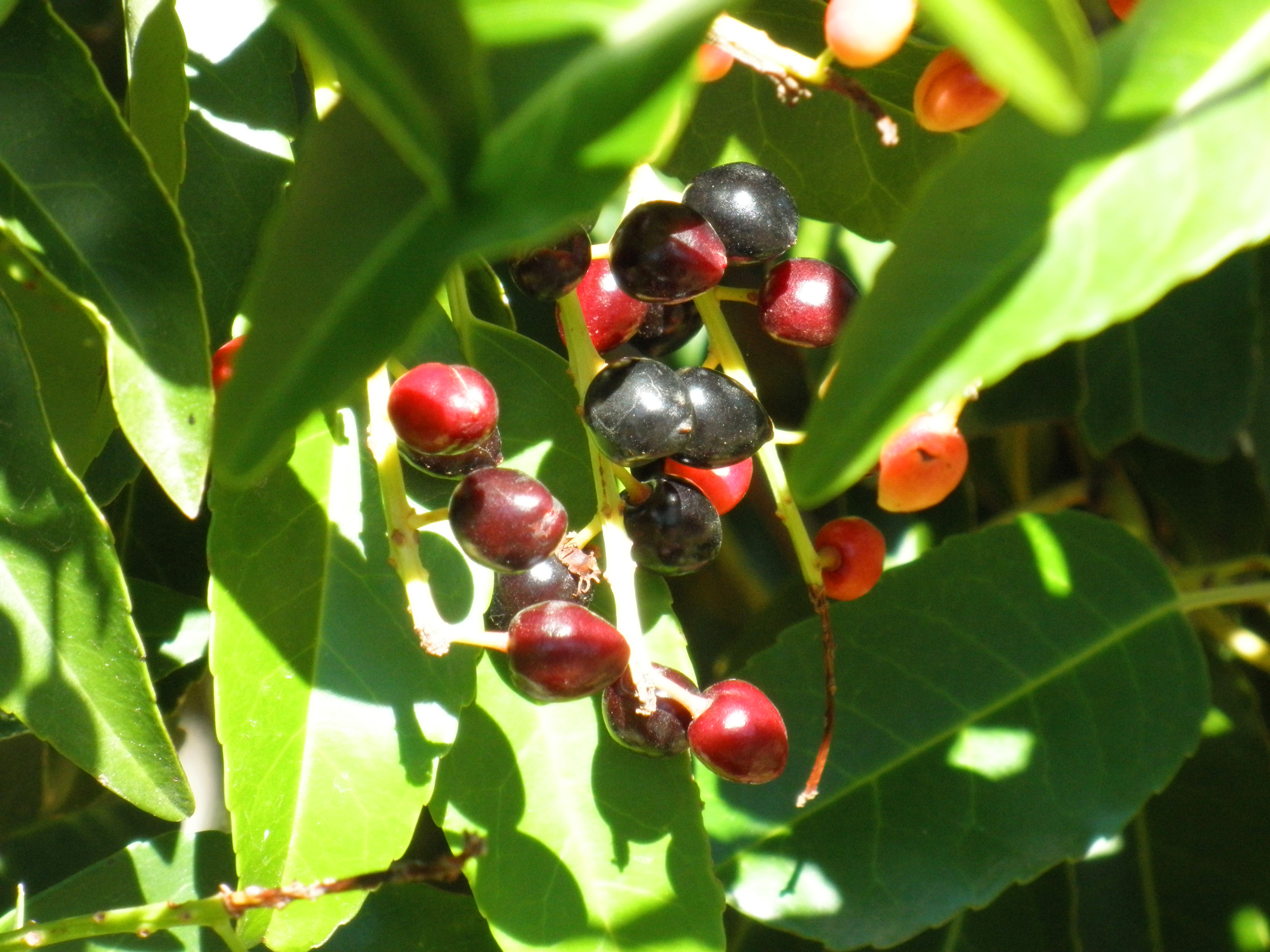
Ripe fruit

It occurs in the western Mediterranean Basin, France, Spain, and Portugal, and Macaronesia, Azores, Canary Islands and Madeira.

Prunus lusitanica is rare in the wild, found mainly along mountain streams, preferring sunshine and moist but well-drained soils. It is moderately drought-tolerant. It reproduces either sexually (the most successful method) or asexually by cloning from shoots.

== Name ==
The species was first scientifically described by Linnaeus in Species Plantarum in 1753. Its specific epithet lusitanica means "of Lusitania", referring to the Roman name for Portugal.

== Subspecies ==
Three subspecies are accepted:

- Prunus lusitanica subsp. lusitanica. Iberian Peninsula, South-West France, and north Morocco.
- Prunus lusitanica subsp. azorica (Mouill.) Franco. Azores.
- Prunus lusitanica subsp. hixa (Willd.) Franco. Canary Islands and Madeira.

== Cultivation ==
Prunus lusitanica is grown as an ornamental shrub and is widely planted as a hedge and for screening in gardens and parks. It is introduced and locally naturalised in the temperate zone in northern France, Great Britain, Ireland, New Zealand, Western Canada- including the southern BC Mainland and Vancouver Island From Victoria Up Island through the Cowichan, Nanaimo and Parksville as well as the western United States in California, Oregon and Washington State.

Similar to its relative Prunus laurocerasus, P. lusitanica has been recognized by some botanists and land managers in both western Washington and Oregon as invasive. It is thought to have spread from cultivated areas into natural areas by birds who consume the fruit and then defecate the seeds away from the source plant.

It has gained the Royal Horticultural Society's Award of Garden Merit.

== Toxicity ==
The leaves of Prunus lusitanica contain hydrogen cyanide and will release this into the environment if burnt or if crushed. The fruit is somewhat edible if fully ripe, but if it is bitter then it has too much hydrogen cyanide and should not be eaten.
