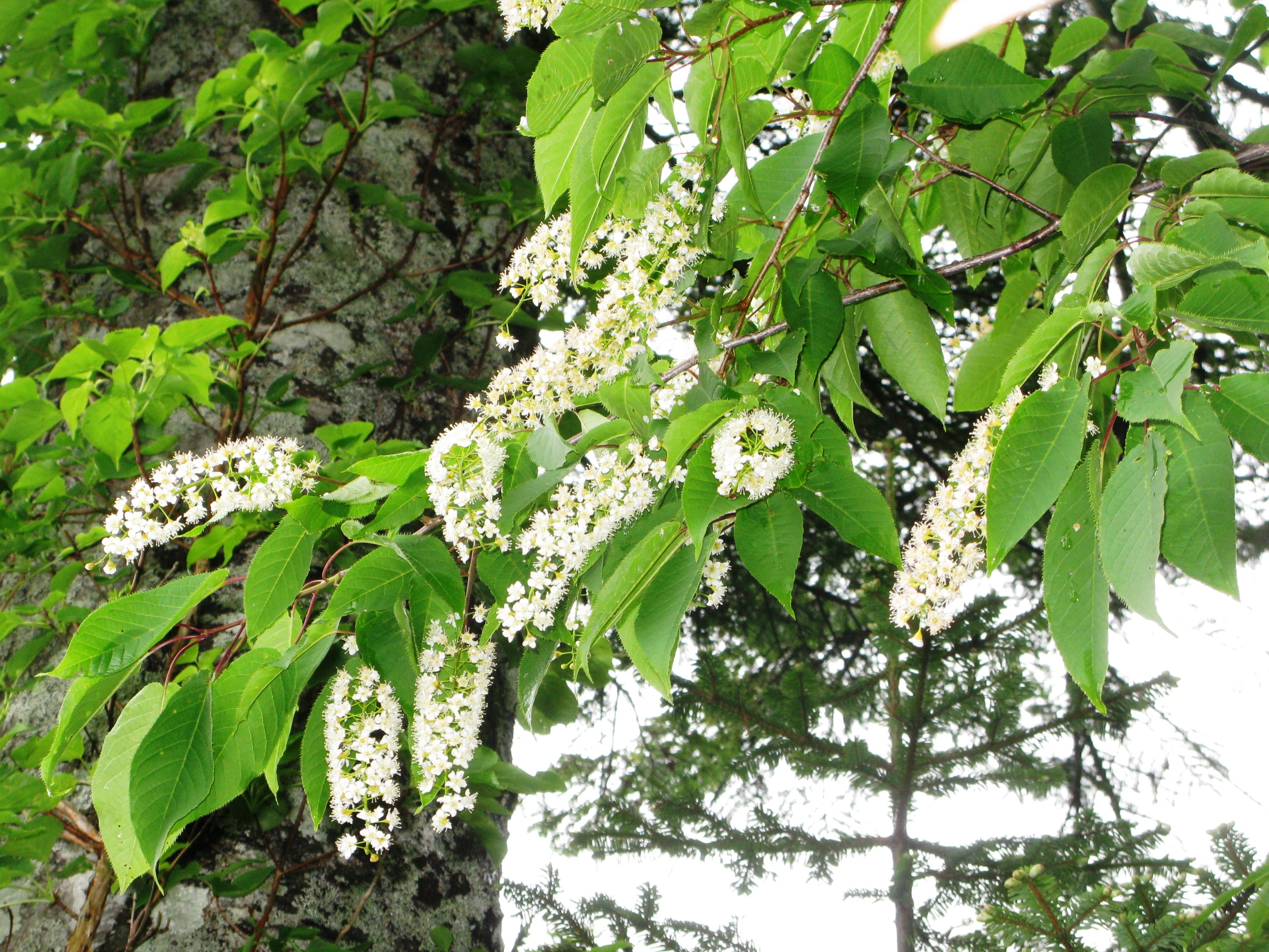
- Flowers and foliage

Conservation status
- Least Concern (IUCN 3.1)

Scientific classification
- Kingdom: Plantae
- Clade: Tracheophytes
- Clade: Angiosperms
- Clade: Eudicots
- Clade: Rosids
- Order: Rosales
- Family: Rosaceae
- Genus: Prunus
- Subgenus: Prunus subg. Padus
- Species: P. ssiori

Binomial name
- Prunus ssiori F.Schmidt, 1868

Synonyms
- Padus ssiori (F.Schmidt) C.K.Schneid.

= Prunus ssiori =

Species of tree

Prunus ssiori, the Hokkaido bird cherry or Japanese bird cherry, is a species of bird cherry native to northern Japan, Sakhalin Island, and the Kuril Islands. Some natural populations may occur on the far eastern mainland of Asia in Russia. Its specific epithet derives from its Ainu name, meaning "bitter".

== Uses ==
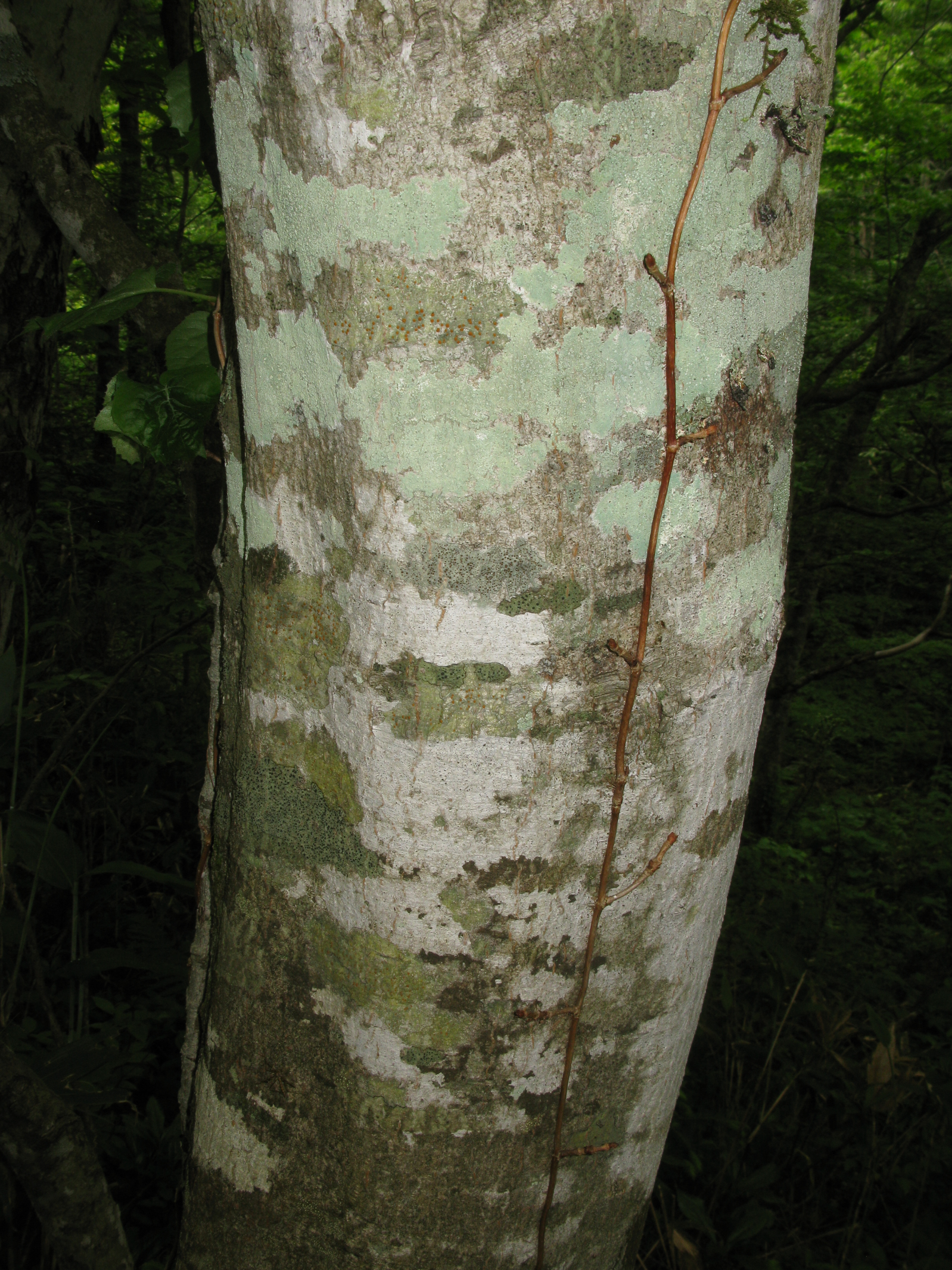
The bark is pale and lacy

Some cultivation of this species for its fruit is conducted by people in Japan and on Sakhalin. The Ainu and others use its wood for various crafts, such as hunting weapons, musical instruments, and furniture.
