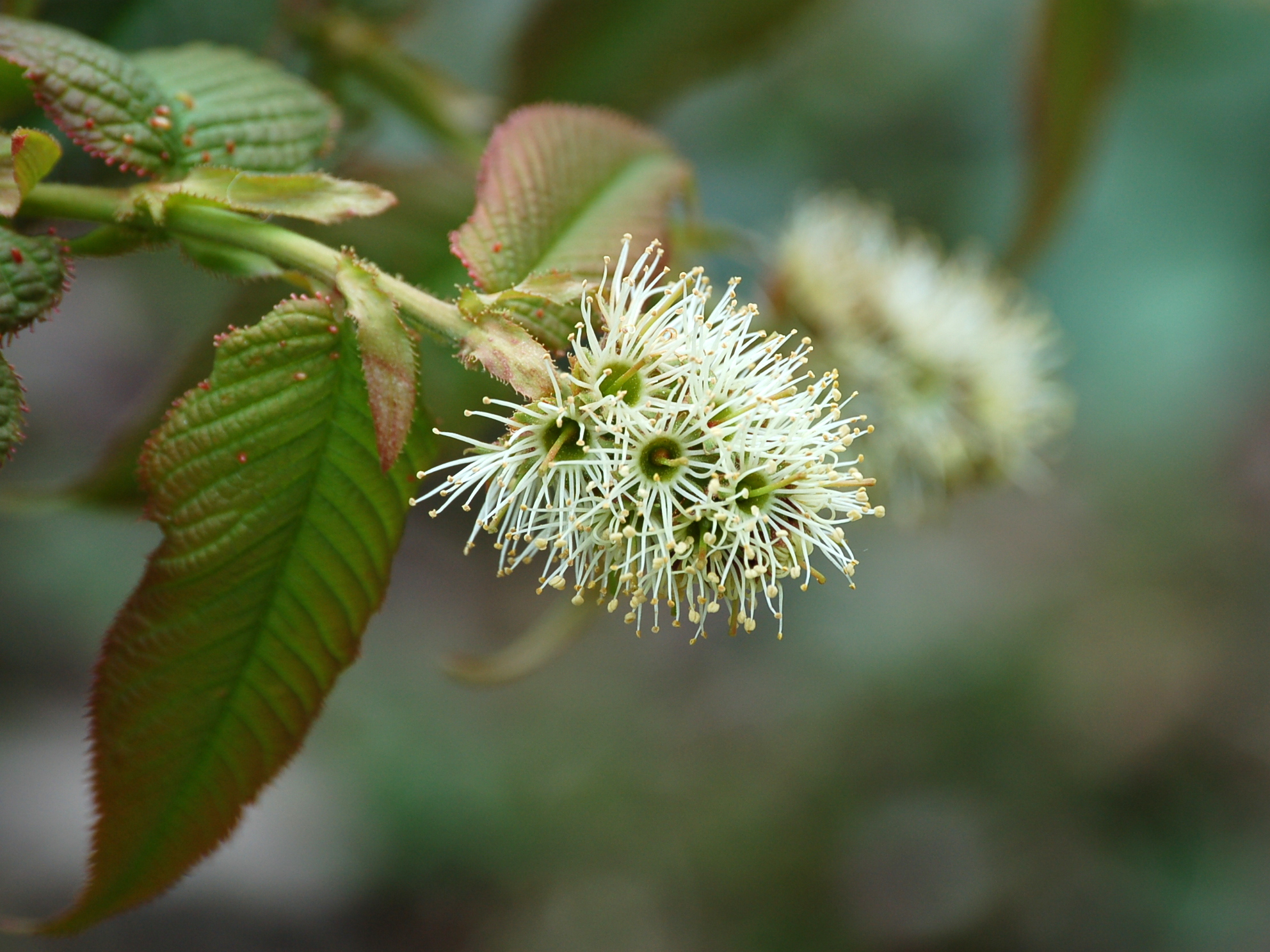

Scientific classification
- Kingdom: Plantae
- Clade: Tracheophytes
- Clade: Angiosperms
- Clade: Eudicots
- Clade: Rosids
- Order: Rosales
- Family: Rosaceae
- Genus: Prunus
- Subgenus: Prunus subg. Padus
- Species: P. himalayana

Binomial name
- Prunus himalayana J.Wen

Synonyms
- Maddenia himalaica Hook.f. & Thomson; Maddenia himalaica var. glabrifolia H. Hara

= Prunus himalayana =

Species of plant

Prunus himalayana, called jyokun shin in Tibetan and 喜马拉雅臭樱 in Chinese, is a species of Prunus native to Nepal, Bhutan, Sikkim and Tibet. It prefers to grow 2,800 to 4,200 m above sea level in the Himalayas. As Maddenia himalaica it was the type species for the now unrecognized genus Maddenia.

== Description ==
Prunus himalayana trees are 3 to 8 m tall, infrequently reaching 10 m. Branches over two years old are pubescent and have brownish-purple to brownish-red shiny bark. Branchlets under one year old have densely brown villous (eventually becoming glabrous) brownish-red bark. Winter buds are purplish-red and ovoid, featuring scales which are externally brown villous to subglabrous. Stipules are lorate-lanceolate in form and abaxially pubescent, with glandular serrate margins and acuminate apices.

Leaves are borne on densely brown villous petioles that are 2 to 5 mm long. Leaves are adaxially dark green and glabrous with impressed veins, abaxially pale green and densely brown villous especially on prominent veins but sometimes glabrous away from the veins, which number from 15 to 20. Margin teeth have an apical gland when young (see photograph above). The plants produce different leaves depending on whether the shoots bearing them are sterile or flowering. Sterile shoots have leaves that are narrowly elliptic, oblong, or rarely ovate, 1.8 to 5 cm wide and 5 to 15 cm long, with subrounded to cordate bases, aristate biserrate margins, and long acuminate to caudate apices. Flowering shoots have leaves that are ovate to ovate-lanceolate, 2 to 5 cm wide and 5 to 9.5 cm long, cordate bases, incised and simple or biserrate margins, and long acuminate to caudate apices.

Inflorescences are borne on dense racemes (10 to 20 flowers each) which are 3.5 to 6 cm long, with densely brown villous peduncles, oblong lanceolate membranous sparsely pubescent bracts, and glandular serrate margins. The bisexual flowers are 2 to 4 mm in diameter. The densely brown villous pedicels are about 2 mm long, growing to 5 mm when the fruit are fully developed, Hypanthia are externally brown villous. The outside brown villous (soon caducous) perianth segments are ovate, about 3 mm, with entire margins and acute apices. Inside, the perianth segments are subglabrous. The petals are not differentiated from the sepals. Each flower has 20 to 30 stamens, with slender styles that are more or less as long as the stamens. Stigma are disc-shaped. The ovaries are glabrous, with base persistent in fruit. Drupes are ovoid with acute apices, purple when ripe, and are about 9 mm in diameter. P. himalayana flowers in May and fruits in June.
