= Prunus schlechteri =

Scientific classification
- Kingdom: Plantae
- Clade: Tracheophytes
- Clade: Angiosperms
- Clade: Eudicots
- Clade: Rosids
- Order: Rosales
- Family: Rosaceae
- Genus: Prunus
- Species: P. schlechteri

Binomial name
- Prunus schlechteri (Koehne) Kalk.

Synonyms
- Pygeum schlechteri Koehne; Pygeum forbesii Koehne; Pygeum laurocerasus Koehne; Pygeum salomonense Merr. & L.M.Perry; Pygeum tetradenium Koehne

Species of tree

Prunus schlechteri, aimangelo, is a species of Prunus native to New Guinea and the Solomon Islands. It is a tree reaching 35 m. Native peoples chew a pulp of its bark to alleviate the pain of toothaches or apply it externally to relieve aching muscles.
