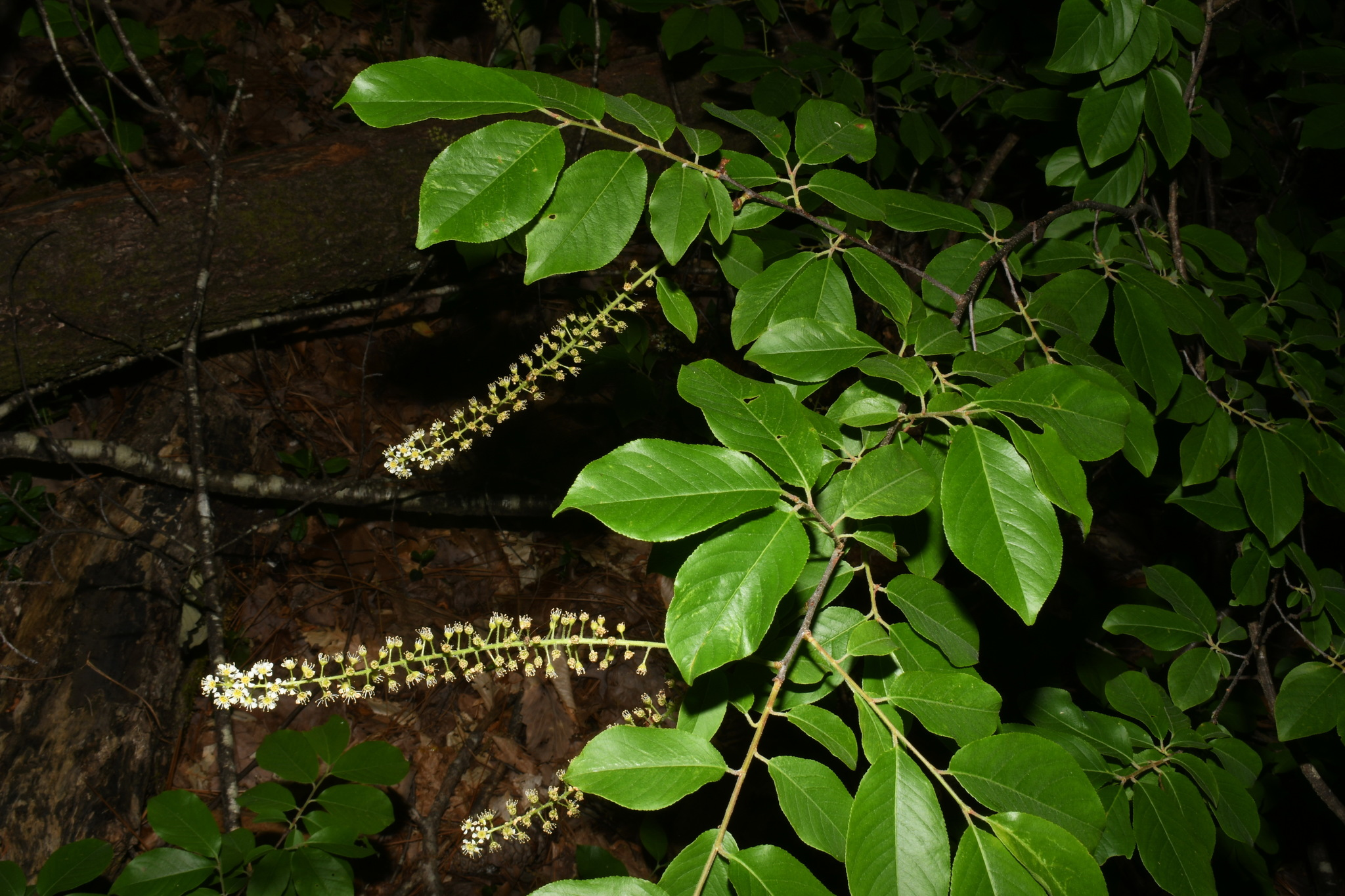

Conservation status
- Apparently Secure (NatureServe)

Scientific classification
- Kingdom: Plantae
- Clade: Embryophytes
- Clade: Tracheophytes
- Clade: Angiosperms
- Clade: Eudicots
- Clade: Rosids
- Order: Rosales
- Family: Rosaceae
- Genus: Prunus
- Subgenus: Prunus subg. Padus
- Species: P. alabamensis

Binomial name
- Prunus alabamensis C. Mohr

Synonyms
- Padus alabamensis (C.Mohr) Small; Prunus serotina var. alabamensis (C.Mohr) Little

= Prunus alabamensis =

Species of tree

Prunus alabamensis, the Alabama cherry or Alabama black cherry, is an uncommon to rare species of tree in the rose family endemic to parts of the Southeastern United States. It is closely related to and found wholly within the range of Prunus serotina (black cherry), a more common and widespread species also native to the region. Alabama cherry is sometimes considered to be a variety of P. serotina (i.e. Prunus serotina var. alabamensis), but most authors treat it as a distinct species.

== Description ==
Alabama cherry is a deciduous species. It forms a small or medium-sized tree growing to heights of 6–12 meters (20–40 feet) and a diameter of about 15 centimeters (6 inches), scarcely exceeding 7.5–9 m (25–30 ft) in height. The immature bark is gray and smooth; mature bark is rough and becomes broken into plates that are dark-gray to black in color. Young shoots or twigs are green and pubescent, often densely so, with rusty-brown hairs.

The leaves are alternate, ovate to elliptic in shape, and rounded or slightly narrowed at the base. They are usually obtuse, rounded, or emarginate at the apex, but sometimes short acuminate, abruptly acute, or acutish. They are 3–12.5 cm (1 1/4–5 in) long and 2–6.5 cm (3/4–2 1/2 in) wide, with petioles that are 2–12 millimeters (1/16–1/2 in) long. The margins are bluntly serrated with appressed teeth that have glandular tips. The upper surface of the leaf is dark green and the lower surface is a lighter green. The lower surface is uniformly but sparsely pubescent with rusty-colored hairs that are longer and more dense along the midrib but not conspicuous. The axils of veins lack tufts of hair entirely, while veinlets are prominent. The texture of the leaves is leathery. In autumn, they turn a red or orange color.

Flowers grow from the axils of leaves on elongated racemes that are 10–15 cm (4–6 in) long. The flowers have 5 small, white petals, and the rachis, peduncle, and calyx are pubescent. Flowering occurs from April to May.

The fruit is a small reddish, dark purple, or black, globose drupe, about 10 mm (3/8 in) in diameter. Fruiting occurs from June to August.

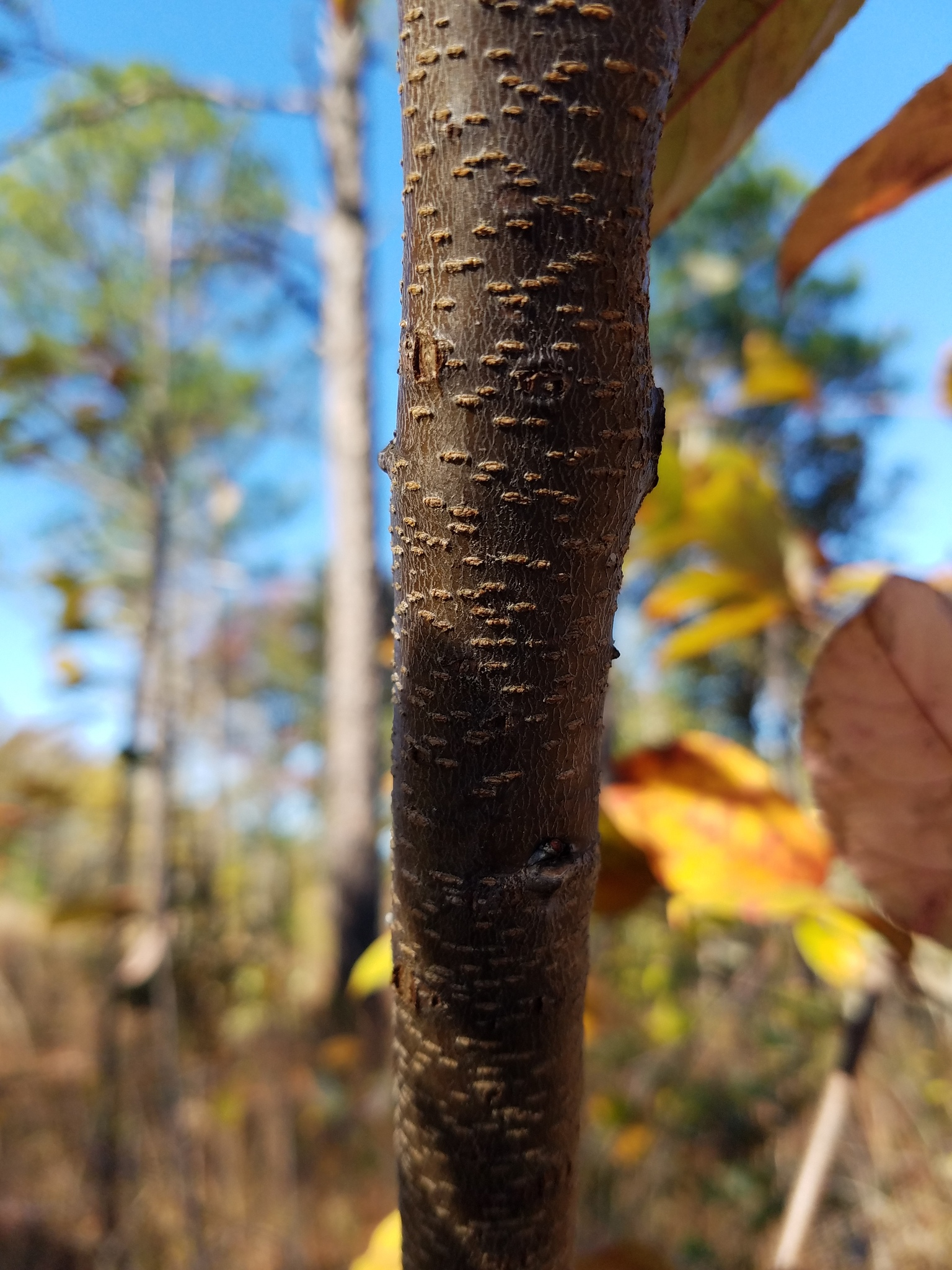
Immature bark with lenticels

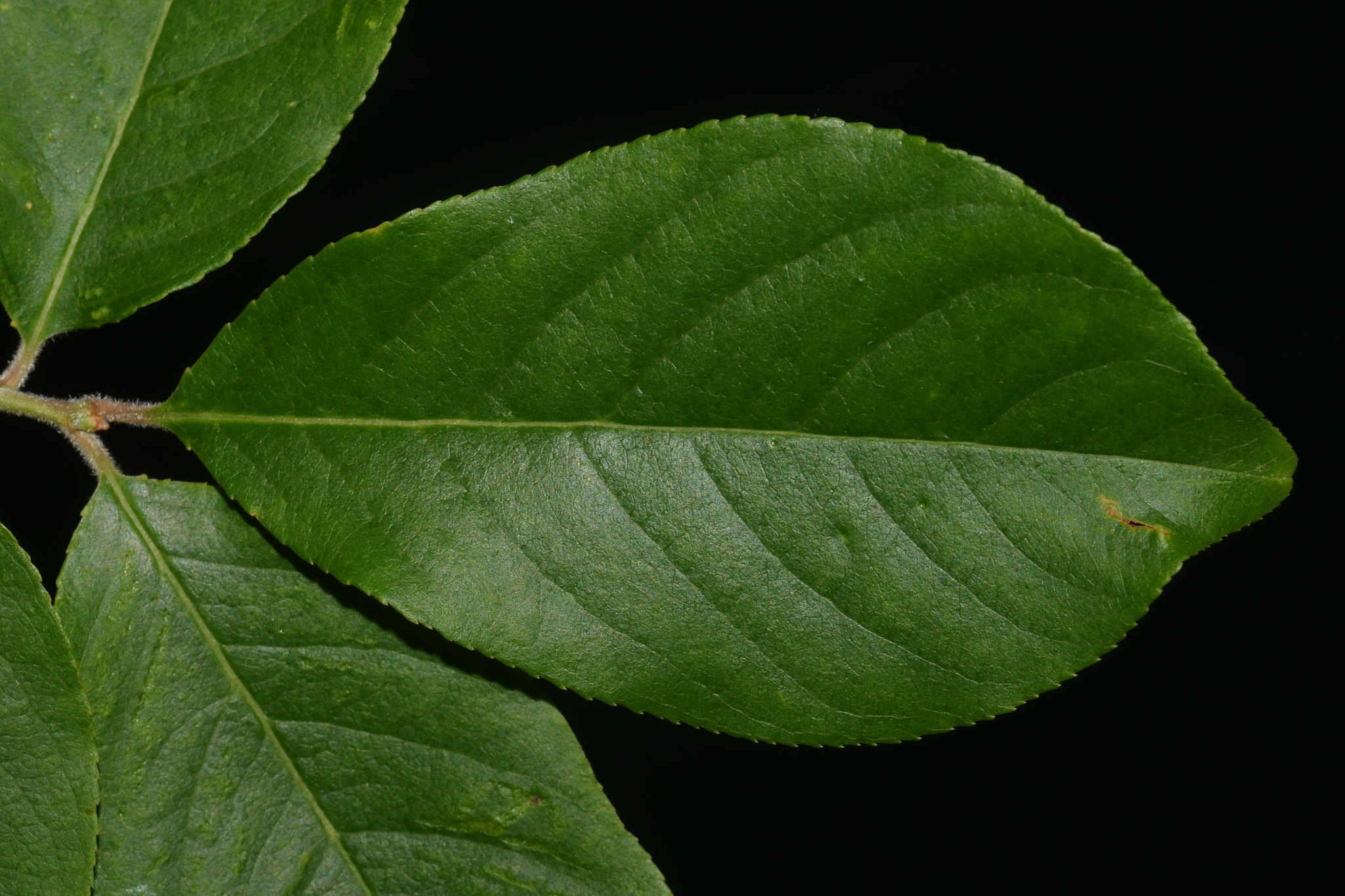
Upper surface of leaf

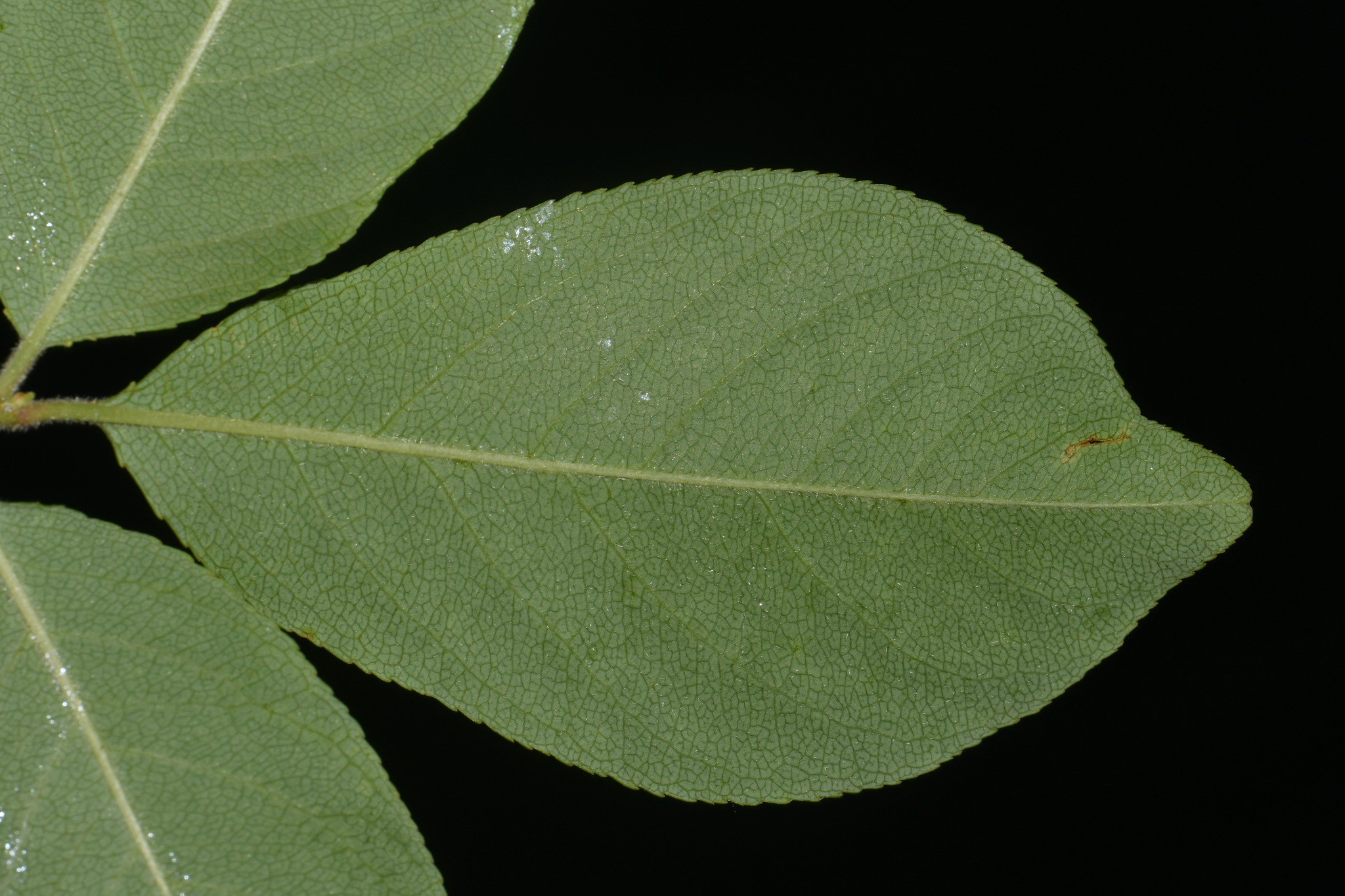
Lower surface of leaf

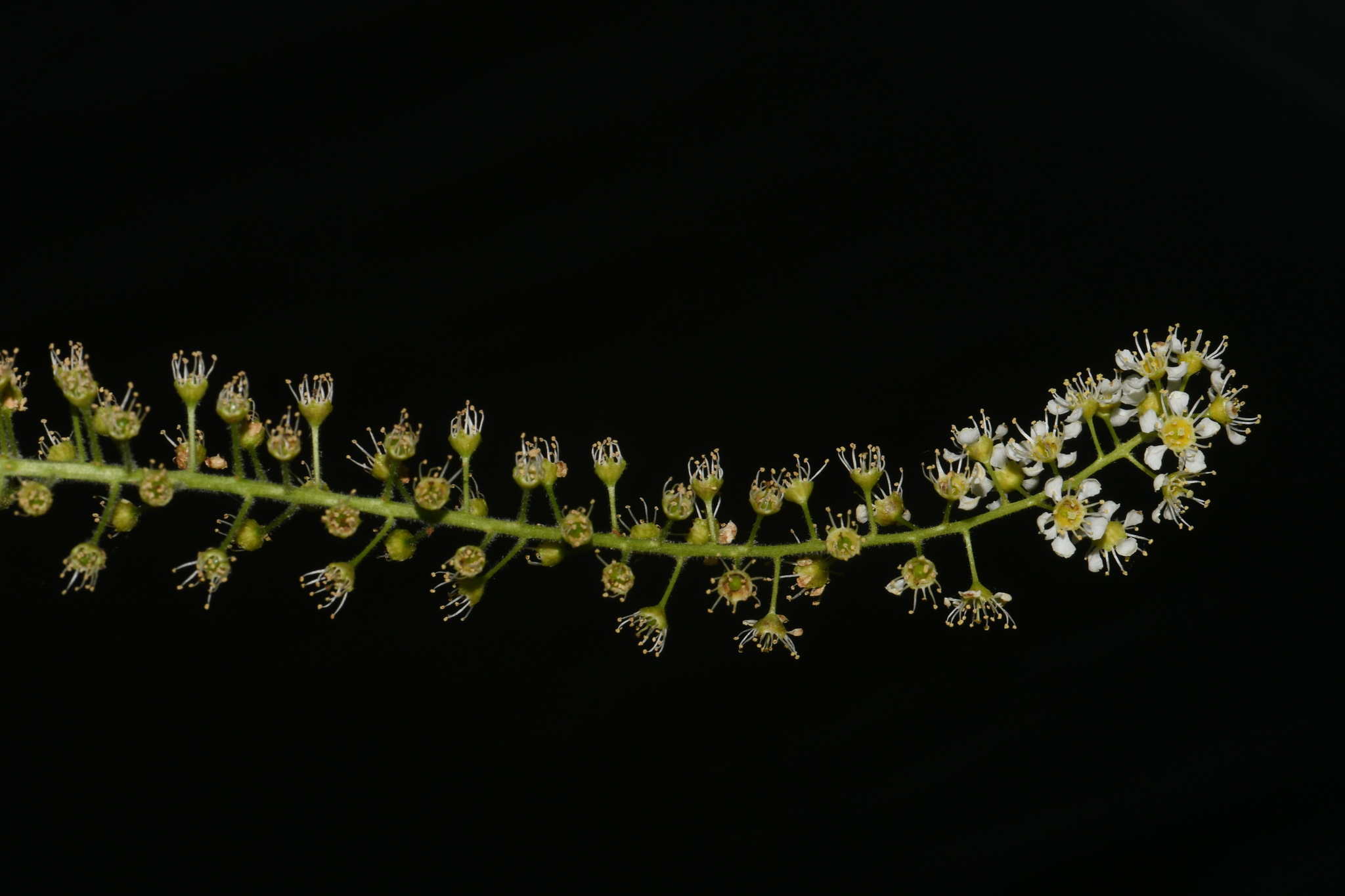
Inflorescence

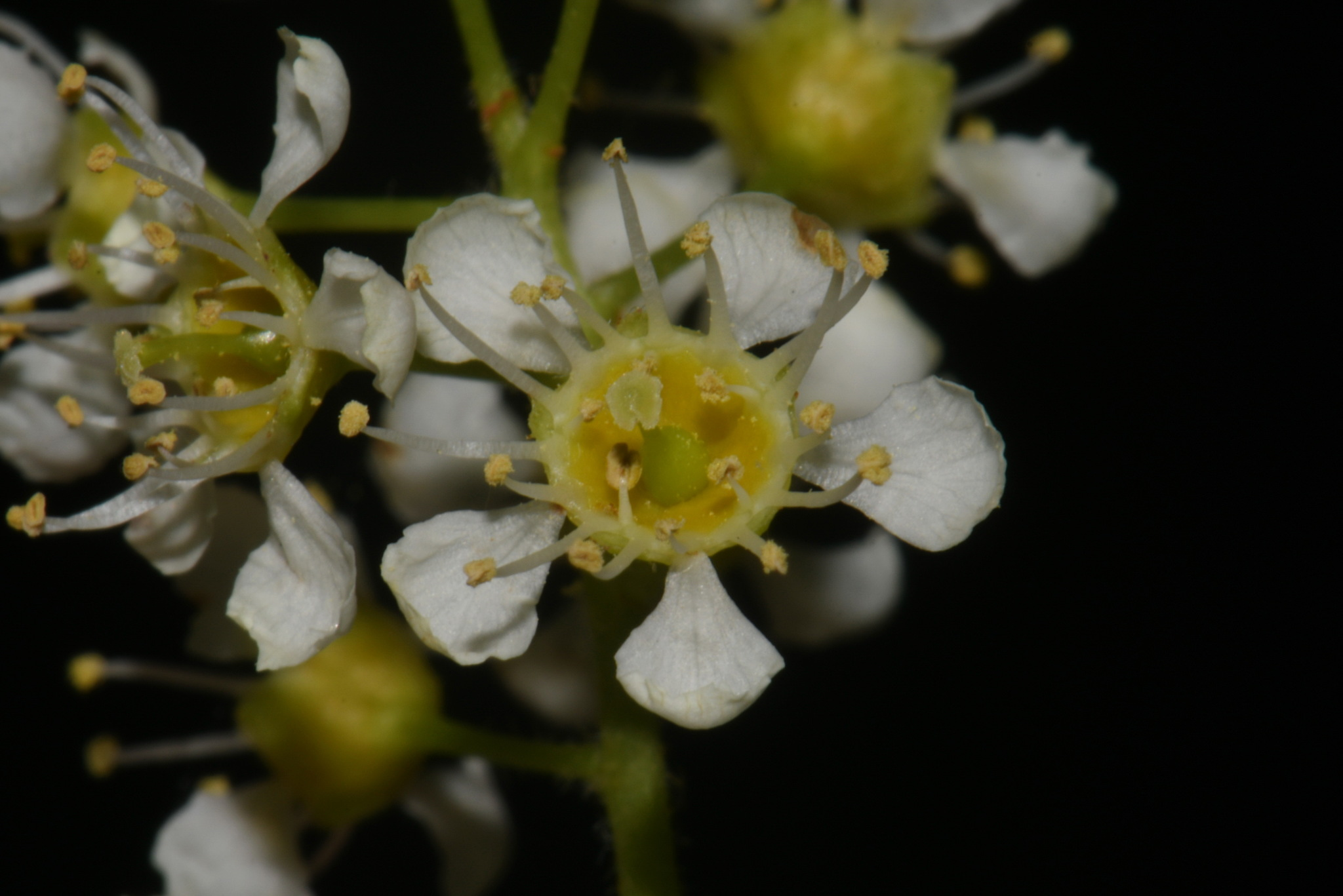
Flower

== Taxonomy ==
Alabama cherry is sympatric with its close relative Prunus serotina sensu stricto, occurring wholly within its natural range and being similar but morphologically distinct from it. They are easily distinguished from each other by the differences of their leaves and inflorescences. Alabama cherry is sometimes considered to be conspecific with P. serotina; that is, a variety or subspecies rather than its own species. For example, as of 2023, Plants of the World Online and Flora of North America classify it as P. serotina var. alabamensis, but local botanical authorities and most authors classify Alabama cherry as its own distinct species, including Auburn University, the Alabama Herbarium Consortium and University of West Alabama, and Alan S. Weakley's Flora of the Southeastern United States. The Global Biodiversity Information Facility also lists Prunus alabamensis as being the accepted name.

Phylogenetic analyses have been done on Alabama cherry to determine if it is a genetically distinct species. A 2013 analysis found no clear genetic distinction between P. serotina var. serotina from Alabama and P. alabamensis, however a following study in 2017 determined that P. alabamensis and P. serotina are indeed modestly genetically differentiated and either frequently exchange genes with each other or do not exchange genes and have only recently diverged. The study also suggested that future research should investigate what underlying factors are maintaining the phenotypic distinctiveness between the two.

== Distribution and habitat ==
Alabama cherry is known to occur in the Southeastern US states of Alabama, Florida, Georgia, Mississippi, and South Carolina. It is rare to uncommon in its range. It grows in mixed oak-pine-hickory forests in sandy or rocky dry woodlands, on rocky slopes and sandhills, and on the summits of low mountains, often associated with longleaf pine (Pinus palustris). It grows at elevations of 20–700 m (66–2,297 ft).

== Edibility ==
The fruit and seed are edible and can be eaten raw or cooked, but caution should be taken when consuming the seed as this plant belongs to a genus where most or all species produce the volatile toxin hydrogen cyanide, mostly in their leaves and seeds. The levels are usually too small to do any harm, but especially bitter fruits or seeds should not be eaten.

== Other uses ==
Green dyes can be obtained from the leaves and fruits.
