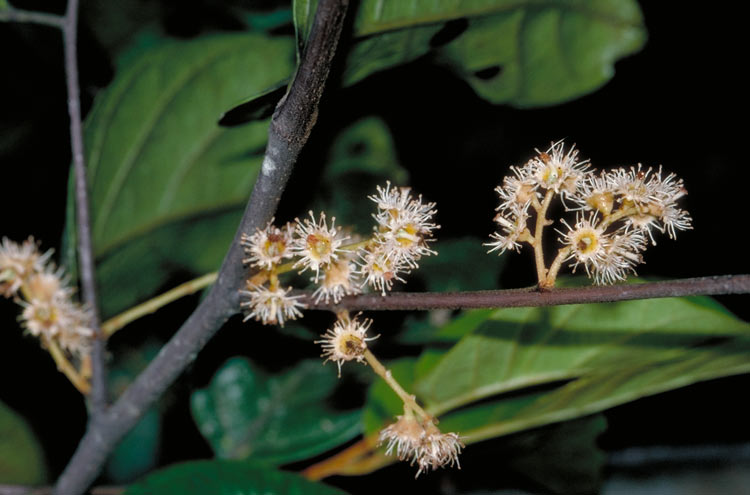

Conservation status
- Least Concern (IUCN 3.1)

Scientific classification
- Kingdom: Plantae
- Clade: Tracheophytes
- Clade: Angiosperms
- Clade: Eudicots
- Clade: Rosids
- Order: Rosales
- Family: Rosaceae
- Genus: Prunus
- Section: P. sect. Laurocerasus
- Species: P. turneriana

Binomial name
- Prunus turneriana (F.M.Bailey) Kalkman

Synonyms
- Pygeum turnerianum Kalkman; Pygeum glomeratum Koehne; Prunus glomerata (Koehne) Kalkman

= Prunus turneriana =

Almondbark

Species of plant in the rose family

Prunus turneriana is a species of plant in the rose, apple and peach family Rosaceae, native to New Guinea and Australia. Its common names include almondbark, wild almond, and joonda. The name almondbark refers to the almond-like odour emitted when the bark is cut. A late successional rainforest tree, it reaches 30 m (98 ft). The fruit is eaten by cassowaries (Casuarius casuarius), fruit pigeons (Ptilinopus spp.), Herbert River ringtail possums (Pseudochirulus herbertensis) and musky rat-kangaroos (Hypsiprymnodon moschatus).
