= Prunus pullei =

Scientific classification
- Kingdom: Plantae
- Clade: Tracheophytes
- Clade: Angiosperms
- Clade: Eudicots
- Clade: Rosids
- Order: Rosales
- Family: Rosaceae
- Genus: Prunus
- Species: P. pullei

Binomial name
- Prunus pullei (Koehne) Kalkman

Synonyms
- Pygeum pullei Koehne

Species of tree

Prunus pullei is a species of Prunus native to the highlands of New Guinea. It is a small tree, usually 15 m but reaching 24 m tall, with rough, lenticellate brown bark (occasionally gray). At higher altitudes it takes on a more shrubby growth form.

== Description ==
Its stiff-coriaceous leaves are elliptic to oblong, 1.5 to 5 cm wide and 2 to 12 cm long. Their bases are acute to rounded, with often revolute margins (when living), and obtuse, often retuse apices. There are 5 to 9 pairs of nerves, looped and joining close to the margin. The young leaves are densely hairy and usually remain hairy beneath when mature. There are usually two (occasionally four) flat basal glands. Its free stipules are narrowly triangular, 0.7 to 1.8 mm wide by 2.5 to 7 mm long.

The flowers have 15 to 40 stamens with glabrous filaments up to 7 mm long, and anthers 0.4 to 1 mm long. The ovaries are densely hairy, with (sometimes) basally hairy styles up to 5 mm long. The fruits are subglobular to transversely ellipsoid, 6 to 11 mm by 7 to 11.5 mm, with hairy exocarps and glabrous (or with some hairs inside) endocarps. When ripe the fruits are shining purplish-black, possessing a calyx (the remnant of the hypanthium) underneath the fruit 1.5 to 4 mm in diameter. In specimens from higher altitudes this calyx is enlarged up to 8 mm in diameter. Its seeds have glabrous testa.
