= Prunus wallaceana =

Scientific classification
- Kingdom: Plantae
- Clade: Tracheophytes
- Clade: Angiosperms
- Clade: Eudicots
- Clade: Rosids
- Order: Rosales
- Family: Rosaceae
- Genus: Prunus
- Species: P. wallaceana

Binomial name
- Prunus wallaceana Kalkman

Synonyms
- Pygeum wallaceanum Kalkman

Species of tree

Prunus wallaceana is a species of Prunus native to Sulawesi, the Maluku Islands and the Lesser Sunda Islands. It is a tree reaching 30 m. It goes by a number of common names, some of them shared with other species, including kenda, lepi and hedhé.
