= Prunus gazelle-peninsulae =

Scientific classification
- Kingdom: Plantae
- Clade: Tracheophytes
- Clade: Angiosperms
- Clade: Eudicots
- Clade: Rosids
- Order: Rosales
- Family: Rosaceae
- Genus: Prunus
- Species: P. gazelle-peninsulae

Binomial name
- Prunus gazelle-peninsulae (Kaneh. & Hatus.) Kalk.

Synonyms
- Pygeum gazelle-peninsulum Kaneh. & Hatus.; Pygeum platyphyllum K.Schum

Species of flowering plant

Prunus gazelle-peninsulae is a species of Prunus native to New Guinea and the Bismarck Archipelago. A few individuals have been found growing on Seram and Halmahera Islands in the Maluku Islands. It is a tree reaching 37 m (121 ft), and is morphologically similar to Prunus dolichobotrys, aside from their fruit.
