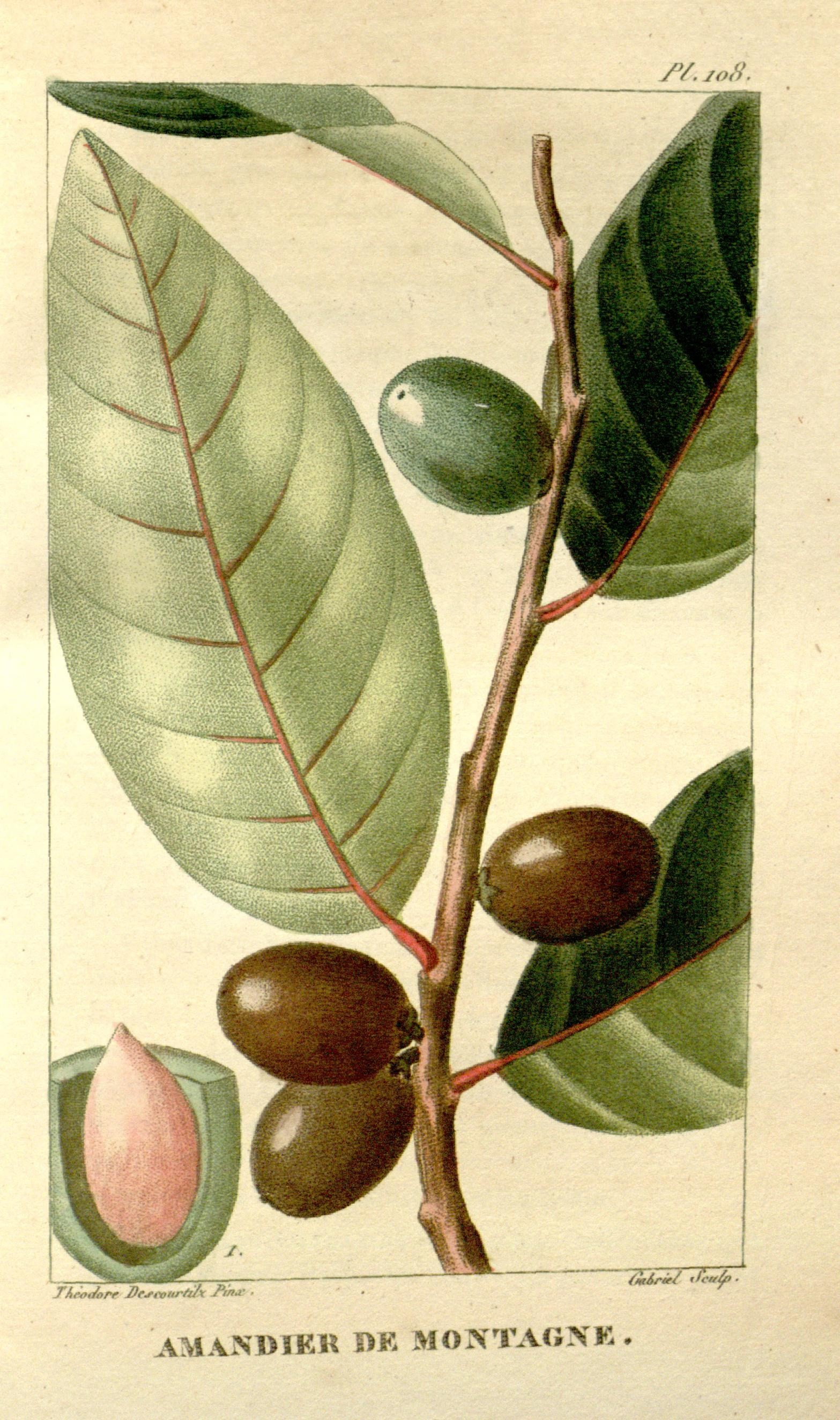

Conservation status
- Least Concern (IUCN 3.1)

Scientific classification
- Kingdom: Plantae
- Clade: Tracheophytes
- Clade: Angiosperms
- Clade: Eudicots
- Clade: Rosids
- Order: Rosales
- Family: Rosaceae
- Genus: Prunus
- Subgenus: Prunus subg. Padus
- Species: P. myrtifolia

Binomial name
- Prunus myrtifolia (L. Urb.

Synonyms
- Celastrus myrtifolius L.; Laurocerasus myrtifolia (L.) Britton; Prunus sphaerocarpa Sw.; Prunus tikalana Lundell

= Prunus myrtifolia =

Species of shrub

Prunus myrtifolia, called the West Indies cherry or myrtle laurel cherry, is a New World species of shrubs in the family Rosaceae.

== Description ==
Prunus myrtifolia is a spineless, evergreen tree up to 12 metres (40 feet) tall, not forming clumps nor hairs. The flowers are white, formed in elongated arrays of up to 30 flowers. The fruit is dark purple, almost black, and is spherical or egg-shaped.

== Distribution ==
It is native to the southeastern United States (Florida), southern Mexico, Central America, South America, and the West Indies.

== Gallery ==
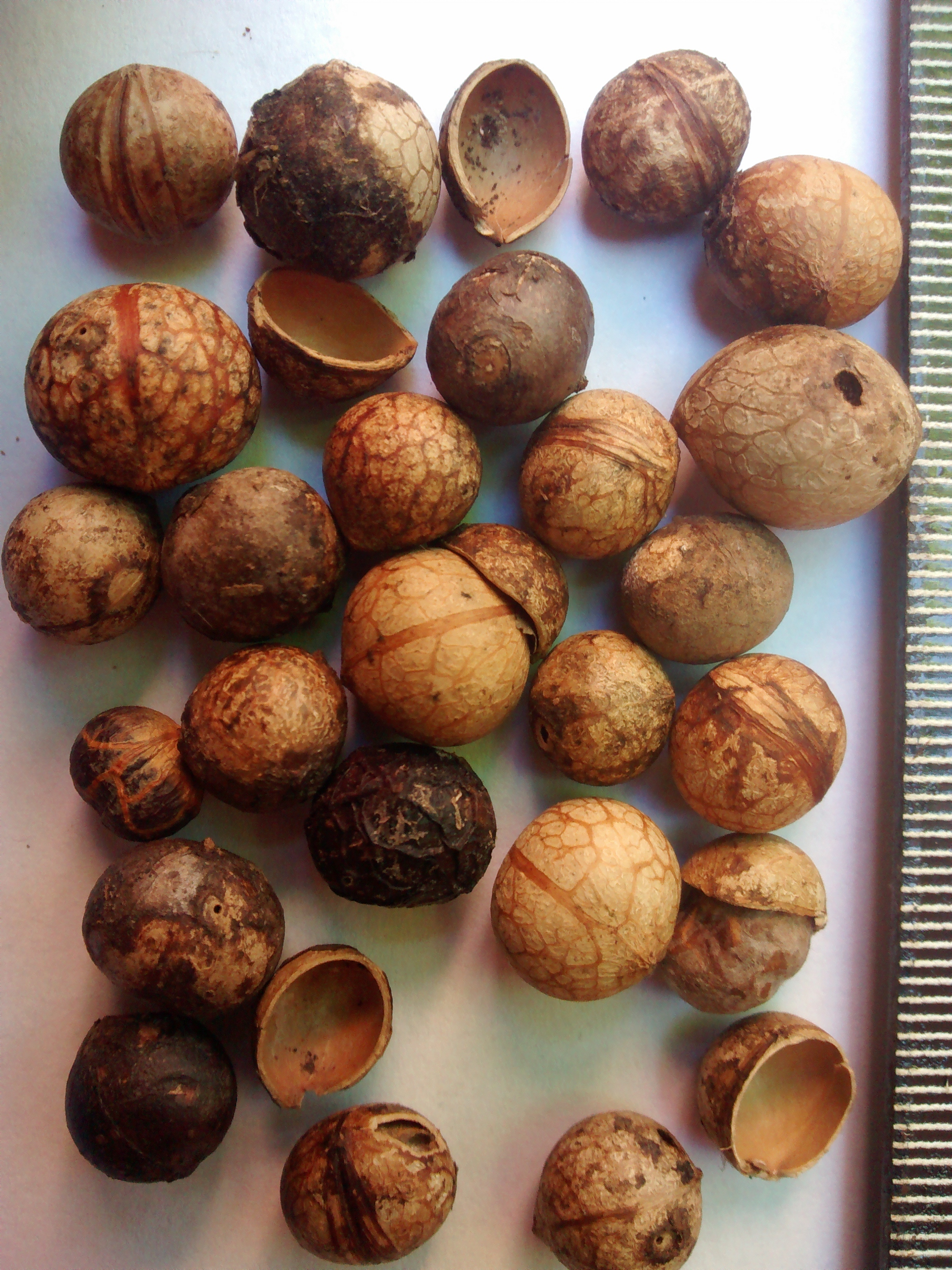
Seeds

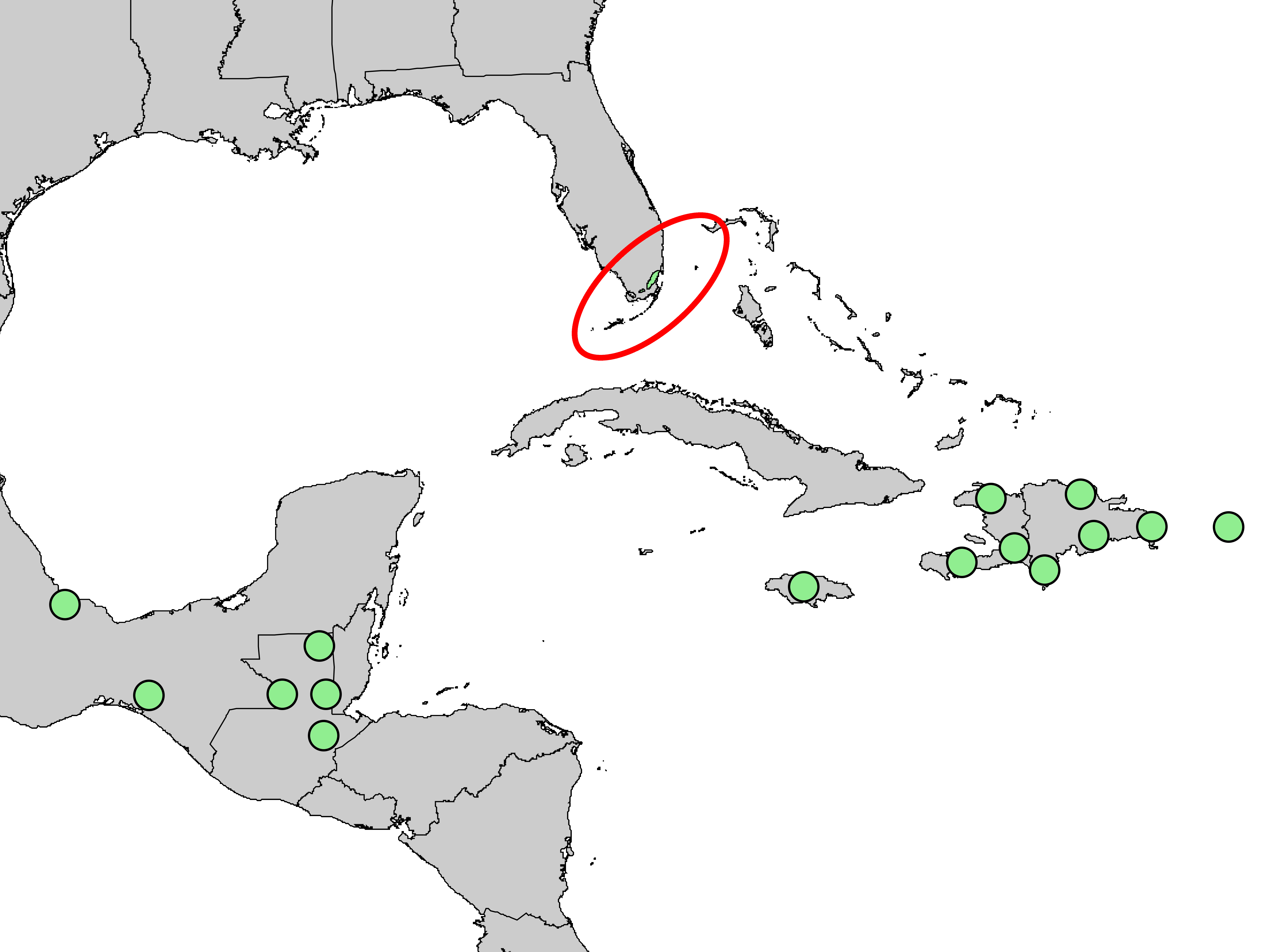
Distribution in the Americas
