= Prunus dolichobotrys =

Scientific classification
- Kingdom: Plantae
- Clade: Tracheophytes
- Clade: Angiosperms
- Clade: Eudicots
- Clade: Rosids
- Order: Rosales
- Family: Rosaceae
- Genus: Prunus
- Species: P. dolichobotrys

Binomial name
- Prunus dolichobotrys (Lauterb. & K.Schum.) Kalk.

Synonyms
- Pygeum dolichobotrys K.Schum. & Lauterb.; Combretum flavovirens Lauterb.

Species of tree

Prunus dolichobotrys is a species of Prunus native to New Guinea, the Bismarck Archipelago, and the Raja Ampat Islands. It is a tree reaching 30 m, and is morphologically very similar to Prunus gazelle‑peninsulae, aside from their fruit. Native people use its leaves in soups and other dishes for their flavor.
