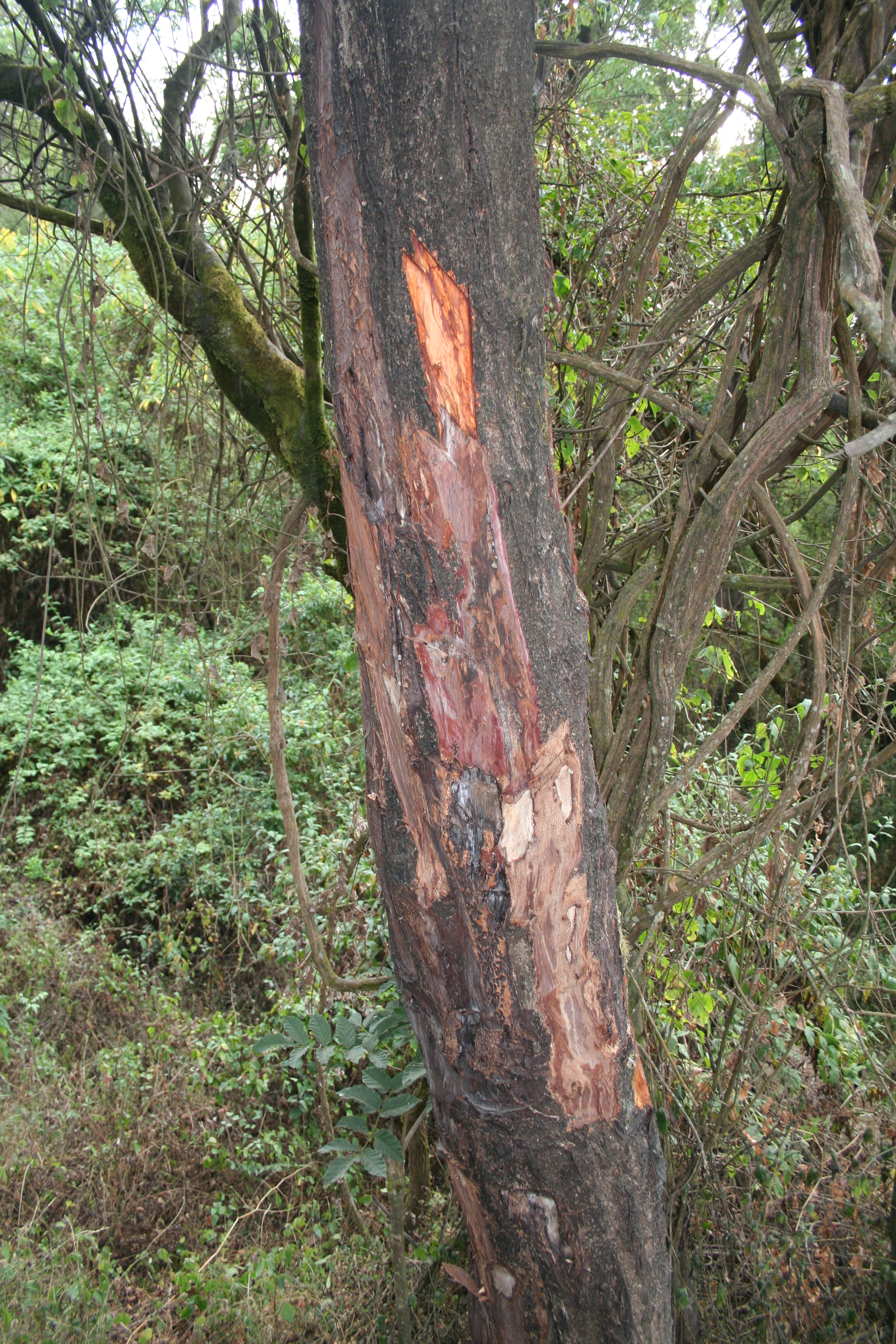
- With harvested bark, on Mount Cameroon

Conservation status
- Vulnerable (IUCN 3.1)
- CITES Appendix II

Scientific classification
- Kingdom: Plantae
- Clade: Tracheophytes
- Clade: Angiosperms
- Clade: Eudicots
- Clade: Rosids
- Order: Rosales
- Family: Rosaceae
- Genus: Prunus
- Subgenus: Prunus subg. Cerasus
- Section: P. sect. Laurocerasus
- Species: P. africana

Binomial name
- Prunus africana (Hook.f.) Kalkman
- IUCN distribution (2020)

Synonyms
- Pygeum africanum Hook.f. Pygeum crassifolium Hauman; Prunus crassifolia

= Prunus africana =

Species of tree

Prunus africana, the African cherry, is an African species of cherry growing to 40 metres (130 feet) in height.

== Description ==
It is a canopy tree 30–40 metres (98–131 feet) in height, and is the tallest member of Prunus. Large-diameter trees have impressive, spreading crowns.

The bark is gray-black and irregularly scaled, with brown and corky branches. The leaves are up to 20 centimetres (8 inches) long, elliptical, with mildly serrated margins. They are alternate, simple, bluntly or acutely pointed, glabrous, and dark green above, pale green below. A central vein is depressed on top, prominent on the bottom. The petiole is 2 cm (3/4 in) long and pink or red.

The flowers are androgynous, with 10–20 stamens, insect-pollinated, 3–8 cm (1–3 in), greenish white or buff, and are distributed in axillary racemes 7 cm (2 3/4 in) in length. The plant flowers October through May. The fruit is a round drupe about 10 millimetres (1/2 in) in length, dark red to purple when ripe, two-lobed, with a seed in each lobe. It grows in bunches ripening September through November, several months after pollination.

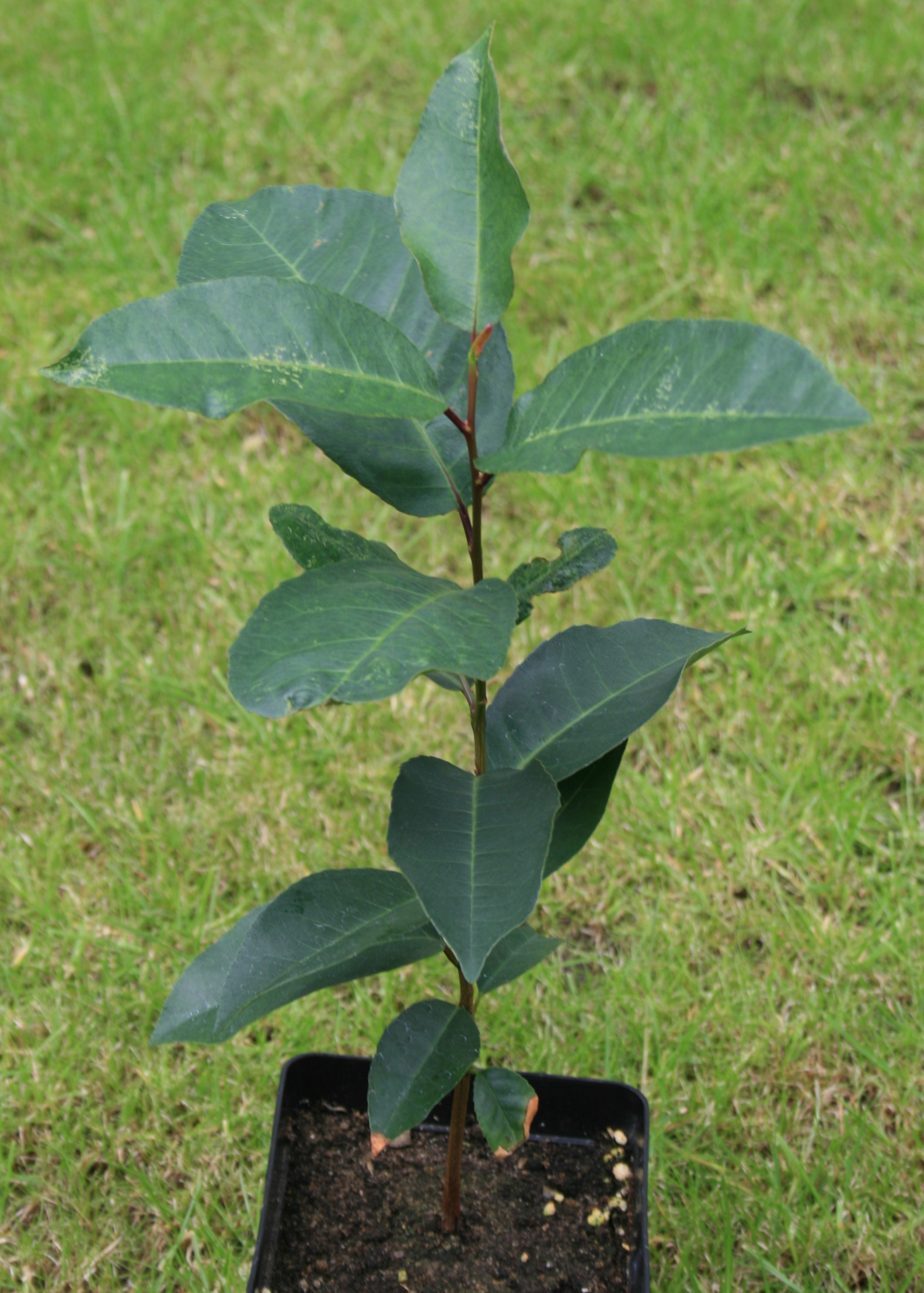
Planted sapling

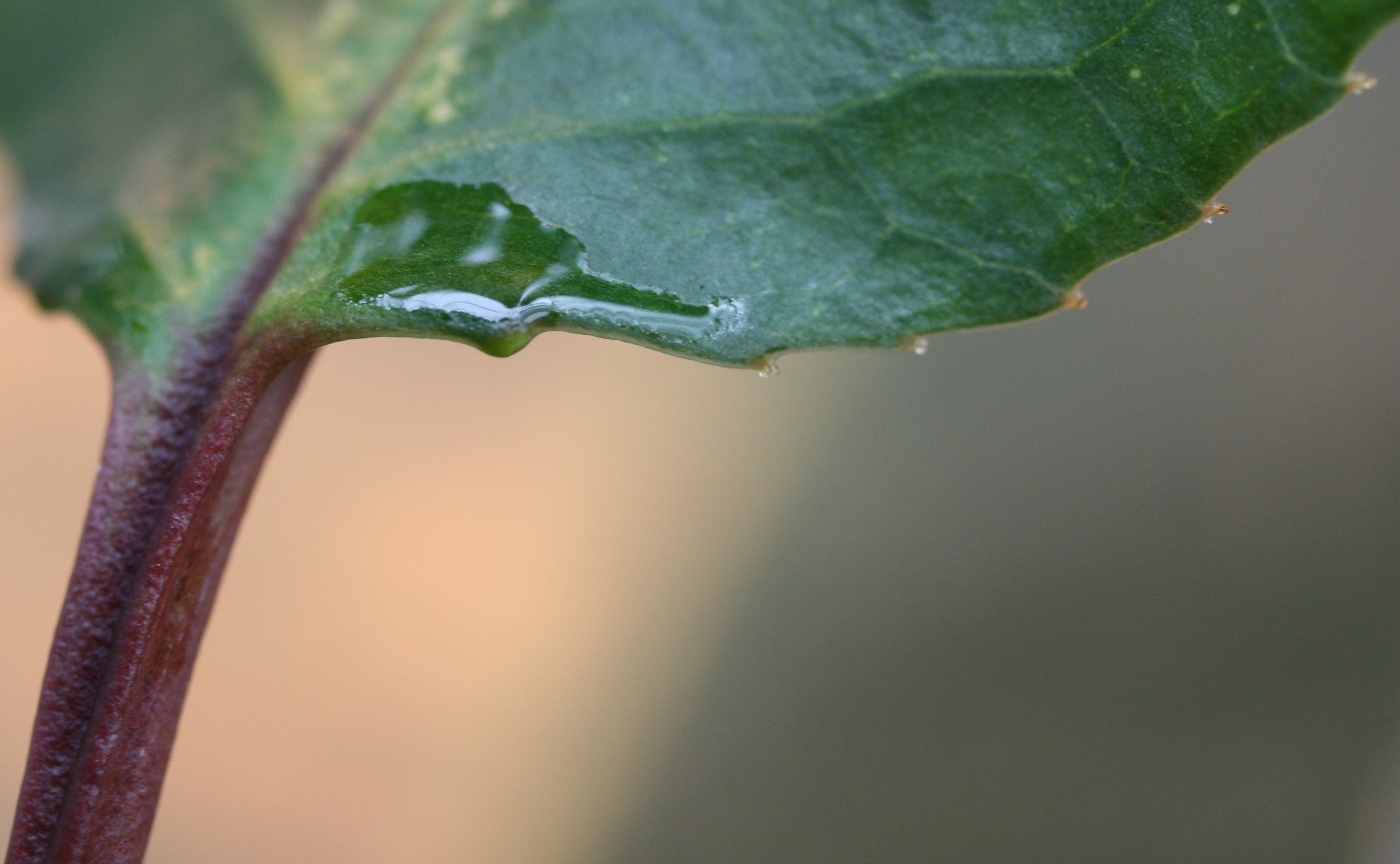
Extrafloral nectaries along leaf margin

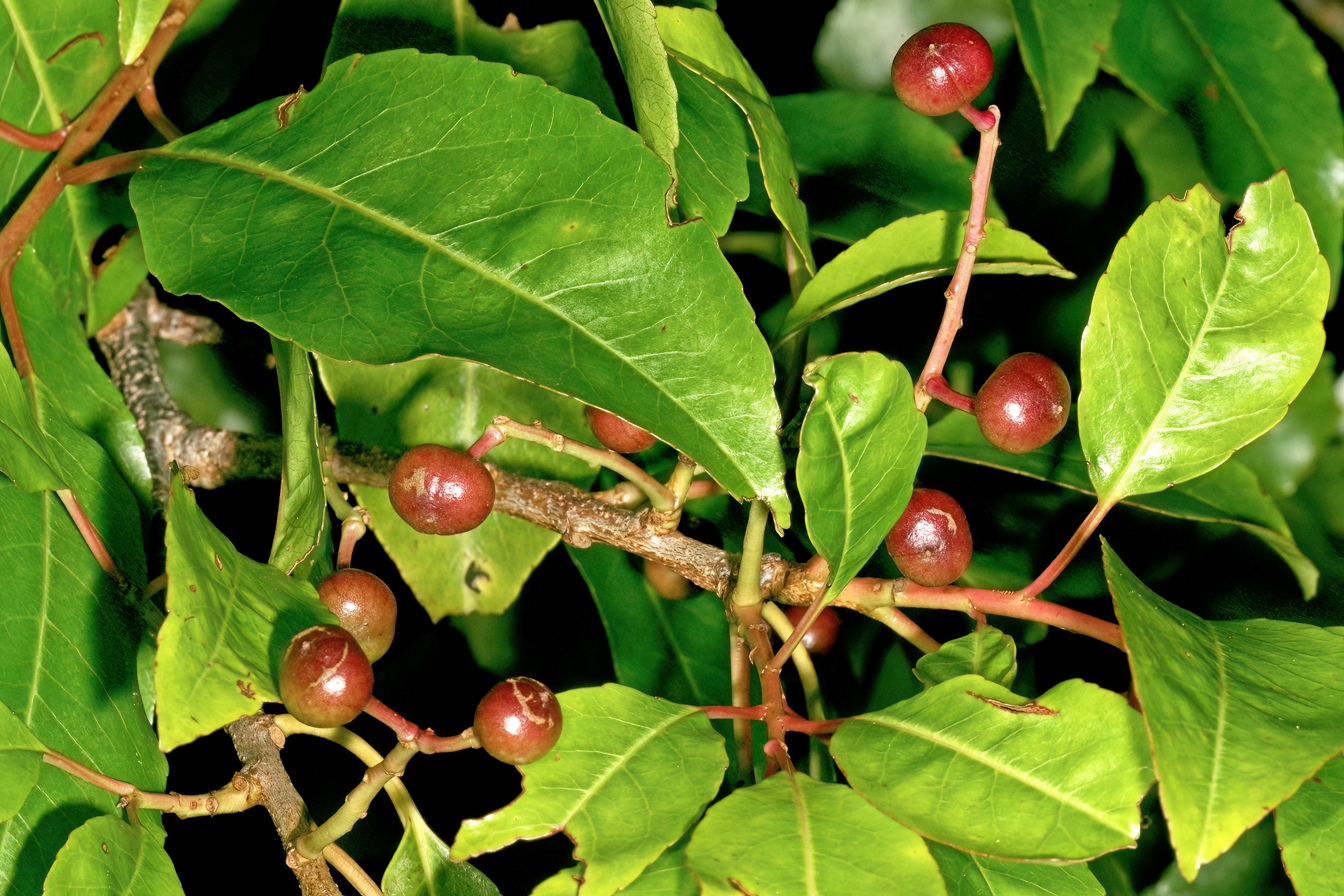
Immature fruit

== Taxonomy ==
The name of the remedy "Pygeum" comes from the name of the plant, which was discovered to botany by Gustav Mann during his now-famous first European exploration of the Cameroon Range, with Sir Richard Francis Burton and Alfred Saker, in 1861. A letter from Mann to the Linnean Society of London, read by William Jackson Hooker, then director of the Royal Botanic Gardens, Kew, on June 5, 1862, describes the naming of the peaks of the Cameroon Range (such as Mount Victoria, later Mount Cameroon) and the collection of specimens there. The latter were shipped back to Kew for classification, which was duly performed by Hooker and his son, Joseph Dalton Hooker, who had the responsibility of publishing them, as William died in 1865.

When the publication came out the Hookers had named the plant Pygeum africanum, followed by the designation "n. sp.", an abbreviation for nova species. The first publication of the synonym in 1864 had been preceded by publication of the bare name in 1863 in a book by Richard Francis Burton. Evidently Hooker had already made the contents of J. Proc. Linn. Soc., Bot. 7 for 1864 available to some, as Burton mentions the volume and Mann's letter in 1863.

Hooker gives scant hint of why he chose "pygeum", but what he does say indicates it was common knowledge among botanists. Kirk's specimen fruit was "a much-depressed sphere". By this, he undoubtedly meant to reference Joseph Gaertner's genus, Pygeum Gaertn., which innovates pygeum from a Greek word, πυγή, "rump, buttock", because the two lobes of the fruit resemble the human gluteus maximus muscles.

In 1965, Cornelis Kalkman moved Pygeum to Prunus, and this classification has the authority for now. However, a 2002 cladistic study notes of Pygeum that "its relationships to Prunus remain to be tested by molecular cladistics."

== Distribution and habitat ==
The species has a wide distribution in Africa, occurring in montane regions of central and southern Africa and on the islands of Bioko, São-Tomé, Grande Comore, and Madagascar. It can be found at 1,500–2,300 m (5,000–8,000 ft) above sea level.

It requires a moist climate, 900–3,400 mm (35–130 in) annual rainfall, and is moderately frost-tolerant. P. africana appears to be a light-demanding, secondary-forest species.

A 1994/1995 study published in 1997 by Marchant and Taylor did a pollen analysis on and radiocarbon-dated two core samples from montane Mubindi Swamp in Uganda. The swamp is a catchment at 2,100 m (6,900 ft) altitude between mountain ridges. It is a "moist lower montane forest" in Bwindi Forest National Park. The investigators found montane Prunus, represented by currently growing P. africana, has been in the catchment continuously since their Pollen Zone MB6.1, dated about 43,000–33,000 years ago.

== Ecology ==
As with other members of the genus Prunus, Prunus africana possesses extrafloral nectaries that provide antiherbivore insects with a nutrient source in return for protecting the foliage.

Prunus africana is an important food source for frugivorous birds and mammals. Dian Fossey reports of the mountain gorilla: "The northwestern slopes of Visoke offered several ridges of Pygeum africanum ... The fruits of this tree are highly favored by gorillas." East African Mammals reports that stands of Pygeum are the habitat of the rare Carruther's mountain squirrel, and asserts, "This forest type tends to have a rather broken canopy with many trees smothered in climbers and dense tangles of undergrowth."

Large numbers of trees are harvested for their bark to meet the international demand based on its medicinal qualities. Early studies on the effects of bark harvest showed that the harvest affected population structure, increased mortality, and decreased fecundity. However, quantitative studies to examine specific life history parameters and possible sustainable harvesting practices were begun only recently and 2009). In these later studies, the combined factors of mortalities of a large percentage of reproductive trees (especially the largest ones), highly reduced fruit production, and poor seedling survival seem to suggest a bleak prognosis for future regeneration and long-term persistence of the species in harvested populations.

== Conservation ==
The collection of mature bark for its use in traditional medicine and other uses has resulted in the species becoming vulnerable. P. africana continues to be taken from the wild, but quotas have been awarded by the South African Forestry Department without adequate forest inventories due to some harvesters, spurred on by the high prices, removing too much of the bark in an unsustainable manner. In the 1990s, an estimated 35,000 debarked trees were being processed annually. The growing demand for the bark has led to the cultivation of the tree for its medicinal uses. The species has been listed in Appendix II of CITES since 16 February 1995 to regulate its international trade and is protected in South Africa under the National Forests Act (Act 84) of 1998.

== Uses ==
=== Traditional and alternative medicine ===
The species has a long history of traditional uses. The bark is used in numerous ways: as a wound dressing, a purgative, or an appetite stimulant, and to treat fevers, malaria, arrow poisoning, stomach pain, kidney disease, gonorrhoea, and insanity.

The extract called pygeum is a herbal remedy prepared from the bark of P.&nbps;africana and is promoted as an alternative medicine for benign prostatic hyperplasia (BPH). A 2016 literature review found that pygeum offered no benefit. A 2019 review said it showed some evidence of BPH symptom relief.

=== Other uses ===
The timber is a hardwood employed in the manufacture of axe and hoe handles, utensils, wagons, floors, chopping blocks, carving boards, bridge decks, and furniture. The wood is tough, heavy, straight-grained, and pink, with a pungent bitter-almond smell when first cut, turning mahogany and odourless later.

== Common names ==
Prunus africana is known by the common names African cherry, pygeum (from its former scientific name, Pygeum africanum), iron wood, red stinkwood, African plum, African prune, African almond and bitter almond. In other languages spoken where it grows, it is known as tikur inchet in Amharic, kotofihy in Malagasy, mkonde-konde in Chagga, mũiri in Kikuyu, entasesa or ngwabuzito in Ganda, uMkakase in Xhosa, inyazangoma-elimnyama or umdumezulu in Zulu, tendwet in Nandi (Kalenjin), rooi-stinkhout in Afrikaans, agbalumo in yoruba and udara in igbo.
