= Bernhard Adalbert Emil Koehne =

German botanist (1848–1918)

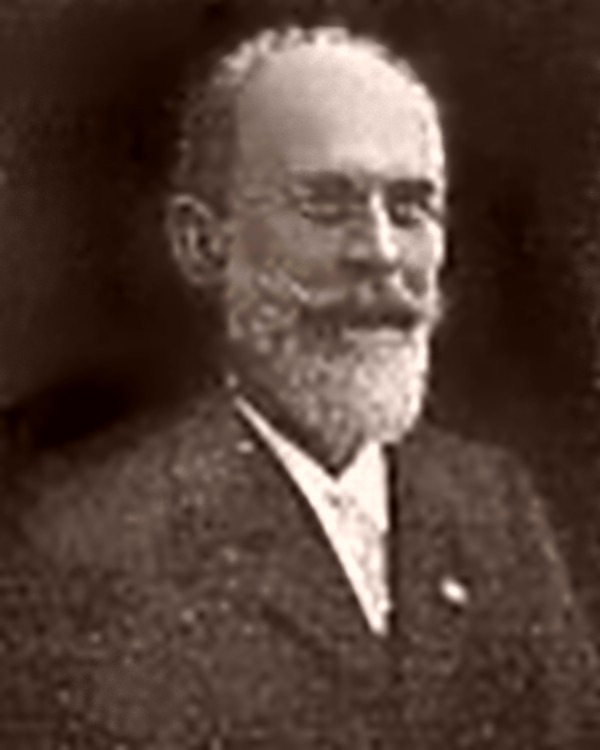
Bernhard Adalbert Emil Koehne

Bernhard Adalbert Emil Koehne (12 February 1848 – 12 October 1918) was a German botanist and dendrologist born near Striegau, a town known today as Strzegom, Poland.

Koehne was a professor of botany in Berlin and was a leading authority of the plant family Lythraceae. In Adolf Engler's treatise Das Pflanzenreich ("The Plant Kingdom"), he was author of the chapter on Lythraceae. He also made important contributions involving Lythraceae to Engler and Karl Prantl's Die Natürlichen Pflanzenfamilien ("The Natural Plant Families"), as well as to Karl Friedrich Philipp von Martius' Flora Brasiliensis.

Another noted written effort by Koehne was the 1893 Deutsche Dendrologie ("German Dendrology").

Two plant genera have been named in his honor; Koehneola from Cuba, in the (family Asteraceae) was named in 1901, and Koehneria from Madagascar, in the family Lythraceae in 1987.

Koehne edited and distributed the exsiccata Herbarium dendrologicum adumbrationibus illustratum.
