= Cornelis Kalkman =

Dutch botanist

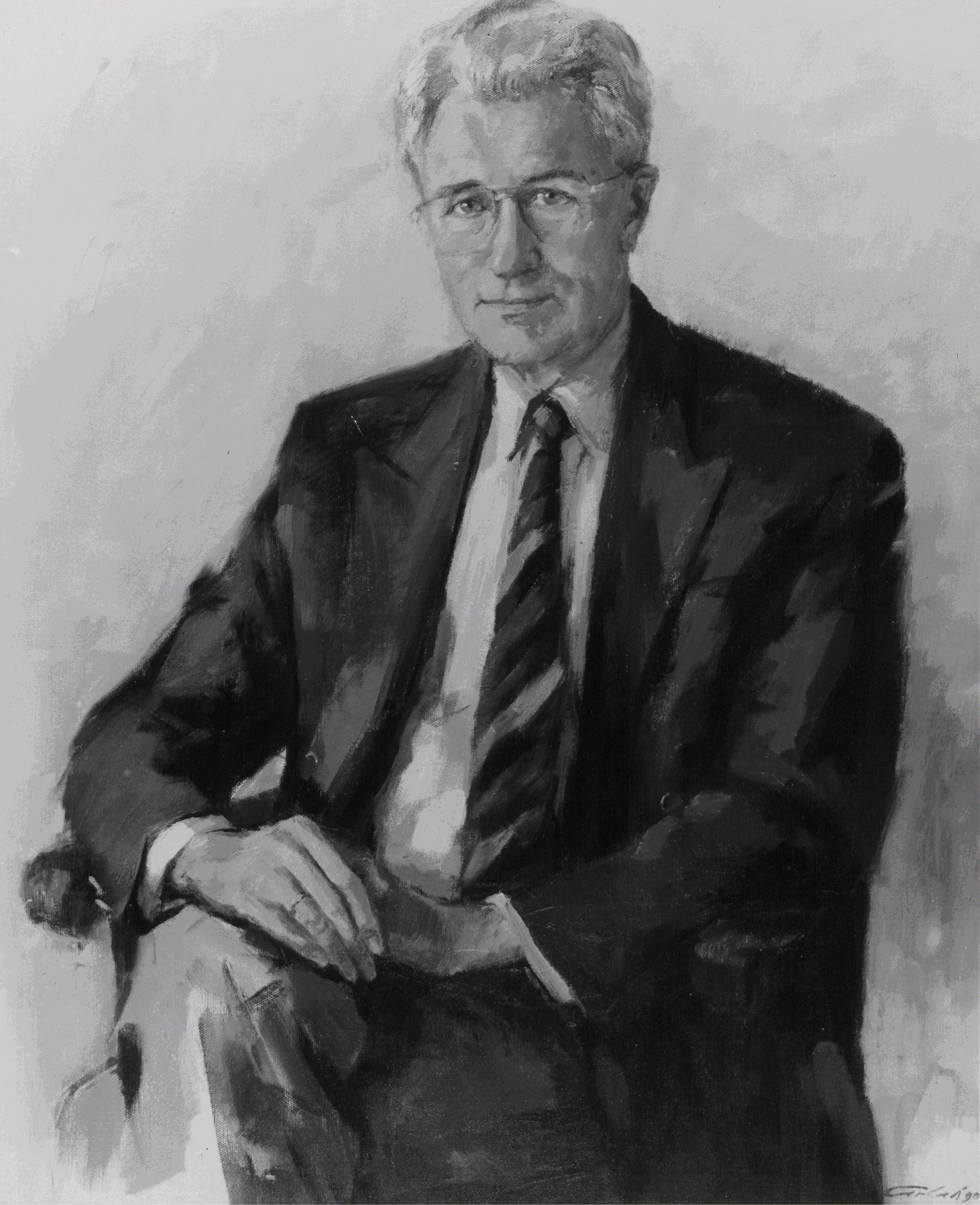
Kalkman (painting by Rodenberg, 1991)

Cornelis Kalkman (5 May 1928 in Delft – 19 January 1998, Leiden) was a Dutch botanist.
