= Annobonae =

Annobonae is Latin for "of the island of Annobón", it may refer to a number of species found on the island and in the surrounding waters:

- Coptops annobonae, a species of beetle
- Monochamus annobonae, a species of beetle
- Pterolophia annobonae, a species of beetle
- Thecacoris annobonae, synonym of Thecacoris trichogyne, a species of plant
- Xylotrechus annobonae, a species of longhorn beetle

== See also ==
- Annobonensis (disambiguation)
