= Annobonensis =

Annobonensis is Latin for "of the island of Annobón", it may refer to several species found on the island and in the surrounding waters:

- Alvania annobonensis, a species of minute sea snail
- Afroablepharus annobonensis, the Annobón lidless skink, a skink species
- Anchicubaris annobonensis, a species of woodlice
- Chrysallida annobonensis, a species of pyrams
- Congophiloscia annobonensis, a species of land crustacean isopods
- Mitrella annobonensis, a species of dove snails
- Muricopsis annobonensis a species of murex snails
- Sphodromantis annobonensis, a species of praying mantis

It also may refer to a subspecies:

- Platybelone argalus annobonensis, a subspecies of the keeltail needlefish (Platybelone argalus)

== Synonyms ==
- Ficus annobonensis, subspecies of Ficus thonningii, a figtree species
- Peperomia annobonensis, synonym of Peperomia vulcanica, a pepperflower species found in West Africa

== See also ==
- Annobonae (disambiguation)
