= Coptops purpureomixta =

Scientific classification
- Kingdom: Animalia
- Phylum: Arthropoda
- Class: Insecta
- Order: Coleoptera
- Suborder: Polyphaga
- Infraorder: Cucujiformia
- Family: Cerambycidae
- Genus: Coptops
- Species: C. purpureomixta

Binomial name
- Coptops purpureomixta (Pic, 1926)

Synonyms
- Mutatocoptops purpureomixta Pic, 1926

Species of beetle

Coptops purpureomixta is a species of beetle in the family Cerambycidae. It was described by Maurice Pic in 1926, originally under the genus Mutatocoptops. It is known from Vietnam.
