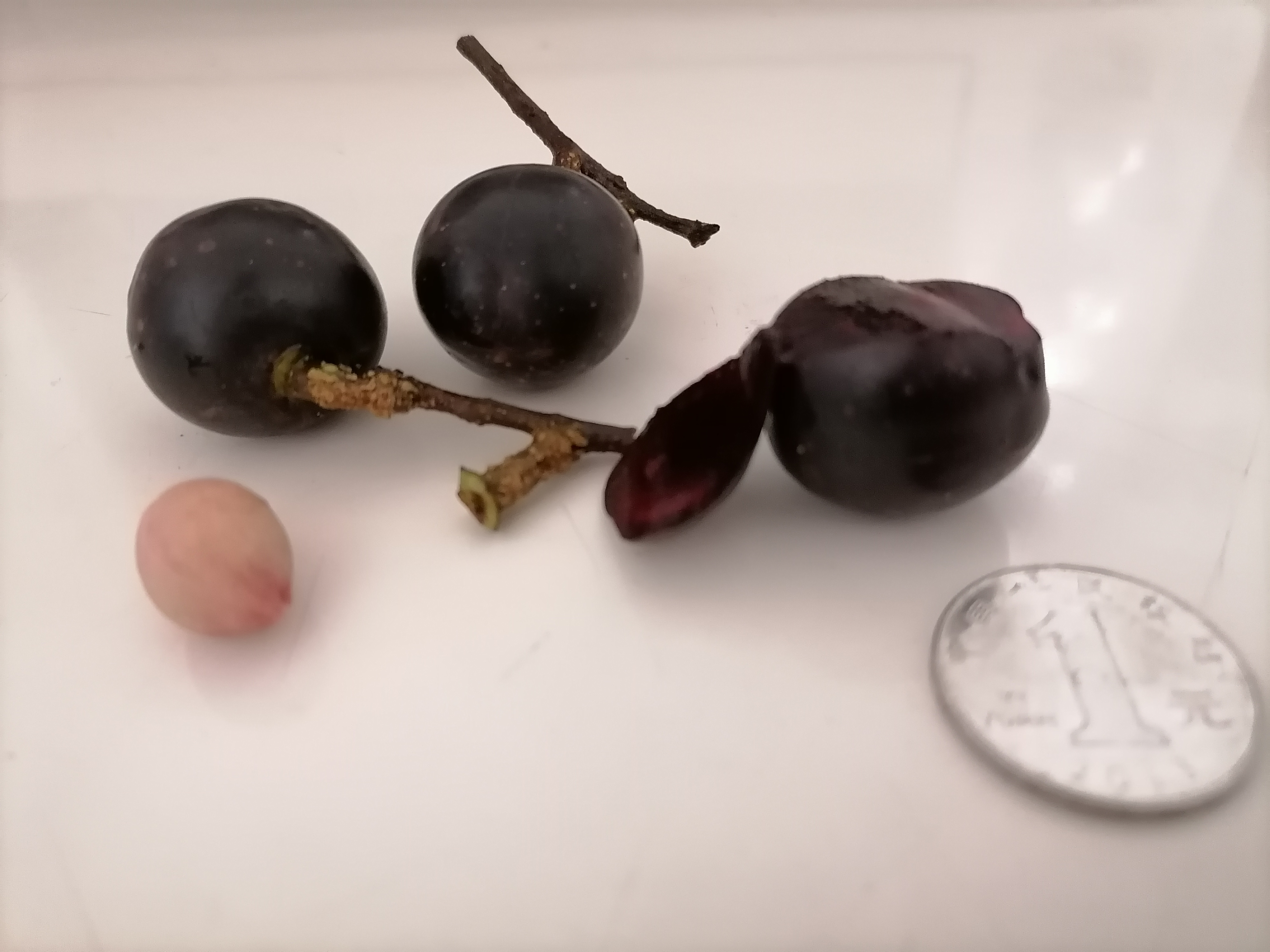
- Prunus napaulensis fruit and seed

Scientific classification
- Kingdom: Plantae
- Clade: Tracheophytes
- Clade: Angiosperms
- Clade: Eudicots
- Clade: Rosids
- Order: Rosales
- Family: Rosaceae
- Genus: Prunus
- Subgenus: Prunus subg. Padus
- Species: P. napaulensis

Binomial name
- Prunus napaulensis (Ser.) Steud. (Note: Note the misspelling of the specific epithet by von Steudel as nepaulensis)

Synonyms
- Cerasus glaucifolia Wall.; Cerasus napaulensis Ser.; Padus glaucifolia Wall.; Padus glaucifolia Wall. ex M.Roem.; Padus napaulensis (Ser.) C.K.Schneid.; Prunus glaucifolia Wall.

= Prunus napaulensis =

Species of tree

Prunus napaulensis is a species of bird cherry native to the eastern foothills of the Himalayas, including Nepal, Myanmar and China. A tree, it can reach 27 m and prefers to grow between 1800 and 3000 m above sea level. The fruit is edible, and it is cultivated for its fruit in Assam and Ukhrul District, Manipur (and presumably elsewhere). (Note: Note the misspelling of the specific epithet by Dipankar et al. as nepalensis) Its wood is used locally for making furniture. It goes by many common names across its range, including jangali aru and arupate (Nepalese), arupaty (Bengali), sohiong (Khasi), sajong (Assamese), theikanthei in Tangkhul, and 粗梗稠李 "crude stalk thick plum" (Chinese). Prunus bracteopadus is a very similar species, possibly conspecific.
