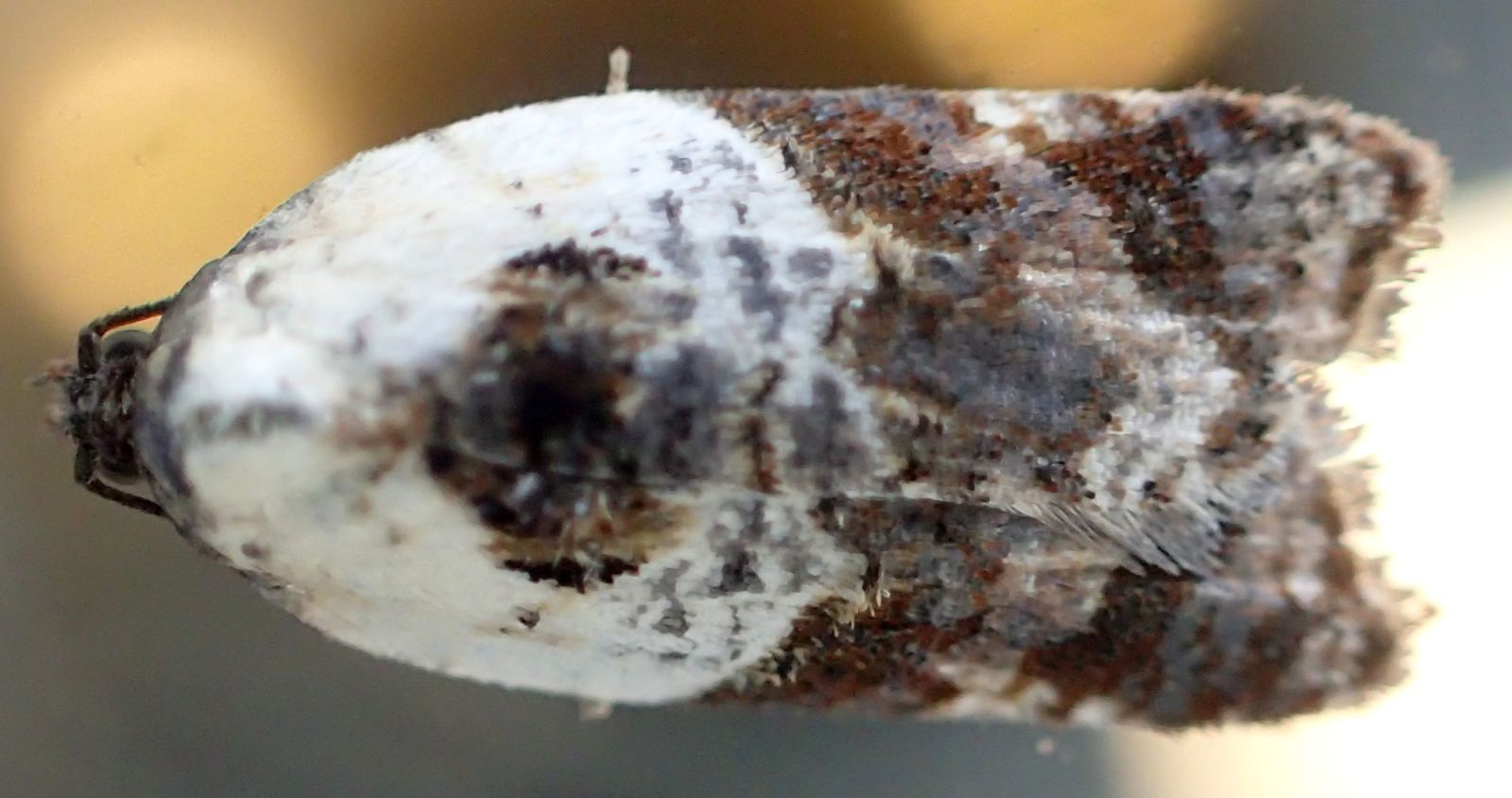

Scientific classification
- Kingdom: Animalia
- Phylum: Arthropoda
- Clade: Pancrustacea
- Class: Insecta
- Order: Lepidoptera
- Family: Tortricidae
- Genus: Acleris
- Species: A. variegana

Binomial name
- Acleris variegana (Denis & Schiffermüller, 1775)

Synonyms
- List: Peronea variegana; Acalla variegana; Tortrix variegana [Denis & Schiffermuller], 1775; Peronea albana Humphreys & Westwood, 1845; Acalla variegana f. alpicolana Weber, 1945; Peronea variegana f. argentana Sheldon, 1931; Pyralis asperana Fabricius, 1776; Teras aspersana Wood, 1839; Tortrix blandiana Charpentier, 1821; Peronea variegana f. brunneana Sheldon, 1931; Acalla variegana ab. caeruleoatrana Strand, 1916; Peronea cirrana Curtis, 1834; Peronea costimaculana Stephens, 1829; Peronea (Lopas) costimaculana Stephens, 1834; Peronea variegana f. fuscana Sheldon, 1931; Tortrix (Teras) insignata Herrich-Schaffer, 1851; Tortrix nyctemerana Hubner, [1814-1817]; Teras nycthemerana Frey, 1880; Tortrix osbeckiana Thunberg & Borgstrm, 1784; Acalla variegana ab. uniformis Schawerda, 1936

= Acleris variegana =

Species of moth

Acleris variegana, the garden rose tortricid moth or fruit tortricid, is a moth of the family Tortricidae. It has a Palearctic distribution. The moth flies from July to September mainly at night and is attracted to bright lights. The larvae feed on various trees and shrubs including rose and apple.

== Morphology ==
The fore wing is parallel-sided with an oblique external margin. The basal half is white or yellowish-white and there is a grayish-brown triangular spot close to the wing root. The distal part of the wing is reddish- or violet-brown, edged by a narrow grayish-yellow strip. The hind wing is brownish-gray. The wingspan is 14–20 millimetres (0.55–0.79 in). Julius von Kennel provides a full description.

== Biology ==
The eggs are oval, light yellow for the summer generation and milky-white or orange for over-wintering eggs. The larva is yellowish with a shiny brown head. The pupa is 8–9 mm (0.31–0.35 in) long. Hatching caterpillars in spring eat fruit buds. Later they tie leaves into bundles with the help of webbing that they spin. They can skeletonize young leaves and also do damage to buds, flowers, ovaries and unripe fruits. In spring, eggs are laid in large batches. Moths of summer generations lay eggs one by one or in small batches of three to six eggs on leaves, petioles and shoots. Over-wintering eggs are found close to fruit buds.

== Distribution ==
This is a common species all over Europe and can also be found in Northern and Central Asia, China, Japan and North America.

== Economic significance ==
The species is a significant pest of plants in the rose family including the rose, apple, pear, plum, sloe and apricot where it is mainly the first generation larvae that do the most damage. Caterpillars also cause damage to quince, cherry, hawthorn, almonds, cotoneaster and bird cherry. Other species on which they occasionally feed include hazel, oak, elm, willow and shrubs of the genus Vaccinium. They can be controlled by chemical or biological methods.
