= Mutatocoptops anancyloides =

Scientific classification
- Kingdom: Animalia
- Phylum: Arthropoda
- Class: Insecta
- Order: Coleoptera
- Suborder: Polyphaga
- Infraorder: Cucujiformia
- Family: Cerambycidae
- Genus: Mutatocoptops
- Species: M. anancyloides

Binomial name
- Mutatocoptops anancyloides (Schwarzer, 1925)

Synonyms
- Coptops anancyloides Schwarzer, 1925

Species of beetle

Mutatocoptops anancyloides is a species of beetle in the family Cerambycidae. It was described by Bernhard Schwarzer in 1925, originally under the genus Coptops. It is known from Taiwan and Laos.
