= Xylotrechus incurvatus =

Scientific classification
- Kingdom: Animalia
- Phylum: Arthropoda
- Clade: Pancrustacea
- Class: Insecta
- Order: Coleoptera
- Suborder: Polyphaga
- Infraorder: Cucujiformia
- Family: Cerambycidae
- Genus: Xylotrechus
- Species: X. incurvatus

Binomial name
- Xylotrechus incurvatus (Chevrolat, 1863)

Synonyms
- Amauraesthes incurvatus Chevrolat, 1863

Species of beetle

Xylotrechus incurvatus is a species of beetle in the family Cerambycidae. It was first described in 1863 by Louis Alexandre Auguste Chevrolat as Amauraesthes incurvatus.

It is found in China, Bangladesh, Bhutan, India, Myanmar, Nepal, Taiwan, and South Korea.

Among the recorded host plants are: Juglans regia and other Juglans species; Prunus nepalensis, Prunus sachalinensis and other Prunus species.

== Subspecies ==
There are two subspecies:

- Xylotrechus incurvatus contortus Gahan, 1906
- Xylotrechus incurvatus incurvatus (Chevrolat,1863)
