= Pterolophia annulata =

Scientific classification
- Kingdom: Animalia
- Phylum: Arthropoda
- Clade: Pancrustacea
- Class: Insecta
- Order: Coleoptera
- Suborder: Polyphaga
- Infraorder: Cucujiformia
- Family: Cerambycidae
- Genus: Pterolophia
- Species: P. annulata

Binomial name
- Pterolophia annulata (Chevrolat, 1845)

Synonyms
- Praonetha bowringi Pascoe, 1865; Coptops annulata Chevrolat, 1845; Pterolophia bowringi (Pascoe) Aurivillius, 1922; Pterolophia annulicornis Pic, 1925; Pterolophia scutellata Schwarzer, 1925; Pterolophia lacosus Pic, 1926

Species of beetle

Pterolophia annulata is a species of beetle in the family Cerambycidae. It was described by Chevrolat in 1845, originally under the genus Coptops. It is known from Myanmar, China, Burma, Japan, Korea and Taiwan. It feeds on Piper nigrum.
