= Coptops robustipes =

Scientific classification
- Kingdom: Animalia
- Phylum: Arthropoda
- Class: Insecta
- Order: Coleoptera
- Suborder: Polyphaga
- Infraorder: Cucujiformia
- Family: Cerambycidae
- Genus: Coptops
- Species: C. robustipes

Binomial name
- Coptops robustipes (Pic, 1925)

Synonyms
- Mutatocoptops robustipes Pic, 1925

Species of beetle

Coptops robustipes is a species of beetle in the family Cerambycidae. It was described by Maurice Pic in 1925, originally under the genus Mutatocoptops.
