= Mutatocoptops diversa =

Scientific classification
- Kingdom: Animalia
- Phylum: Arthropoda
- Class: Insecta
- Order: Coleoptera
- Suborder: Polyphaga
- Infraorder: Cucujiformia
- Family: Cerambycidae
- Genus: Mutatocoptops
- Species: M. diversa

Binomial name
- Mutatocoptops diversa (Pascoe, 1865)

Synonyms
- Saimia diversa Pascoe, 1865

Species of beetle

Mutatocoptops diversa is a species of beetle in the family Cerambycidae. It was described by Francis Polkinghorne Pascoe in 1865. It is found in Borneo.
