= Xylotrechus schaefferi =

Scientific classification
- Kingdom: Animalia
- Phylum: Arthropoda
- Class: Insecta
- Order: Coleoptera
- Suborder: Polyphaga
- Infraorder: Cucujiformia
- Family: Cerambycidae
- Genus: Xylotrechus
- Species: X. schaefferi

Binomial name
- Xylotrechus schaefferi Schott, 1925

Species of beetle

Xylotrechus schaefferi is a species of beetle in the family Cerambycidae. It was described by Schott in 1925.
