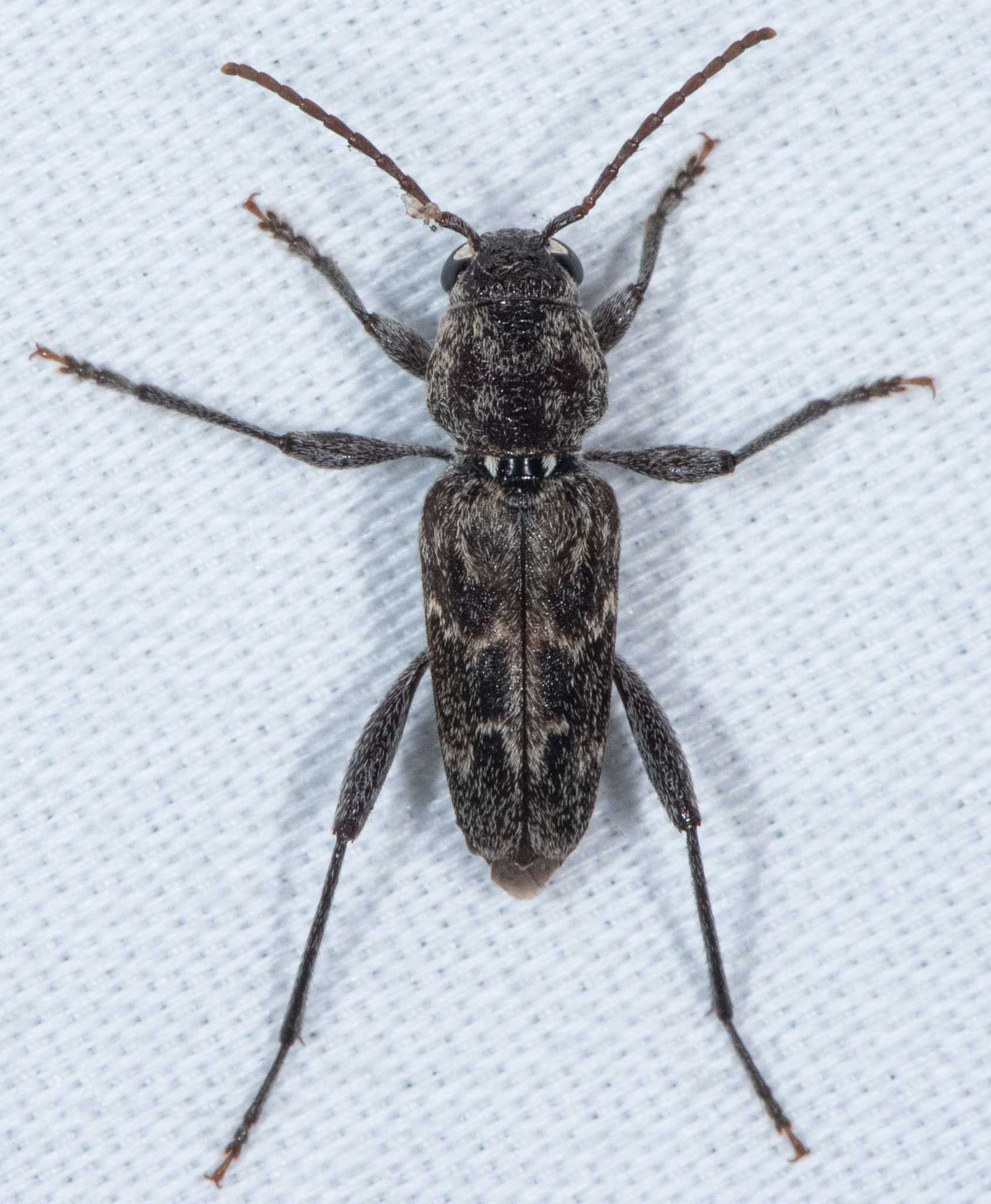

Scientific classification
- Kingdom: Animalia
- Phylum: Arthropoda
- Class: Insecta
- Order: Coleoptera
- Suborder: Polyphaga
- Infraorder: Cucujiformia
- Family: Cerambycidae
- Genus: Xylotrechus
- Species: X. nauticus

Binomial name
- Xylotrechus nauticus (Mannerheim, 1843)

= Xylotrechus nauticus =

Species of beetle

Xylotrechus nauticus is a species of beetle in the family Cerambycidae. It was described by Mannerheim in 1843.
