= Coptops mourgliai =

Scientific classification
- Kingdom: Animalia
- Phylum: Arthropoda
- Class: Insecta
- Order: Coleoptera
- Suborder: Polyphaga
- Infraorder: Cucujiformia
- Family: Cerambycidae
- Genus: Coptops
- Species: C. mourgliai

Binomial name
- Coptops mourgliai Villiers, 1974

Species of beetle

Coptops mourgliai is a species of beetle in the family Cerambycidae. It was described by Villiers in 1974. It is known from Comoros.
