= Coptops similis =

Scientific classification
- Kingdom: Animalia
- Phylum: Arthropoda
- Class: Insecta
- Order: Coleoptera
- Suborder: Polyphaga
- Infraorder: Cucujiformia
- Family: Cerambycidae
- Genus: Coptops
- Species: C. similis

Binomial name
- Coptops similis Breuning, 1935

Species of beetle

Coptops similis is a species of beetle in the family Cerambycidae. It was described by Stephan von Breuning in 1935.
