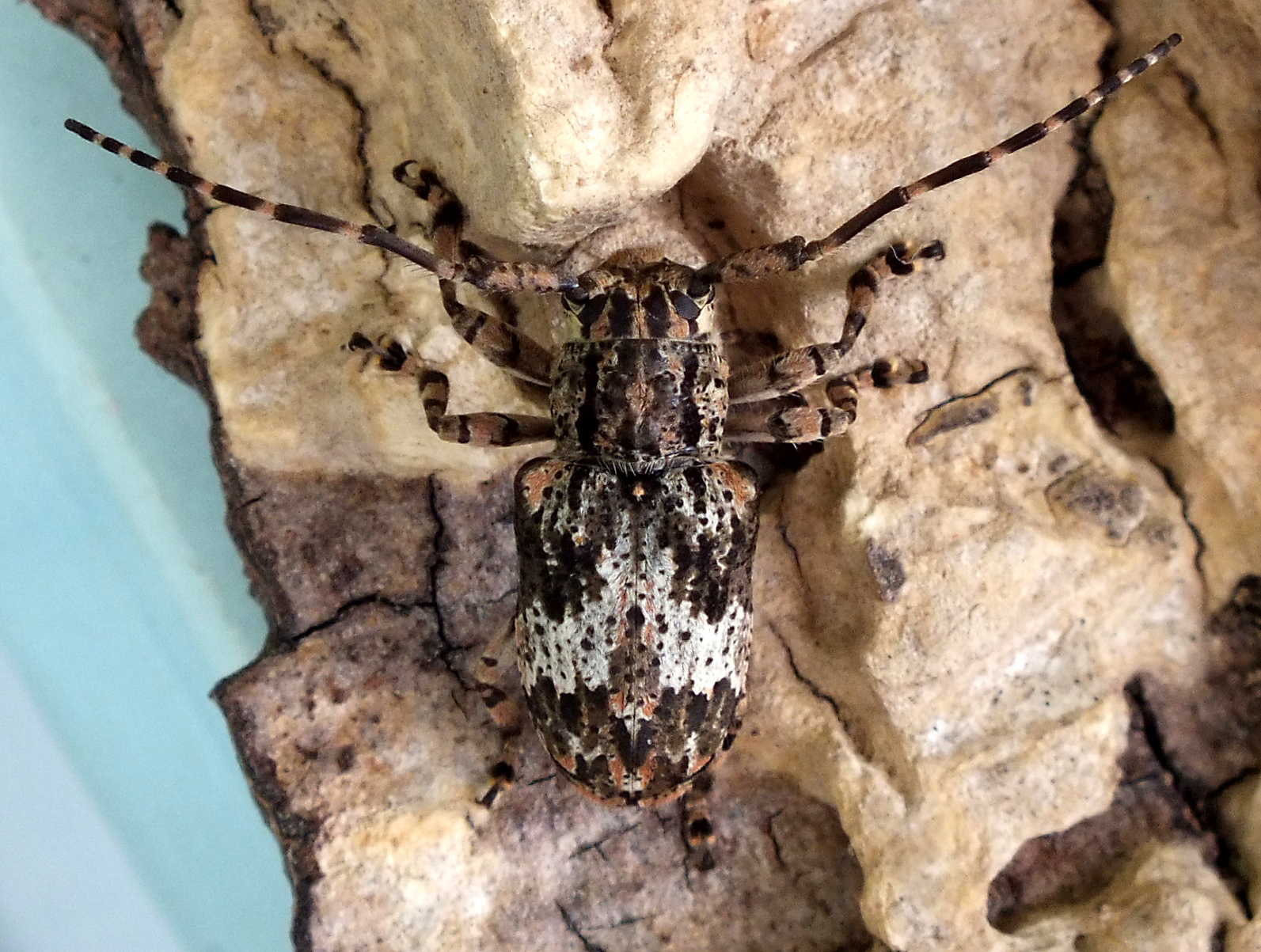

Scientific classification
- Domain: Eukaryota
- Kingdom: Animalia
- Phylum: Arthropoda
- Class: Insecta
- Order: Coleoptera
- Suborder: Polyphaga
- Infraorder: Cucujiformia
- Family: Cerambycidae
- Genus: Coptops
- Species: C. annulipes

Binomial name
- Coptops annulipes Gahan, 1864

= Coptops annulipes =

Species of beetle

Coptops annulipes is a species of beetle in the family Cerambycidae. It was described by Charles Joseph Gahan in 1864. It is known from Malaysia, Cambodia, Indonesia, China, Laos, Myanmar, Thailand, India, and Vietnam.

== Subspecies ==
- Coptops annulipes alorensis Breuning, 1967
- Coptops annulipes annulipes Gahan, 1894
- Coptops annulipes kangeana Breuning, 1968
