= Mutatocoptops celebensis =

Scientific classification
- Kingdom: Animalia
- Phylum: Arthropoda
- Clade: Pancrustacea
- Class: Insecta
- Order: Coleoptera
- Suborder: Polyphaga
- Infraorder: Cucujiformia
- Family: Cerambycidae
- Genus: Mutatocoptops
- Species: M. celebensis

Binomial name
- Mutatocoptops celebensis Breuning, 1964

Species of beetle

Mutatocoptops celebensis is a species of beetle in the family Cerambycidae. It was described by Stephan von Breuning in 1964. It is known from Sulawesi.
