= Coptops thibetana =

Scientific classification
- Kingdom: Animalia
- Phylum: Arthropoda
- Class: Insecta
- Order: Coleoptera
- Suborder: Polyphaga
- Infraorder: Cucujiformia
- Family: Cerambycidae
- Genus: Coptops
- Species: C. thibetana

Binomial name
- Coptops thibetana Breuning, 1974

Synonyms
- Coptops thibetanus Breuning, 1974

Species of beetle

Coptops thibetana is a species of beetle in the family Cerambycidae. It was described by Stephan von Breuning in 1974, originally as C. thibetanus.
