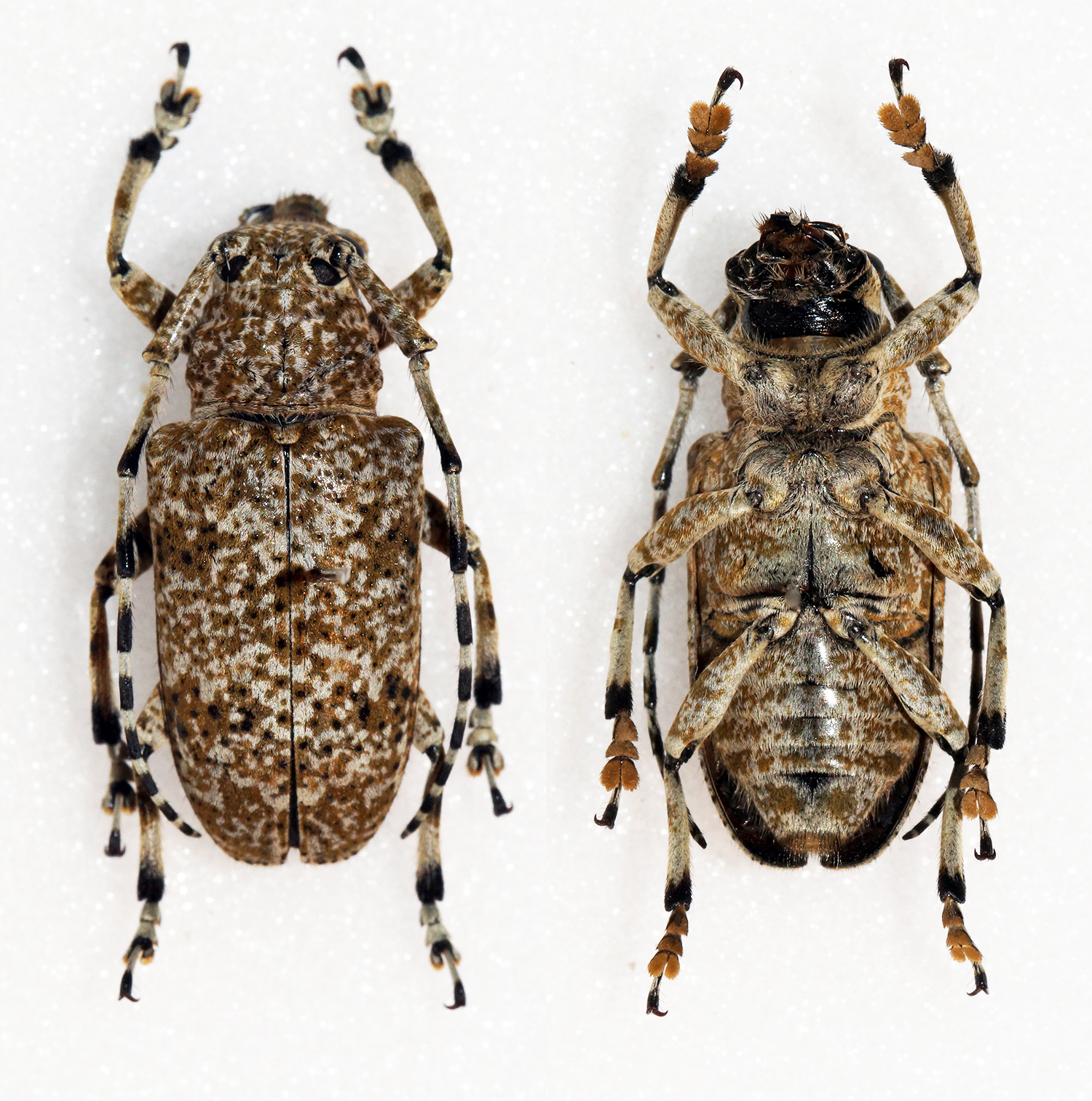

Scientific classification
- Domain: Eukaryota
- Kingdom: Animalia
- Phylum: Arthropoda
- Class: Insecta
- Order: Coleoptera
- Suborder: Polyphaga
- Infraorder: Cucujiformia
- Family: Cerambycidae
- Genus: Coptops
- Species: C. leucostictica

Binomial name
- Coptops leucostictica White, 1858

Synonyms
- Coptops centurio Pascoe, 1869; Coptops lacertosa Pascoe, 1866; Coptops niveisparsa Fairmaire, 1904; Coptops olivacea Breuning, 1935; Mutatocoptops vitalisi Pic, 1926

= Coptops leucostictica =

Species of beetle

Coptops leucostictica is a species of beetle in the family Cerambycidae. It was described by White in 1858. It is known from India, Cambodia, Thailand, Laos, China, Myanmar, Malaysia, and Vietnam. It feeds on Albizia julibrissin.

== Subspecies ==
- Coptops leucostictica leucostictica White, 1858
- Coptops leucostictica rustica Gressitt, 1940
