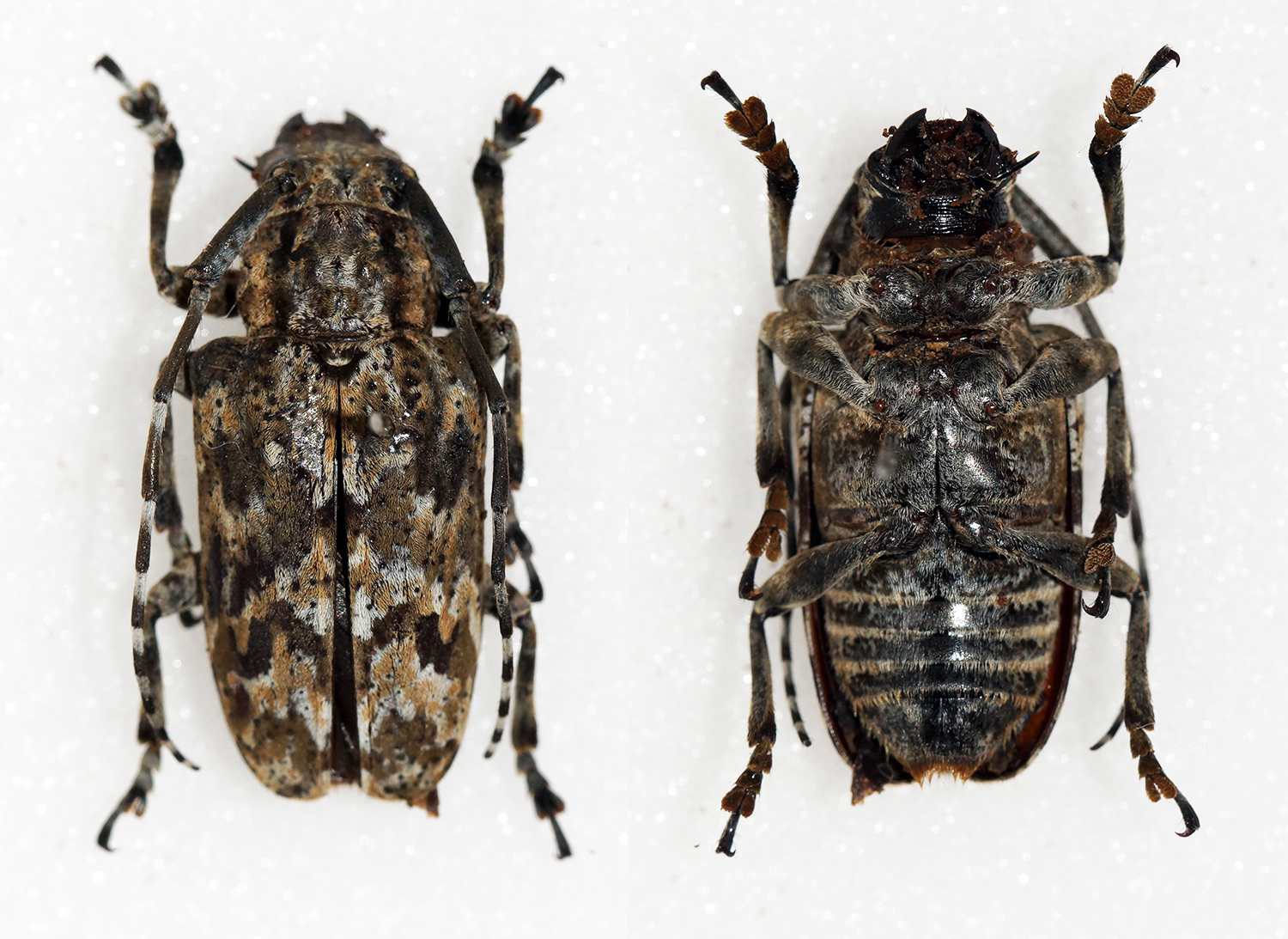

Scientific classification
- Domain: Eukaryota
- Kingdom: Animalia
- Phylum: Arthropoda
- Class: Insecta
- Order: Coleoptera
- Suborder: Polyphaga
- Infraorder: Cucujiformia
- Family: Cerambycidae
- Genus: Coptops
- Species: C. liturata

Binomial name
- Coptops liturata (Klug, 1833)

Synonyms
- Lamia liturata Klug, 1833

= Coptops liturata =

Species of beetle

Coptops liturata is a species of beetle in the family Cerambycidae. It was described by Johann Christoph Friedrich Klug in 1833, originally under the genus Lamia. It is known from Madagascar.
