= Mutatocoptops malaisiana =

Scientific classification
- Kingdom: Animalia
- Phylum: Arthropoda
- Class: Insecta
- Order: Coleoptera
- Suborder: Polyphaga
- Infraorder: Cucujiformia
- Family: Cerambycidae
- Genus: Mutatocoptops
- Species: M. malaisiana

Binomial name
- Mutatocoptops malaisiana Breuning, 1973

Synonyms
- Mutatocoptops alboapicalis Pic, 1925

Species of beetle

Mutatocoptops malaisiana is a species of beetle in the family Cerambycidae. It was described by Stephan von Breuning in 1973. It is known from Malaysia.
