= Coptops albonotata =

Scientific classification
- Kingdom: Animalia
- Phylum: Arthropoda
- Class: Insecta
- Order: Coleoptera
- Suborder: Polyphaga
- Infraorder: Cucujiformia
- Family: Cerambycidae
- Genus: Coptops
- Species: C. albonotata

Binomial name
- Coptops albonotata (Pic, 1917)

Synonyms
- Mutatocoptops albosparsa Pic, 1926; Pachyosa albonotata Pic, 1917

Species of beetle

Coptops albonotata is a species of beetle in the family Cerambycidae. It was described by Maurice Pic in 1917. It is known from China.
