= Coptops rufa =

Scientific classification
- Kingdom: Animalia
- Phylum: Arthropoda
- Class: Insecta
- Order: Coleoptera
- Suborder: Polyphaga
- Infraorder: Cucujiformia
- Family: Cerambycidae
- Genus: Coptops
- Species: C. rufa

Binomial name
- Coptops rufa Thomson, 1878

Species of beetle

Coptops rufa is a species of beetle in the family Cerambycidae. It was described by James Thomson in 1878. It is known from the Andaman and Nicobar Islands.
