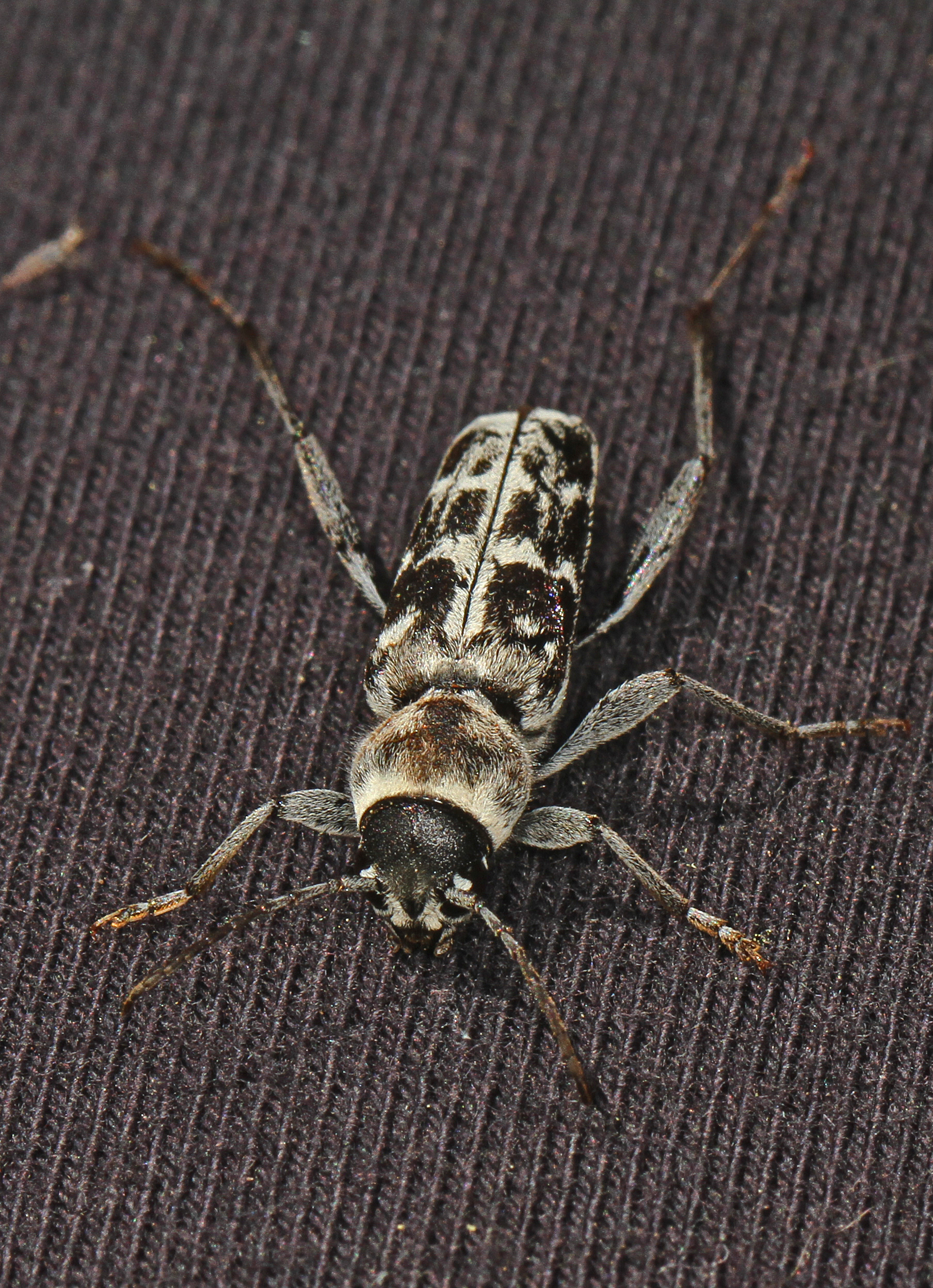

Scientific classification
- Kingdom: Animalia
- Phylum: Arthropoda
- Class: Insecta
- Order: Coleoptera
- Suborder: Polyphaga
- Infraorder: Cucujiformia
- Family: Cerambycidae
- Genus: Xylotrechus
- Species: X. albonotatus

Binomial name
- Xylotrechus albonotatus Casey, 1912

= Xylotrechus albonotatus =

Species of beetle

Xylotrechus albonotatus is a species of beetle in the family Cerambycidae. It was described by Thomas Lincoln Casey Jr. in 1912.
