= Coptops marmorea =

Scientific classification
- Kingdom: Animalia
- Phylum: Arthropoda
- Class: Insecta
- Order: Coleoptera
- Suborder: Polyphaga
- Infraorder: Cucujiformia
- Family: Cerambycidae
- Genus: Coptops
- Species: C. marmorea

Binomial name
- Coptops marmorea Breuning, 1939

Species of beetle

Coptops marmorea is a species of beetle in the family Cerambycidae. It was described by Stephan von Breuning in 1939. It is known from Philippines.
