= Xylotrechus quercus =

Scientific classification
- Kingdom: Animalia
- Phylum: Arthropoda
- Class: Insecta
- Order: Coleoptera
- Suborder: Polyphaga
- Infraorder: Cucujiformia
- Family: Cerambycidae
- Genus: Xylotrechus
- Species: X. quercus

Binomial name
- Xylotrechus quercus Schaeffer, 1905

Species of beetle

Xylotrechus quercus is a species of beetle in the family Cerambycidae. It was described by Schaeffer in 1905.
