= Xylotrechus ibex =

Scientific classification
- Kingdom: Animalia
- Phylum: Arthropoda
- Class: Insecta
- Order: Coleoptera
- Suborder: Polyphaga
- Infraorder: Cucujiformia
- Family: Cerambycidae
- Genus: Xylotrechus
- Species: X. ibex

Binomial name
- Xylotrechus ibex (Gebler, 1825)

Synonyms
- Clytus ibex Gebler, 1825; Clytus fugitivus Thieme, 1881; Clytus rectangulus Motschulsky, 1875; Clytus angulosus Motschulsky, 1875; Clytus fugitivus Thieme, 1881; Clytus rectangulus Motschulsky, 1875

Species of beetle

Xylotrechus ibex is a species of beetle in the family Cerambycidae. It was first described in 1825 by Friedrich August von Gebler as Clytus ibex.

It is found in China, Korea, Japan, and Russia. In Europe it is found in Germany, Poland, Finland and Belarus.

It has a life cycle of one to two years, with adults appearing from June to August

Recorded host plant families are: Betulaceae (Alnus hirsute;, A. japonica, Betula ermani, B. grossa, B. maximowicziana, Betula platyphylla var. japonica, and Salicaceae (various Populus species). Another listed host is Alnus glutinosa.

IUCN lists this species as "near threatened", because its area of occupancy is unlikely to be much more than 2,000 km² and it has a severely fragmented distribution. Its habitat is very old broad-leaved trees. Such trees are declining. Hence it is thought that the population is decreasing. It is threatened additionally by the creation of transport corridors and by logging.
