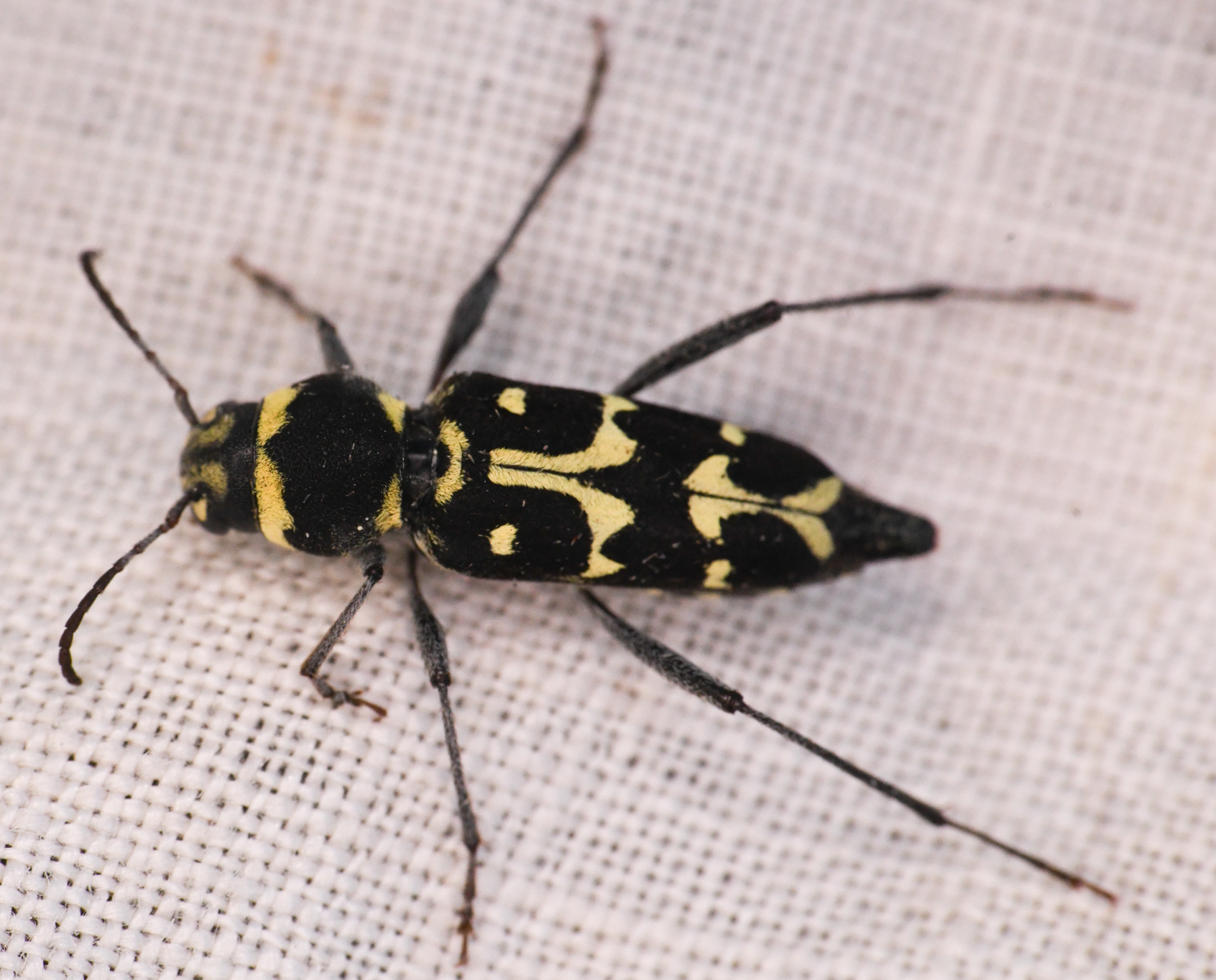

Scientific classification
- Kingdom: Animalia
- Phylum: Arthropoda
- Clade: Pancrustacea
- Class: Insecta
- Order: Coleoptera
- Suborder: Polyphaga
- Infraorder: Cucujiformia
- Family: Cerambycidae
- Genus: Xylotrechus
- Species: X. undulatus

Binomial name
- Xylotrechus undulatus (Say, 1824)

= Xylotrechus undulatus =

Species of beetle

Xylotrechus undulatus is a species of beetle in the family Cerambycidae. It was described by Say in 1824.
