= Xylotrechus aceris =

Scientific classification
- Kingdom: Animalia
- Phylum: Arthropoda
- Class: Insecta
- Order: Coleoptera
- Suborder: Polyphaga
- Infraorder: Cucujiformia
- Family: Cerambycidae
- Genus: Xylotrechus
- Species: X. aceris

Binomial name
- Xylotrechus aceris Fisher, 1917

Species of beetle

Xylotrechus aceris is a species of beetle in the family Cerambycidae. It was described by Fisher in 1917.
