= Mutatocoptops alboapicalis =

Scientific classification
- Kingdom: Animalia
- Phylum: Arthropoda
- Class: Insecta
- Order: Coleoptera
- Suborder: Polyphaga
- Infraorder: Cucujiformia
- Family: Cerambycidae
- Genus: Mutatocoptops
- Species: M. alboapicalis

Binomial name
- Mutatocoptops alboapicalis Pic, 1925

Synonyms
- ?Paracoptops cristata Fisher, 1936

Species of beetle

Mutatocoptops alboapicalis is a species of beetle in the family Cerambycidae. It was described by Maurice Pic in 1925. It is known from India, China, Laos, Thailand, and possibly Java and Malaysia.
