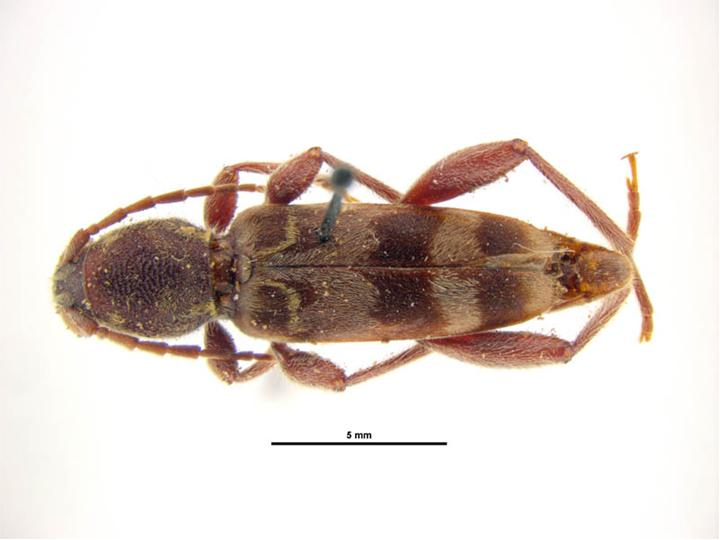

Scientific classification
- Kingdom: Animalia
- Phylum: Arthropoda
- Class: Insecta
- Order: Coleoptera
- Suborder: Polyphaga
- Infraorder: Cucujiformia
- Family: Cerambycidae
- Genus: Xylotrechus
- Species: X. colonus

Binomial name
- Xylotrechus colonus (Fabricius, 1775)

= Xylotrechus colonus =

Species of beetle

Xylotrechus colonus is a species of beetle in the family Cerambycidae, subfamily Cerambycinae, and tribe Clytini. Its common name is rustic borer or rustic borer beetle. It was described by Johan Christian Fabricius in 1775. The larvae of this beetle feed on the sapwood of oaks (Quercus), whereas adults feed on the nectar of goldenrod (Solidago) and other composite flowers. The wing covers are black, with variable bands of grey, and a sinuous yellow mark near the base. The underside of the beetle is black, with faint yellow banding.

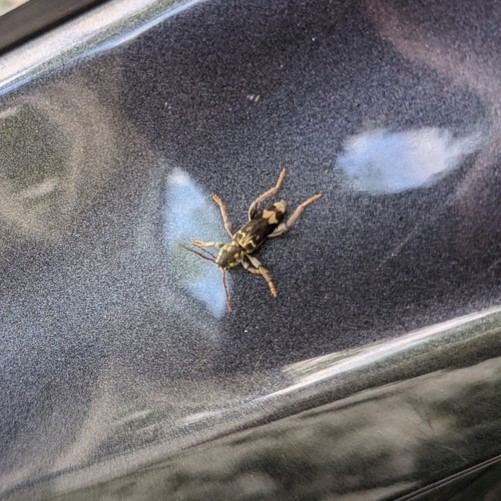

== Range ==
Xylotrechus colonus is most commonly found in the eastern half of the United States, starting roughly at the center of Texas and above.
