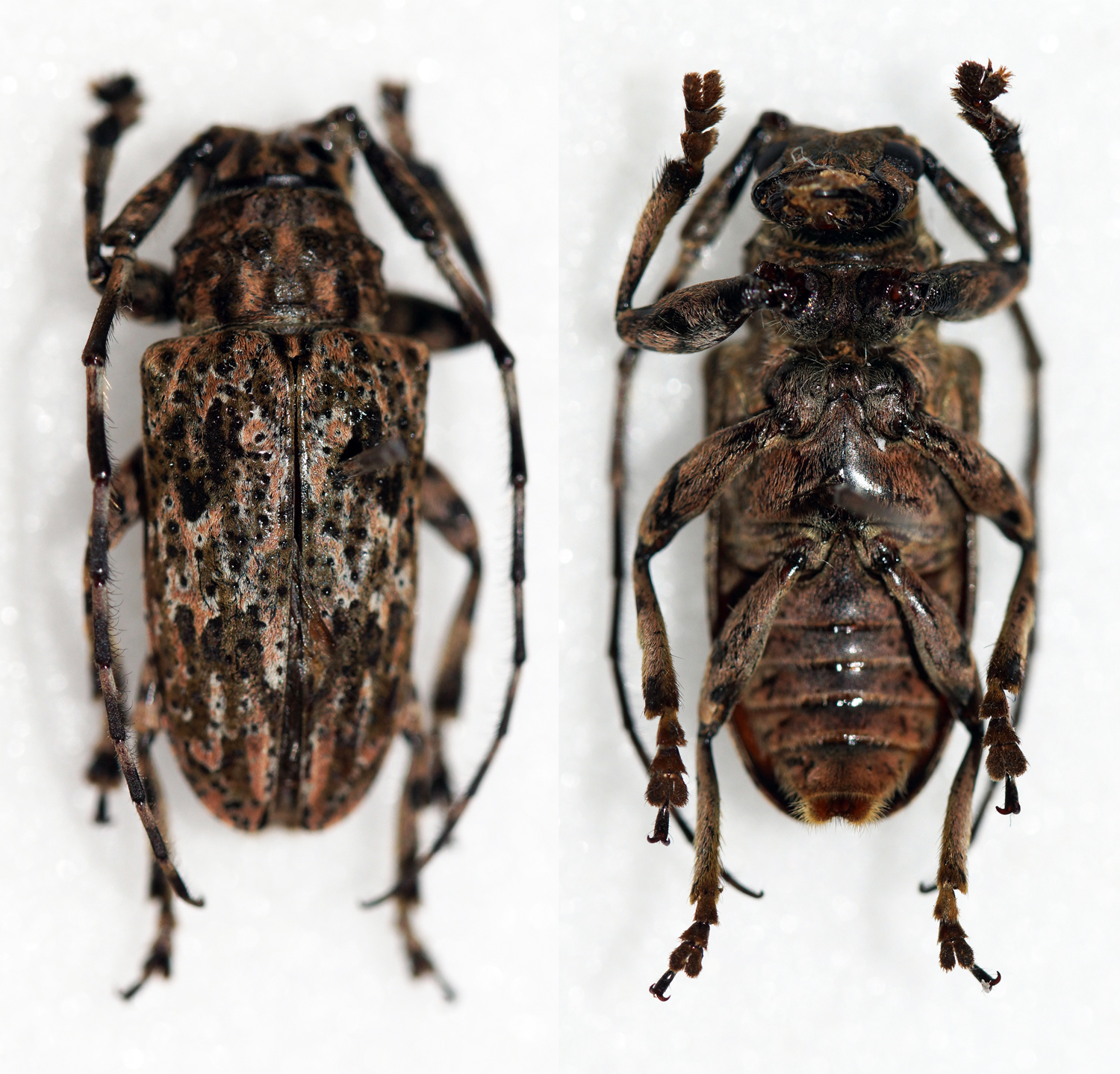

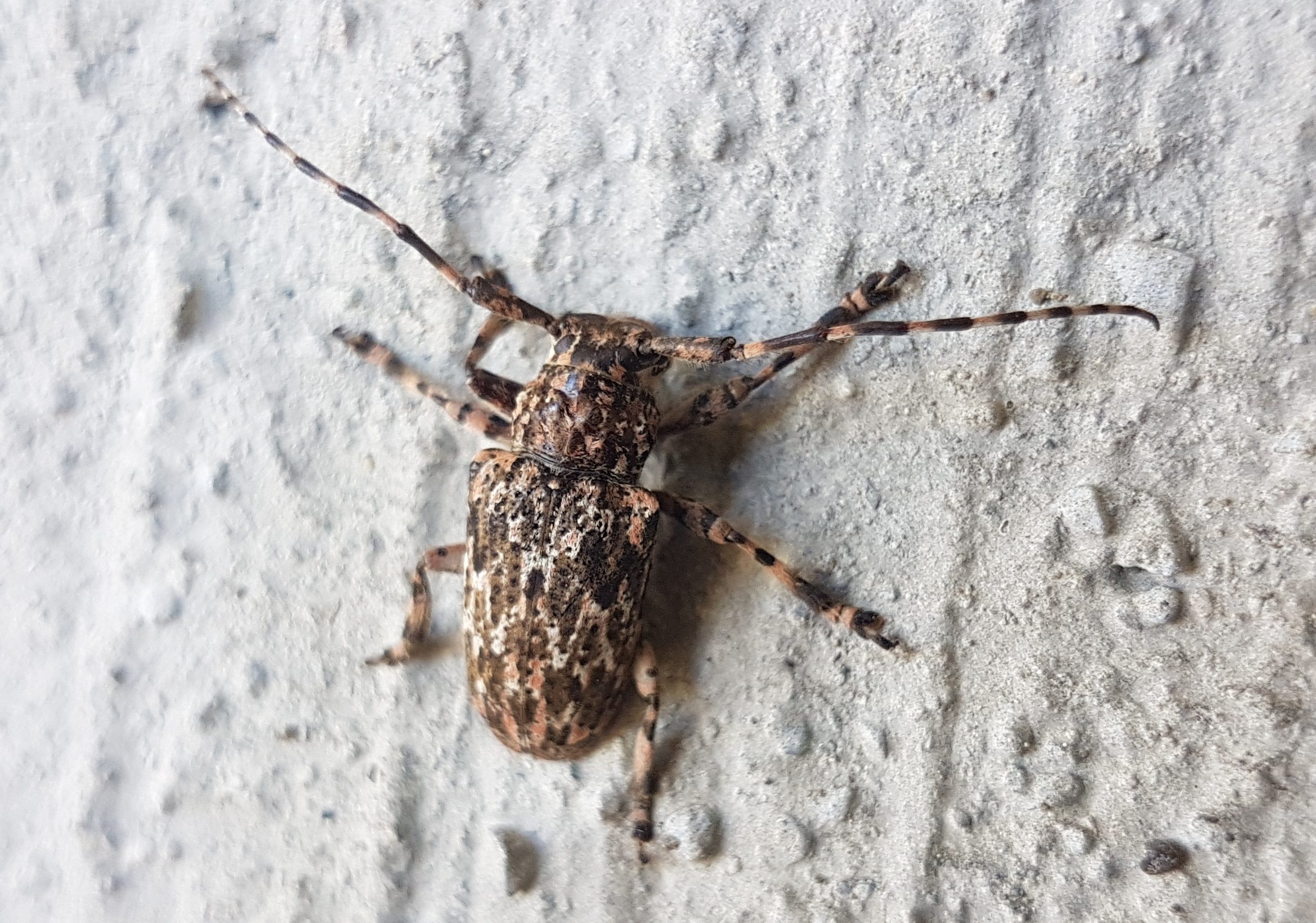
- Coptops tetrica from Bukidnon, Philippines

Scientific classification
- Domain: Eukaryota
- Kingdom: Animalia
- Phylum: Arthropoda
- Class: Insecta
- Order: Coleoptera
- Suborder: Polyphaga
- Infraorder: Cucujiformia
- Family: Cerambycidae
- Genus: Coptops
- Species: C. tetrica

Binomial name
- Coptops tetrica (Newman, 1842)

Synonyms
- Agelasta tetrica Newman, 1842; ?Coptops mindanaonis Breuning, 1980

= Coptops tetrica =

Species of beetle

Coptops tetrica is a species of beetle in the family Cerambycidae. It was described by Newman in 1842, originally under the genus Agelasta. It is known from the Philippines.
