= Xylotrechus arvicola lazarevi =

Scientific classification
- Kingdom: Animalia
- Phylum: Arthropoda
- Class: Insecta
- Order: Coleoptera
- Suborder: Polyphaga
- Infraorder: Cucujiformia
- Family: Cerambycidae
- Genus: Xylotrechus
- Species: X. arvicola
- Subspecies: X. a. lazarevi

Trinomial name
- Xylotrechus arvicola lazarevi Danilevsky, 2016

Subspecies of beetle

Xylotrechus arvicola lazarevi is a subspecies of beetle in the family Cerambycidae. It was described by Danilevsky in 2016. It is known from Russia, Krasnodar Region, Ubinskoe (about 150 m, ).

== Etymology ==
The new taxon was dedicated to Maxim Lazarev, an entomologist from Moscow.
