= Xylotrechus nunenmacheri =

Scientific classification
- Kingdom: Animalia
- Phylum: Arthropoda
- Class: Insecta
- Order: Coleoptera
- Suborder: Polyphaga
- Infraorder: Cucujiformia
- Family: Cerambycidae
- Genus: Xylotrechus
- Species: X. nunenmacheri

Binomial name
- Xylotrechus nunenmacheri Van Dyke, 1920

Species of beetle

Xylotrechus nunenmacheri is a species of beetle in the family Cerambycidae. It was described by Van Dyke in 1920.
