= Coptops andamanica =

Scientific classification
- Kingdom: Animalia
- Phylum: Arthropoda
- Class: Insecta
- Order: Coleoptera
- Suborder: Polyphaga
- Infraorder: Cucujiformia
- Family: Cerambycidae
- Genus: Coptops
- Species: C. andamanica

Binomial name
- Coptops andamanica Breuning, 1935

Species of beetle

Coptops andamanica is a species of beetle in the family Cerambycidae. It was described by Stephan von Breuning in 1935.
