= Mutatocoptops annulicornis =

Scientific classification
- Kingdom: Animalia
- Phylum: Arthropoda
- Class: Insecta
- Order: Coleoptera
- Suborder: Polyphaga
- Infraorder: Cucujiformia
- Family: Cerambycidae
- Genus: Mutatocoptops
- Species: M. annulicornis

Binomial name
- Mutatocoptops annulicornis (Heller, 1926)

Synonyms
- Mutatocoptops lumawigi Breuning, 1980; Saimia annulicornis Heller, 1926

Species of beetle

Mutatocoptops annulicornis is a species of beetle in the family Cerambycidae. It was described by Heller in 1926, originally under the genus Saimia. It is known from the Philippines.
