= Coptops undulata =

Scientific classification
- Kingdom: Animalia
- Phylum: Arthropoda
- Clade: Pancrustacea
- Class: Insecta
- Order: Coleoptera
- Suborder: Polyphaga
- Infraorder: Cucujiformia
- Family: Cerambycidae
- Genus: Coptops
- Species: C. undulata

Binomial name
- Coptops undulata Pascoe, 1865

Species of beetle

Coptops undulata is a species of beetle in the family Cerambycidae. It was described by Francis Polkinghorne Pascoe in 1865. It is known from Malaysia and Java.

== Subspecies ==
- Coptops undulata javanica Breuning, 1967
- Coptops undulata undulata Pascoe, 1865
