= Coptops diversesparsa =

Scientific classification
- Kingdom: Animalia
- Phylum: Arthropoda
- Class: Insecta
- Order: Coleoptera
- Suborder: Polyphaga
- Infraorder: Cucujiformia
- Family: Cerambycidae
- Genus: Coptops
- Species: C. diversesparsa

Binomial name
- Coptops diversesparsa (Pic, 1917)

Synonyms
- Mutatocoptops nigrosparsa (Pic) Pic, 1933; Pachyosa diversesparsa Pic, 1917

Species of beetle

Coptops diversesparsa is a species of beetle in the family Cerambycidae. It was described by Maurice Pic in 1917.
