= Coptops alboirrorata =

Scientific classification
- Kingdom: Animalia
- Phylum: Arthropoda
- Class: Insecta
- Order: Coleoptera
- Suborder: Polyphaga
- Infraorder: Cucujiformia
- Family: Cerambycidae
- Genus: Coptops
- Species: C. alboirrorata

Binomial name
- Coptops alboirrorata E. Fuchs, 1966

Species of beetle

Coptops alboirrorata is a species of beetle in the family Cerambycidae. It was described by Ernst Fuchs in 1966. It is known from Vietnam.
