= Mutatocoptops tonkinea =

Scientific classification
- Kingdom: Animalia
- Phylum: Arthropoda
- Class: Insecta
- Order: Coleoptera
- Suborder: Polyphaga
- Infraorder: Cucujiformia
- Family: Cerambycidae
- Genus: Mutatocoptops
- Species: M. tonkinea

Binomial name
- Mutatocoptops tonkinea Pic, 1925

Species of beetle

Mutatocoptops tonkinea is a species of beetle in the family Cerambycidae. It was described by Maurice Pic in 1925. It is known from Vietnam.
