= Xylotrechus quadrimaculatus =

Scientific classification
- Kingdom: Animalia
- Phylum: Arthropoda
- Class: Insecta
- Order: Coleoptera
- Suborder: Polyphaga
- Infraorder: Cucujiformia
- Family: Cerambycidae
- Genus: Xylotrechus
- Species: X. quadrimaculatus

Binomial name
- Xylotrechus quadrimaculatus (Haldeman, 1847)

Species of beetle

Xylotrechus quadrimaculatus is a species of beetle in the family Cerambycidae. It was described by Haldeman in 1847.
