= Coptops cameroni =

Scientific classification
- Domain: Eukaryota
- Kingdom: Animalia
- Phylum: Arthropoda
- Class: Insecta
- Order: Coleoptera
- Suborder: Polyphaga
- Infraorder: Cucujiformia
- Family: Cerambycidae
- Genus: Coptops
- Species: C. cameroni

Binomial name
- Coptops cameroni Breuning, 1978

Species of beetle

Coptops cameroni is a species of beetle in the family Cerambycidae. It was described by Stephan von Breuning in 1978.
