= Prunus bracteopadus =

Scientific classification
- Kingdom: Plantae
- Clade: Tracheophytes
- Clade: Angiosperms
- Clade: Eudicots
- Clade: Rosids
- Order: Rosales
- Family: Rosaceae
- Genus: Prunus
- Species: P. bracteopadus

Binomial name
- Prunus bracteopadus Koehne

Synonyms
- Prunus nepalensis Hook.f. (Note: Note that the spelling of and authority for Prunus nepalensis Hook.f. differ from Prunus napaulensis (Ser.) Steud.)

Species of tree

Prunus bracteopadus is a putative species of bird cherry native to the eastern foothills of the Himalayas, Assam and Uttarakhand. It is very closely related to, and perhaps conspecific with, Prunus napaulensis.
