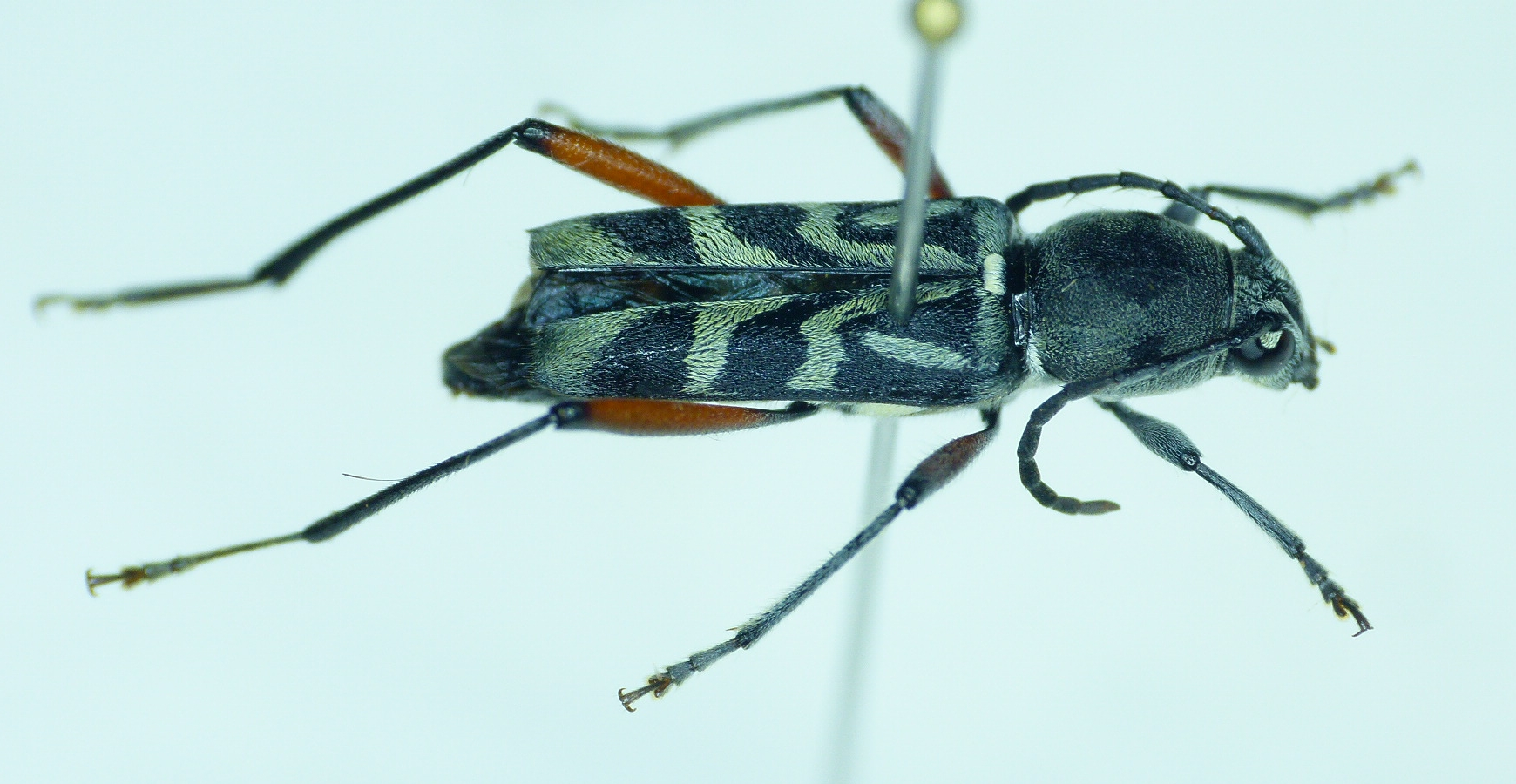
- Xylotrechus quadripes

Scientific classification
- Kingdom: Animalia
- Phylum: Arthropoda
- Clade: Pancrustacea
- Class: Insecta
- Order: Coleoptera
- Suborder: Polyphaga
- Infraorder: Cucujiformia
- Family: Cerambycidae
- Subfamily: Cerambycinae
- Tribe: Clytini
- Genus: Xylotrechus; Chevrolat, 1860

Subgenera
- Rusticoclytus Vives, 1977; Xylotrechus Chevrolat, 1860

= Xylotrechus =

Genus of beetles

Xylotrechus a genus of longhorned beetles of the family Cerambycidae, containing some 200 described species.

== Selected species ==
Some of the species in the genus include:

- Xylotrechus aceris Fisher, 1917
- Xylotrechus aedon Jordan, 1903
- Xylotrechus albonotatus Casey, 1912
- Xylotrechus annobonae Aurivillius, 1910
- Xylotrechus annosus (Say, 1826)
- Xylotrechus arvicola (Olivier, 1800)
  - Xylotrechus arvicola iranicus Rapuzzi & Sama, 2014
  - Xylotrechus arvicola lazarevi Danilevsky, 2016
  - Xylotrechus arvicola planarius Danilevsky, 2016
- Xylotrechus bowditchi Hopping, 1928
- Xylotrechus colonus (Fabricius, 1775)
- Xylotrechus convergens LeConte, 1873
- Xylotrechus durangoensis Chemsak & Linsley, 1974
- Xylotrechus gemellus Casey, 1893 (Presumed extinct)
- Xylotrechus hovorei Swift, 2007
- Xylotrechus ibex (Gebler, 1825)
- Xylotrechus incurvatus (Chevrolat, 1863)
- Xylotrechus insignis LeConte, 1873
- Xylotrechus integer (Haldeman, 1847)
- Xylotrechus lengi Schaeffer, 1908
- Xylotrechus longitarsis Casey, 1912
- Xylotrechus mormonus (LeConte, 1861)
- Xylotrechus nauticus (Mannerheim, 1843)
- Xylotrechus nitidus (Horn, 1860)
- Xylotrechus nunenmacheri Van Dyke, 1920
- Xylotrechus obliteratus LeConte, 1873
- Xylotrechus pyrrhoderus Bates, 1873
- Xylotrechus quadrimaculatus (Haldeman, 1847)
- Xylotrechus quadripes Chevrolat, 1863
- Xylotrechus quercus Schaeffer, 1905
- Xylotrechus robustus Hopping, 1941
- Xylotrechus rusticus (Linnaeus, 1758)
- Xylotrechus sagittatus (Germar, 1821)
- Xylotrechus sartorii (Chevrolat, 1860)
- Xylotrechus schaefferi Schott, 1925
- Xylotrechus undulatus (Say, 1824)
