= Xylotrechus robustus =

Scientific classification
- Kingdom: Animalia
- Phylum: Arthropoda
- Clade: Pancrustacea
- Class: Insecta
- Order: Coleoptera
- Suborder: Polyphaga
- Infraorder: Cucujiformia
- Family: Cerambycidae
- Genus: Xylotrechus
- Species: X. robustus

Binomial name
- Xylotrechus robustus Hopping, 1941

Species of beetle

Xylotrechus robustus is a species of beetle in the family Cerambycidae. It was described by Hopping in 1941.
