= Coptops pascoei =

Scientific classification
- Kingdom: Animalia
- Phylum: Arthropoda
- Class: Insecta
- Order: Coleoptera
- Suborder: Polyphaga
- Infraorder: Cucujiformia
- Family: Cerambycidae
- Genus: Coptops
- Species: C. pascoei

Binomial name
- Coptops pascoei Gahan, 1894

Species of beetle

Coptops pascoei is a species of beetle in the family Cerambycidae. It was described by Charles Joseph Gahan in 1894.
