= Insulochamus thomensis =

Scientific classification
- Kingdom: Animalia
- Phylum: Arthropoda
- Class: Insecta
- Order: Coleoptera
- Suborder: Polyphaga
- Infraorder: Cucujiformia
- Family: Cerambycidae
- Genus: Insulochamus
- Species: I. thomensis

Binomial name
- Insulochamus thomensis (Jordan, 1903)

Synonyms
- Monochamus thomensis (Jordan, 1903)

Species of beetle

Insulochamus thomensis is a species of beetle in the family Cerambycidae. It was described by Karl Jordan in 1903 as Monochamus thomensis. It is known from São Tomé and Príncipe.
