= Coptops semiscalaris =

Scientific classification
- Kingdom: Animalia
- Phylum: Arthropoda
- Class: Insecta
- Order: Coleoptera
- Suborder: Polyphaga
- Infraorder: Cucujiformia
- Family: Cerambycidae
- Genus: Coptops
- Species: C. semiscalaris

Binomial name
- Coptops semiscalaris (Pic, 1928)

Species of beetle

Coptops semiscalaris is a species of beetle in the family Cerambycidae. It was described by Maurice Pic in 1928.
