= Xylotrechus aedon =

Scientific classification
- Kingdom: Animalia
- Phylum: Arthropoda
- Class: Insecta
- Order: Coleoptera
- Suborder: Polyphaga
- Infraorder: Cucujiformia
- Family: Cerambycidae
- Genus: Xylotrechus
- Species: X. aedon

Binomial name
- Xylotrechus aedon Jordan, 1903

Species of beetle

Xylotrechis aedon is a species of longhorn beetles of the family Cerambycidae. The species was described in 1903 by Karl Jordan. It is endemic to São Tomé and Príncipe, where it occurs on the island of São Tomé.

Its length is 11 millimetres (0.43 in).
