= Xylotrechus hovorei =

Scientific classification
- Kingdom: Animalia
- Phylum: Arthropoda
- Class: Insecta
- Order: Coleoptera
- Suborder: Polyphaga
- Infraorder: Cucujiformia
- Family: Cerambycidae
- Genus: Xylotrechus
- Species: X. hovorei

Binomial name
- Xylotrechus hovorei Swift, 2007

Species of beetle

Xylotrechus hovorei is a species of beetle in the family Cerambycidae. It was described by Swift in 2007.
