= Coptops humerosa =

Scientific classification
- Kingdom: Animalia
- Phylum: Arthropoda
- Class: Insecta
- Order: Coleoptera
- Suborder: Polyphaga
- Infraorder: Cucujiformia
- Family: Cerambycidae
- Genus: Coptops
- Species: C. humerosa

Binomial name
- Coptops humerosa Fairmaire, 1871

Synonyms
- Coptops humerosus Fairmaire, 1871

Species of beetle

Coptops humerosa is a species of beetle in the family Cerambycidae. It was described by Fairmaire in 1871, originally as C. humerosus. It is known from Seychelles.
