= Coptops lichenea =

Scientific classification
- Domain: Eukaryota
- Kingdom: Animalia
- Phylum: Arthropoda
- Class: Insecta
- Order: Coleoptera
- Suborder: Polyphaga
- Infraorder: Cucujiformia
- Family: Cerambycidae
- Genus: Coptops
- Species: C. lichenea

Binomial name
- Coptops lichenea Pascoe, 1865

Synonyms
- Mutatocoptops salvazai Pic, 1925; Mutatocoptops salwazei Pic, 1925 (misspelling)

Species of beetle

Coptops lichenea is a species of beetle in the family Cerambycidae. It was described by Francis Polkinghorne Pascoe in 1865. It is known from Myanmar, Laos, Malaysia, and Nepal.
