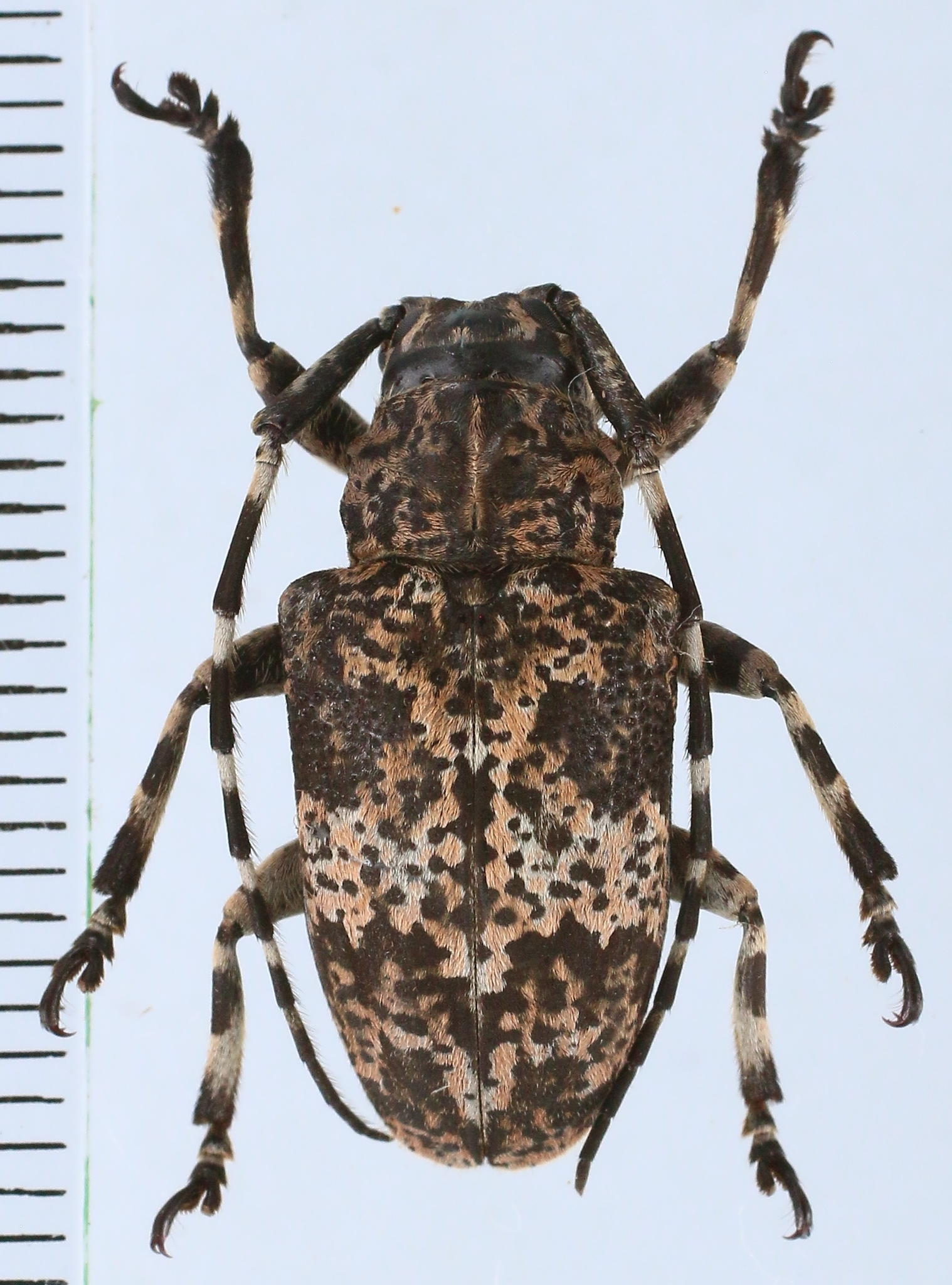

Scientific classification
- Kingdom: Animalia
- Phylum: Arthropoda
- Class: Insecta
- Order: Coleoptera
- Suborder: Polyphaga
- Infraorder: Cucujiformia
- Family: Cerambycidae
- Genus: Coptops
- Species: C. pardalis

Binomial name
- Coptops pardalis (Pascoe, 1862)

Synonyms
- Abryna pardalis Pascoe, 1862

= Coptops pardalis =

Species of beetle

Coptops pardalis is a species of beetle in the family Cerambycidae. It was described by Francis Polkinghorne Pascoe in 1862, originally under the genus Abryna. It is known from Moluccas.
