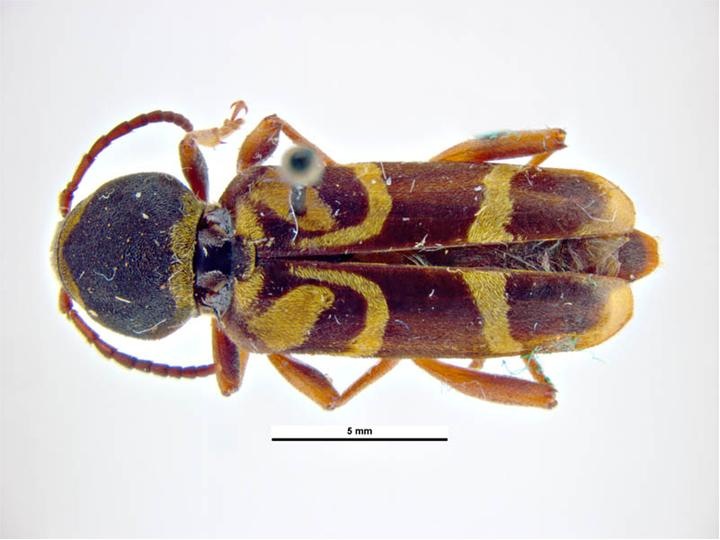

Scientific classification
- Kingdom: Animalia
- Phylum: Arthropoda
- Clade: Pancrustacea
- Class: Insecta
- Order: Coleoptera
- Suborder: Polyphaga
- Infraorder: Cucujiformia
- Family: Cerambycidae
- Genus: Xylotrechus
- Species: X. insignis

Binomial name
- Xylotrechus insignis LeConte, 1873

= Xylotrechus insignis =

Species of beetle

Xylotrechus insignis is a species of beetle in the family Cerambycidae. It was described by John Lawrence LeConte in 1873. Xylotrechus insignis is commonly referred to as a willow borer which means that it drills into trees usually killing or harming the tree. Xylotrechus insignis lives mainly in trees and especially willows; mainly in North America. They reach about 12 to 16 mm in length.
