= Mutatocoptops bituberosa =

Scientific classification
- Kingdom: Animalia
- Phylum: Arthropoda
- Class: Insecta
- Order: Coleoptera
- Suborder: Polyphaga
- Infraorder: Cucujiformia
- Family: Cerambycidae
- Genus: Mutatocoptops
- Species: M. bituberosa

Binomial name
- Mutatocoptops bituberosa (Pascoe, 1866)

Synonyms
- Saimia (Paracoptops) tuberosa Heller, 1926; Saimia bituberosa Pascoe, 1866

Species of beetle

Mutatocoptops bituberosa is a species of beetle in the family Cerambycidae. It was described by Francis Polkinghorne Pascoe in 1866. It is known from Malaysia and Borneo.
