= Xylotrechus annosus =

Scientific classification
- Kingdom: Animalia
- Phylum: Arthropoda
- Class: Insecta
- Order: Coleoptera
- Suborder: Polyphaga
- Infraorder: Cucujiformia
- Family: Cerambycidae
- Genus: Xylotrechus
- Species: X. annosus

Binomial name
- Xylotrechus annosus (Say, 1826)

Species of beetle

Xylotrechus annosus is a species of beetle in the family Cerambycidae. It was described by Say in 1826.
