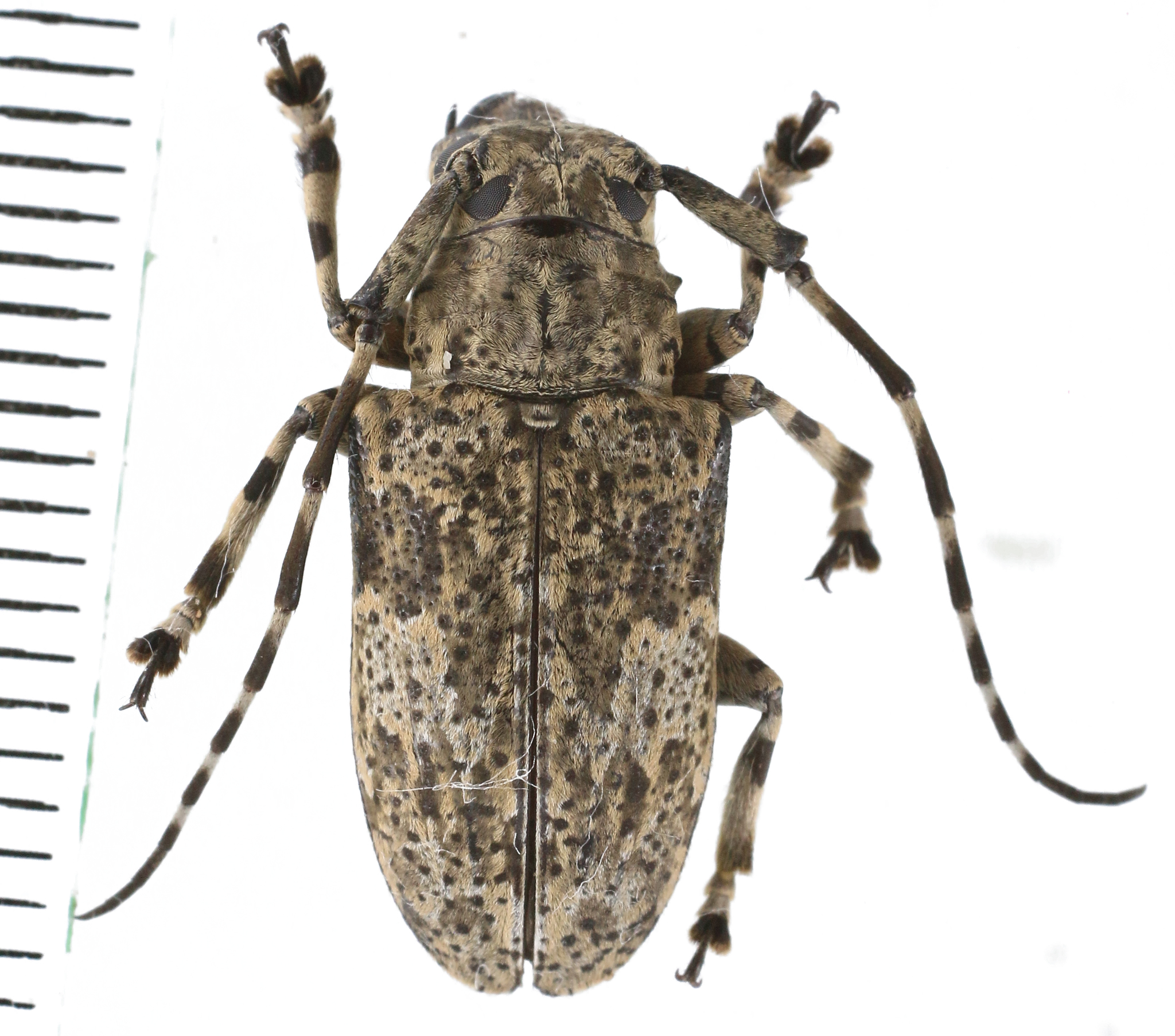

Scientific classification
- Domain: Eukaryota
- Kingdom: Animalia
- Phylum: Arthropoda
- Class: Insecta
- Order: Coleoptera
- Suborder: Polyphaga
- Infraorder: Cucujiformia
- Family: Cerambycidae
- Genus: Coptops
- Species: C. illicita

Binomial name
- Coptops illicita Pascoe, 1865

= Coptops illicita =

Species of beetle

Coptops illicita is a species of beetle in the family Cerambycidae. It was first described by Francis Polkinghorne Pascoe in 1865. It is known from Indonesia and the Philippines.

== Subspecies ==
- Coptops illicita auguralis Pascoe, 1865
- Coptops illicita illicita Pascoe, 1865
- Coptops illicita rosacea Breuning, 1980 inq.
- Coptops illicita tabida Pascoe, 1865
