= Coptops aedificator =

Scientific classification
- Kingdom: Animalia
- Phylum: Arthropoda
- Clade: Pancrustacea
- Class: Insecta
- Order: Coleoptera
- Suborder: Polyphaga
- Infraorder: Cucujiformia
- Family: Cerambycidae
- Genus: Coptops
- Species: C. aedificator

Binomial name
- Coptops aedificator (Fabricius, 1792)

Synonyms
- Cerambyx fuscus Olivier, 1792; Cerambyx villica Olivier, 1792; Coptops calliginosus Dejean, 1837; Coptops fuscus (Olivier, 1792); Coptops quadristigma Fahraeus, 1872; Lachnia (Coptops) parallela Audinet-Serville, 1835; Lamia aedificator Fabricius, 1792; Phymasterna inhambanensis Bertoloni, 1876; Coptops bidens (Fabricius)

Species of beetle

Coptops aedificator, the Albizia long-horned beetle, is a species of beetle in the family Cerambycidae. It was described by Johan Christian Fabricius in 1792, originally under the genus Lamia. It is known from Djibouti, Tanzania, the Democratic Republic of the Congo, Ethiopia, Oman, Gabon, India, Madagascar, Malawi, Namibia, Nigeria, Saudi Arabia, the Ivory Coast, Cameroon, Senegal, South Africa, Seychelles, Mauritius, Sri Lanka, and Zambia. It was also introduced into Cape Verde, Hawaii, and Taiwan. It feeds on Theobroma cacao and several Coffea species, including C. arabica, C. canephora, and C. liberica var. dewevrei.
