= Coptops huberi =

Scientific classification
- Domain: Eukaryota
- Kingdom: Animalia
- Phylum: Arthropoda
- Class: Insecta
- Order: Coleoptera
- Suborder: Polyphaga
- Infraorder: Cucujiformia
- Family: Cerambycidae
- Genus: Coptops
- Species: C. huberi

Binomial name
- Coptops huberi Siess, 1970

Species of beetle

Coptops huberi is a species of beetle in the family Cerambycidae. It was described by Siess in 1970. It is known from Sri Lanka.
