= Coptops intermissa =

Scientific classification
- Kingdom: Animalia
- Phylum: Arthropoda
- Clade: Pancrustacea
- Class: Insecta
- Order: Coleoptera
- Suborder: Polyphaga
- Infraorder: Cucujiformia
- Family: Cerambycidae
- Genus: Coptops
- Species: C. intermissa

Binomial name
- Coptops intermissa Pascoe, 1883

Species of beetle

Coptops intermissa is a species of beetle in the family Cerambycidae. It was described by Francis Polkinghorne Pascoe in 1883. It is known from Sulawesi.
