= Coptops nigropunctata =

Scientific classification
- Kingdom: Animalia
- Phylum: Arthropoda
- Class: Insecta
- Order: Coleoptera
- Suborder: Polyphaga
- Infraorder: Cucujiformia
- Family: Cerambycidae
- Genus: Coptops
- Species: C. nigropunctata

Binomial name
- Coptops nigropunctata Fairmaire, 1871

Synonyms
- Coptops nigropunctatus Fairmaire, 1871

Species of beetle

Coptops nigropunctata is a species of beetle in the family Cerambycidae. It was described by Fairmaire in 1871, originally as C. nigropunctatus. It is known from Comoros.
