= Xylotrechus integer =

Scientific classification
- Kingdom: Animalia
- Phylum: Arthropoda
- Clade: Pancrustacea
- Class: Insecta
- Order: Coleoptera
- Suborder: Polyphaga
- Infraorder: Cucujiformia
- Family: Cerambycidae
- Genus: Xylotrechus
- Species: X. integer

Binomial name
- Xylotrechus integer (Haldeman, 1847)

Species of beetle

Xylotrechus integer is a species of beetle in the family Cerambycidae. It was described by Haldeman in 1847. This species is known for being located in the Maritime provinces, Quebec, and are very common and widespread throughout Ontario, Canada.
