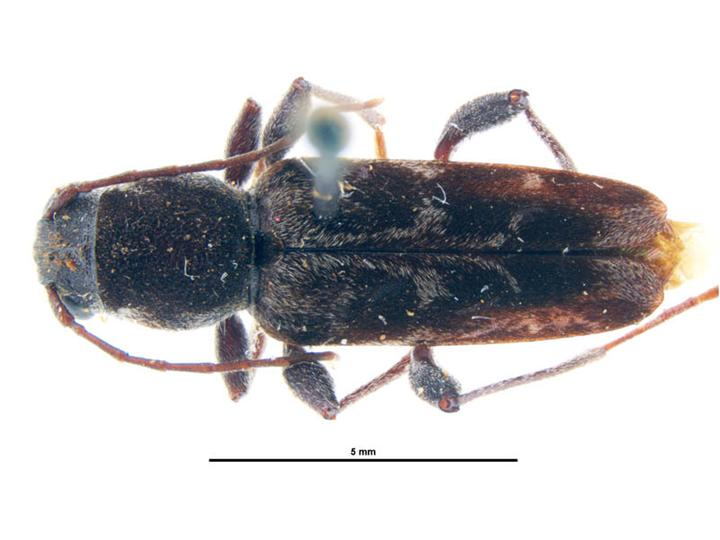

Scientific classification
- Kingdom: Animalia
- Phylum: Arthropoda
- Class: Insecta
- Order: Coleoptera
- Suborder: Polyphaga
- Infraorder: Cucujiformia
- Family: Cerambycidae
- Genus: Xylotrechus
- Species: X. lengi

Binomial name
- Xylotrechus lengi Schaeffer, 1908

= Xylotrechus lengi =

Species of beetle

Xylotrechus lengi is a species of beetle in the family Cerambycidae. It was described by Schaeffer in 1908.
