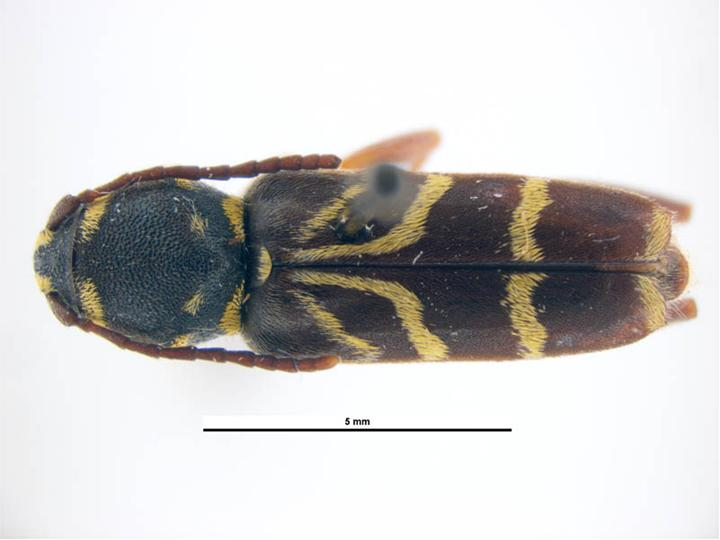

Scientific classification
- Kingdom: Animalia
- Phylum: Arthropoda
- Class: Insecta
- Order: Coleoptera
- Suborder: Polyphaga
- Infraorder: Cucujiformia
- Family: Cerambycidae
- Genus: Xylotrechus
- Species: X. nitidus

Binomial name
- Xylotrechus nitidus (Horn, 1860)

= Xylotrechus nitidus =

Species of beetle

Xylotrechus nitidus is a species of beetle in the family Cerambycidae. It was described by George Henry Horn in 1860.
