= Xylotrechus gemellus =

Scientific classification
- Kingdom: Animalia
- Phylum: Arthropoda
- Class: Insecta
- Order: Coleoptera
- Suborder: Polyphaga
- Infraorder: Cucujiformia
- Family: Cerambycidae
- Genus: Xylotrechus
- Species: X. gemellus

Binomial name
- Xylotrechus gemellus Casey, 1893

Species of beetle

Xylotrechus gemellus is a species of beetle in the family Cerambycidae. It was described by Casey in 1893 from a single specimen from Indiana, which remains the only specimen in existence, and the species is presumed to be extinct.
