= Coptops vomicosa =

Scientific classification
- Kingdom: Animalia
- Phylum: Arthropoda
- Class: Insecta
- Order: Coleoptera
- Suborder: Polyphaga
- Infraorder: Cucujiformia
- Family: Cerambycidae
- Genus: Coptops
- Species: C. vomicosa

Binomial name
- Coptops vomicosa (Pascoe, 1862)

Synonyms
- Abryna vomicosa Pascoe, 1862

Species of beetle

Coptops vomicosa is a species of beetle in the family Cerambycidae. It was described by Francis Polkinghorne Pascoe in 1862. The species is known from Vietnam and Cambodia.
