= Xylotrechus convergens =

Scientific classification
- Kingdom: Animalia
- Phylum: Arthropoda
- Class: Insecta
- Order: Coleoptera
- Suborder: Polyphaga
- Infraorder: Cucujiformia
- Family: Cerambycidae
- Genus: Xylotrechus
- Species: X. convergens

Binomial name
- Xylotrechus convergens LeConte, 1873

Species of beetle

Xylotrechus convergens is a species of beetle in the family Cerambycidae. It was described by John Lawrence LeConte in 1873.
