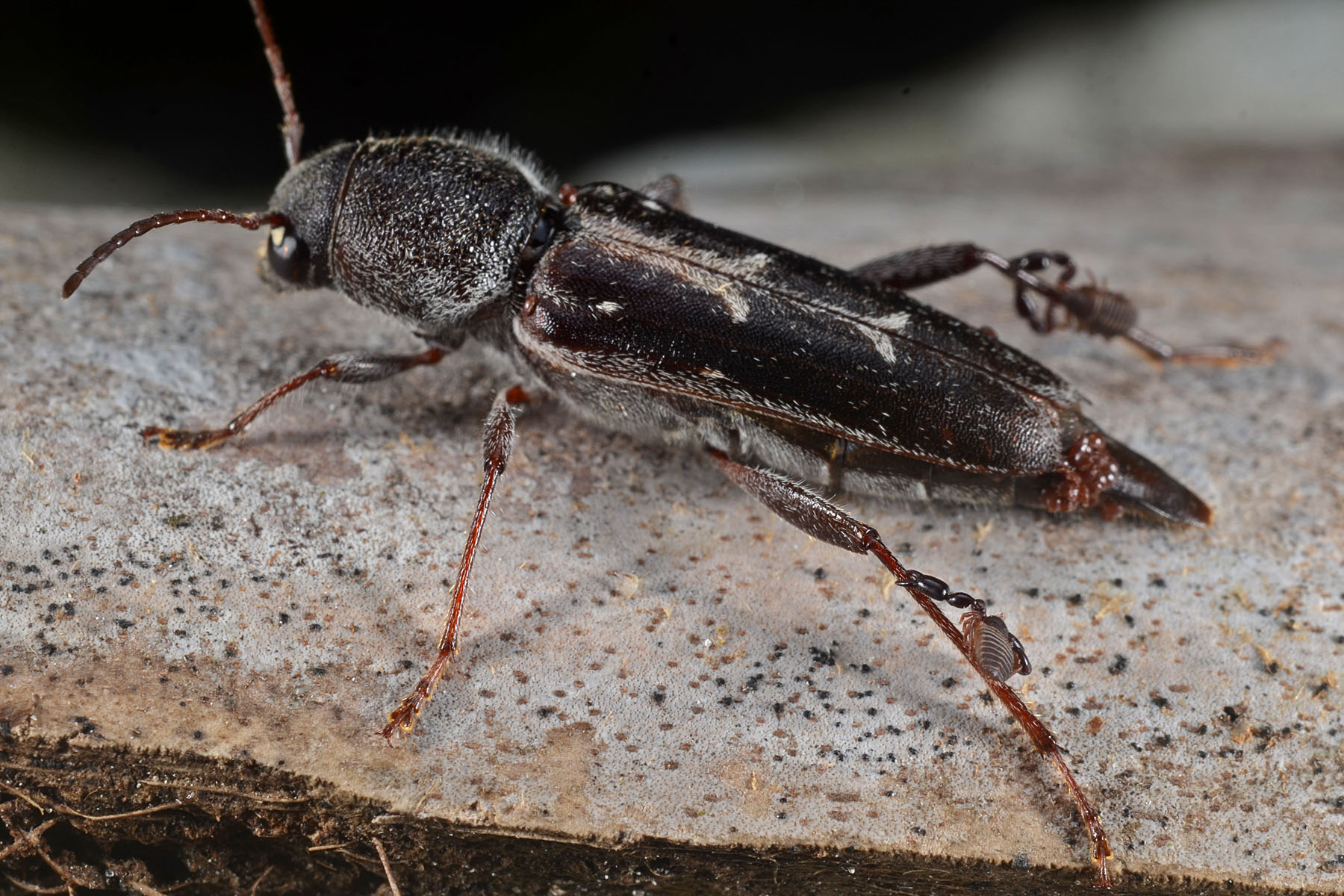

Scientific classification
- Kingdom: Animalia
- Phylum: Arthropoda
- Class: Insecta
- Order: Coleoptera
- Suborder: Polyphaga
- Infraorder: Cucujiformia
- Family: Cerambycidae
- Genus: Xylotrechus
- Species: X. sagittatus

Binomial name
- Xylotrechus sagittatus (Germar, 1821)

= Xylotrechus sagittatus =

Species of beetle

Xylotrechus sagittatus is a species of beetle in the family Cerambycidae. It was described by Ernst Friedrich Germar in 1821. Common names for this species include Arrowhead Borer and Pine Bark Runner.
