= Insulochamus =

Scientific classification
- Domain: Eukaryota
- Kingdom: Animalia
- Phylum: Arthropoda
- Class: Insecta
- Order: Coleoptera
- Suborder: Polyphaga
- Infraorder: Cucujiformia
- Family: Cerambycidae
- Subfamily: Lamiinae
- Genus: Insulochamus; Dillon & Dillon, 1961

Genus of beetles

Insulochamus is a genus of beetle in the family Cerambycidae.

== Species ==
- Insulochamus annobonae (Aurivillius, 1928)
- Insulochamus nicoletii (Thomson, 1857)
- Insulochamus thomensis (Jordan, 1903)
