= Insulochamus nicoletii =

Scientific classification
- Kingdom: Animalia
- Phylum: Arthropoda
- Class: Insecta
- Order: Coleoptera
- Suborder: Polyphaga
- Infraorder: Cucujiformia
- Family: Cerambycidae
- Genus: Insulochamus
- Species: I. nicoletii

Binomial name
- Insulochamus nicoletii (Thomson, 1857)

Synonyms
- Monohammus nicoletii Thomson, 1857; Monochamus nicoleti Thomson, 1857 (misspelling); Monochamus fulvisparsus Gahan, 1888

Species of beetle

Insulochamus nicoletii is a species of beetle in the family Cerambycidae. It was described by James Thomson in 1857. It is known from the Democratic Republic of the Congo.
