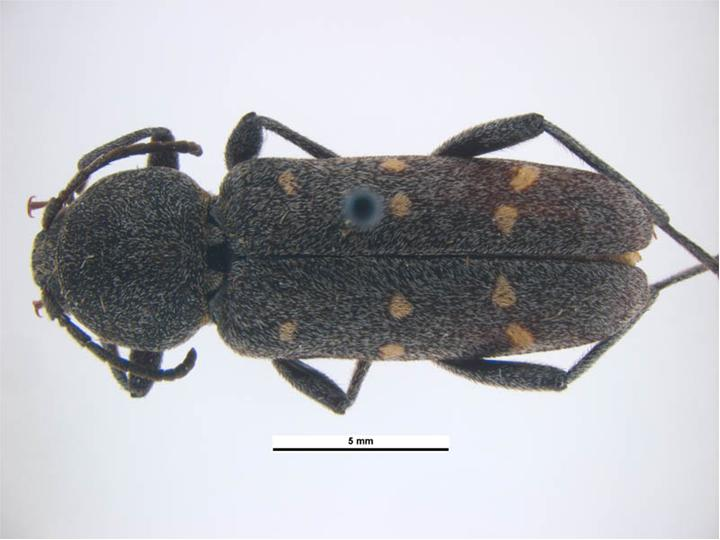

Scientific classification
- Kingdom: Animalia
- Phylum: Arthropoda
- Class: Insecta
- Order: Coleoptera
- Suborder: Polyphaga
- Infraorder: Cucujiformia
- Family: Cerambycidae
- Genus: Xylotrechus
- Species: X. mormonus

Binomial name
- Xylotrechus mormonus (LeConte, 1861)

= Xylotrechus mormonus =

Species of beetle

Xylotrechus mormonus is a species of beetle in the family Cerambycidae. It was described by John Lawrence LeConte in 1861.
