= Peperomia vulcanica =

Scientific classification
- Kingdom: Plantae
- Clade: Tracheophytes
- Clade: Angiosperms
- Clade: Magnoliids
- Order: Piperales
- Family: Piperaceae
- Genus: Peperomia
- Species: P. vulcanica

Binomial name
- Peperomia vulcanica Baker & C.H.Wright

Synonyms
- Peperomia annobonensis Mildbr. (1937); Peperomia hygrophila Engl. (1911); Peperomia monticola auct.

Species of plant

Peperomia vulcanica is a species of herbaceous flowering plants of the family Piperaceae.

== Description ==
It is a creeping plant, rooting at nodes. It has erect lateral branches that are 20–30 cm tall.

== Distribution ==
The species is found in rocky areas and rarely as an epiphyte at 250 to 2400 m elevation in São Tomé and Príncipe, Annobón and Liberia.
