= Xylotrechus annobonae =

Scientific classification
- Kingdom: Animalia
- Phylum: Arthropoda
- Clade: Pancrustacea
- Class: Insecta
- Order: Coleoptera
- Suborder: Polyphaga
- Infraorder: Cucujiformia
- Family: Cerambycidae
- Genus: Xylotrechus
- Species: X. annobonae

Binomial name
- Xylotrechus annobonae Aurivillius, 1910

Species of beetle

Xylotrechus annobonae is a species of longhorn beetles in the family Cerambycidae. The species is endemic to the island of Annobón in Equatorial Guinea. The species was named by Christopher Aurivillius in 1910.
