= Pterolophia annobonae =

Scientific classification
- Domain: Eukaryota
- Kingdom: Animalia
- Phylum: Arthropoda
- Class: Insecta
- Order: Coleoptera
- Suborder: Polyphaga
- Infraorder: Cucujiformia
- Family: Cerambycidae
- Tribe: Pteropliini
- Genus: Pterolophia
- Species: P. annobonae

Binomial name
- Pterolophia annobonae Aurivillius, 1910

Species of beetle

Pterolophia annobonae is a species of beetle in the family Cerambycidae. It was described by Swedish entomologist Per Olof Christopher Aurivillius in 1910 and occurs on the island of Annobón, Equatorial Guinea.
