= Insulochamus annobonae =

Scientific classification
- Kingdom: Animalia
- Phylum: Arthropoda
- Class: Insecta
- Order: Coleoptera
- Suborder: Polyphaga
- Infraorder: Cucujiformia
- Family: Cerambycidae
- Genus: Insulochamus
- Species: I. annobonae

Binomial name
- Insulochamus annobonae (Aurivillius, 1928)

Synonyms
- Monochamus annobonae Aurivillius, 1928

Species of insect

Insulochamus annobonae is a species of beetle in the family Cerambycidae. It was described by Per Olof Christopher Aurivillius as Monochamus annobonae in 1928. It occurs on the island of Annobón, Equatorial Guinea.
