= Thecacoris trichogyne =

Scientific classification
- Kingdom: Plantae
- Clade: Tracheophytes
- Clade: Angiosperms
- Clade: Eudicots
- Clade: Rosids
- Order: Malpighiales
- Family: Phyllanthaceae
- Genus: Thecacoris
- Species: T. trichogyne

Binomial name
- Thecacoris trichogyne Müll.Arg.

Synonyms
- Thecacoris annobonae Pax & K.Hoffm.; Thecacoris lenifolia J.Léonard

Species of plant

Thecacoris trichogyne, synonym Thecacoris annobonae, is a species of plant in the family Phyllanthaceae. It is found in west-central and south tropical Africa (Angola, Cameroon, the Democratic Republic of the Congo, the Republic of the Congo, Gabon, the Gulf of Guinea Islands and Zambia). It is a shrub or tree and grows primarily in wet tropical habitats.

== Conservation ==
Thecacoris annobonae was assessed as "endangered" in the 2004 IUCN Red List, where it is said to be native only to Annobón and Cameroon. As of February 2023, this species regarded as a synonym of Thecacoris trichogyne, which has a wider distribution.
