= Alvania annobonensis =

Scientific classification
- Kingdom: Animalia
- Phylum: Mollusca
- Class: Gastropoda
- Subclass: Caenogastropoda
- Order: Littorinimorpha
- Family: Rissoidae
- Genus: Alvania
- Species: A. annobonensis

Binomial name
- Alvania annobonensis Rolán, 2004

Species of gastropod

Alvania annobonensis is a species of small sea snail, a marine gastropod mollusk or micromollusk in the family Rissoidae.

== Distribution ==
The species has been found at 8 m (26 ft) depth off the islet Tortuga, near the island of Annobón, Equatorial Guinea.
