= Coptops annobonae =

Scientific classification
- Kingdom: Animalia
- Phylum: Arthropoda
- Class: Insecta
- Order: Coleoptera
- Suborder: Polyphaga
- Infraorder: Cucujiformia
- Family: Cerambycidae
- Subfamily: Lamiinae
- Tribe: Mesosini
- Genus: Coptops
- Species: C. annobonae

Binomial name
- Coptops annobonae Aurivillius, 1910

Species of beetle

Coptops annobonae is a species of beetle in the family Cerambycidae. It was described by Aurivillius in 1910. It occurs on the island of Annobón, Equatorial Guinea.
