= Mitrella annobonensis =

Scientific classification
- Kingdom: Animalia
- Phylum: Mollusca
- Class: Gastropoda
- Subclass: Caenogastropoda
- Order: Neogastropoda
- Family: Columbellidae
- Genus: Mitrella
- Species: M. annobonensis

Binomial name
- Mitrella annobonensis Rolán, 2005

Species of gastropod

Mitrella annobonensis is a species of sea snail in the family Columbellidae, the dove snails.

== Distribution ==
The species occurs off the island of Annobón, Equatorial Guinea.
