= Mutatocoptops =

Scientific classification
- Kingdom: Animalia
- Phylum: Arthropoda
- Class: Insecta
- Order: Coleoptera
- Suborder: Polyphaga
- Infraorder: Cucujiformia
- Family: Cerambycidae
- Subfamily: Lamiinae
- Tribe: Mesosini
- Genus: Mutatocoptops; Pic, 1925

Genus of beetles

Mutatocoptops is a genus of longhorn beetles of the subfamily Lamiinae, containing the following species:

- Mutatocoptops alboapicalis Pic, 1925
- Mutatocoptops anancyloides (Schwarzer, 1925)
- Mutatocoptops annulicornis (Heller, 1926)
- Mutatocoptops bituberosa (Pascoe, 1866)
- Mutatocoptops borneensis Breuning, 1968
- Mutatocoptops cambodgensis Breuning, 1974
- Mutatocoptops celebensis Breuning, 1964
- Mutatocoptops diversa (Pascoe, 1865)
- Mutatocoptops malaisiana Breuning, 1973
- Mutatocoptops similis Breuning, 1935
- Mutatocoptops tonkinea Pic, 1925
