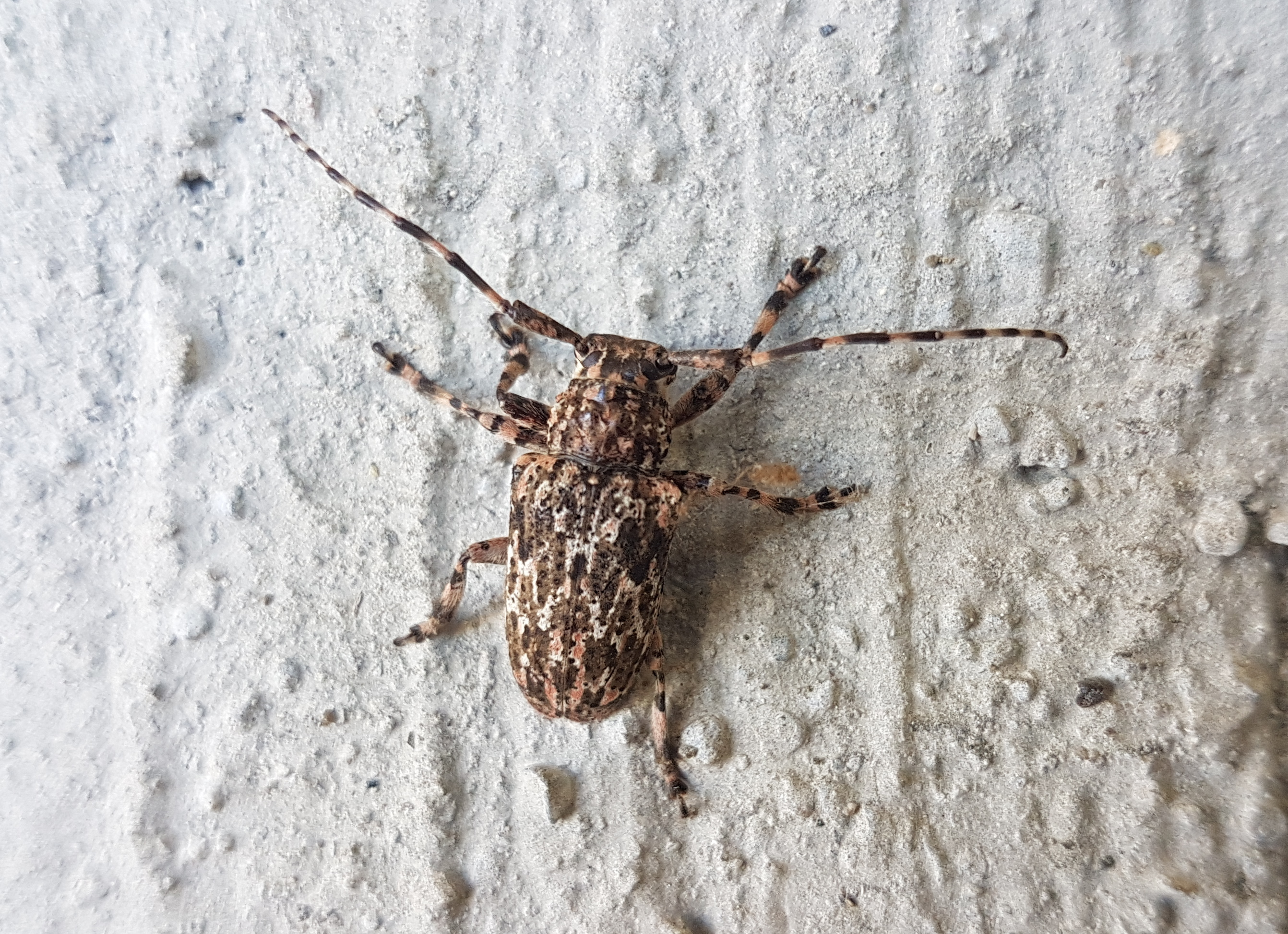
- Coptops tetrica from Mindanao, Philippines

Scientific classification
- Domain: Eukaryota
- Kingdom: Animalia
- Phylum: Arthropoda
- Class: Insecta
- Order: Coleoptera
- Suborder: Polyphaga
- Infraorder: Cucujiformia
- Family: Cerambycidae
- Tribe: Mesosini
- Genus: Coptops; Audinet-Serville, 1835

= Coptops =

Genus of beetles

Coptops is a genus of longhorn beetles of the subfamily Lamiinae, containing the following species:

- Coptops aedificator (Fabricius, 1792) - Albizia long-horned beetle
- Coptops alboirrorata Fuchs, 1966
- Coptops albonotata (Pic, 1917)
- Coptops andamanica Breuning, 1935
- Coptops annamensis Breuning, 1938
- Coptops annobonae Aurivillius, 1910
- Coptops annulipes Gahan, 1864
- Coptops brunnea Breuning, 1936
- Coptops cameroni Breuning, 1978
- Coptops diversesparsa (Pic, 1917)
- Coptops huberi Siess, 1970
- Coptops humerosa Fairmaire, 1871
- Coptops hypocrita Lameere, 1892
- Coptops illicita Pascoe, 1865
- Coptops intermissa Pascoe, 1883
- Coptops leucostictica White, 1858
- Coptops lichenea Pascoe, 1865
- Coptops liturata (Klug, 1833)
- Coptops marmorea Breuning, 1939
- Coptops mourgliai Villiers, 1974
- Coptops nigropunctata Fairmaire, 1871
- Coptops ocellifera Breuning, 1964
- Coptops olivacea Breuning, 1935
- Coptops pacifica Breuning, 1969
- Coptops pardalis (Pascoe, 1862)
- Coptops pascoei Gahan, 1894
- Coptops purpureomixta (Pic, 1926)
- Coptops robustipes (Pic, 1925)
- Coptops rosacea Breuning, 1980
- Coptops rufa Thomson, 1878
- Coptops rugosicollis Breuning, 1968
- Coptops semiscalaris (Pic, 1928)
- Coptops similis Breuning, 1935
- Coptops szechuanica Gressitt, 1951
- Coptops tetrica (Newman, 1842)
- Coptops thibetana Breuning, 1974
- Coptops undulata Pascoe, 1865
- Coptops variegata Breuning, 1938
- Coptops vomicosa (Pascoe, 1862)
