= Bird cherry =

List of plants with the same or similar names

Bird cherry is a common name for the Eurasian plant Prunus padus (also, "black dogwood", "hogberry").

Bird cherry may also refer to:

- Prunus subg. Padus, a group of species closely related to Prunus padus
- Prunus avium, (also, "wild cherry", "sweet cherry", "mazzard cherry", "gean"); the Latin epithet avium refers to its consumption by birds.
- Prunus pensylvanica, (also, "fire cherry", "pin cherry"), native to North America
- Prunus serotina var. salicifolia, sometimes called the Mexican bird cherry
