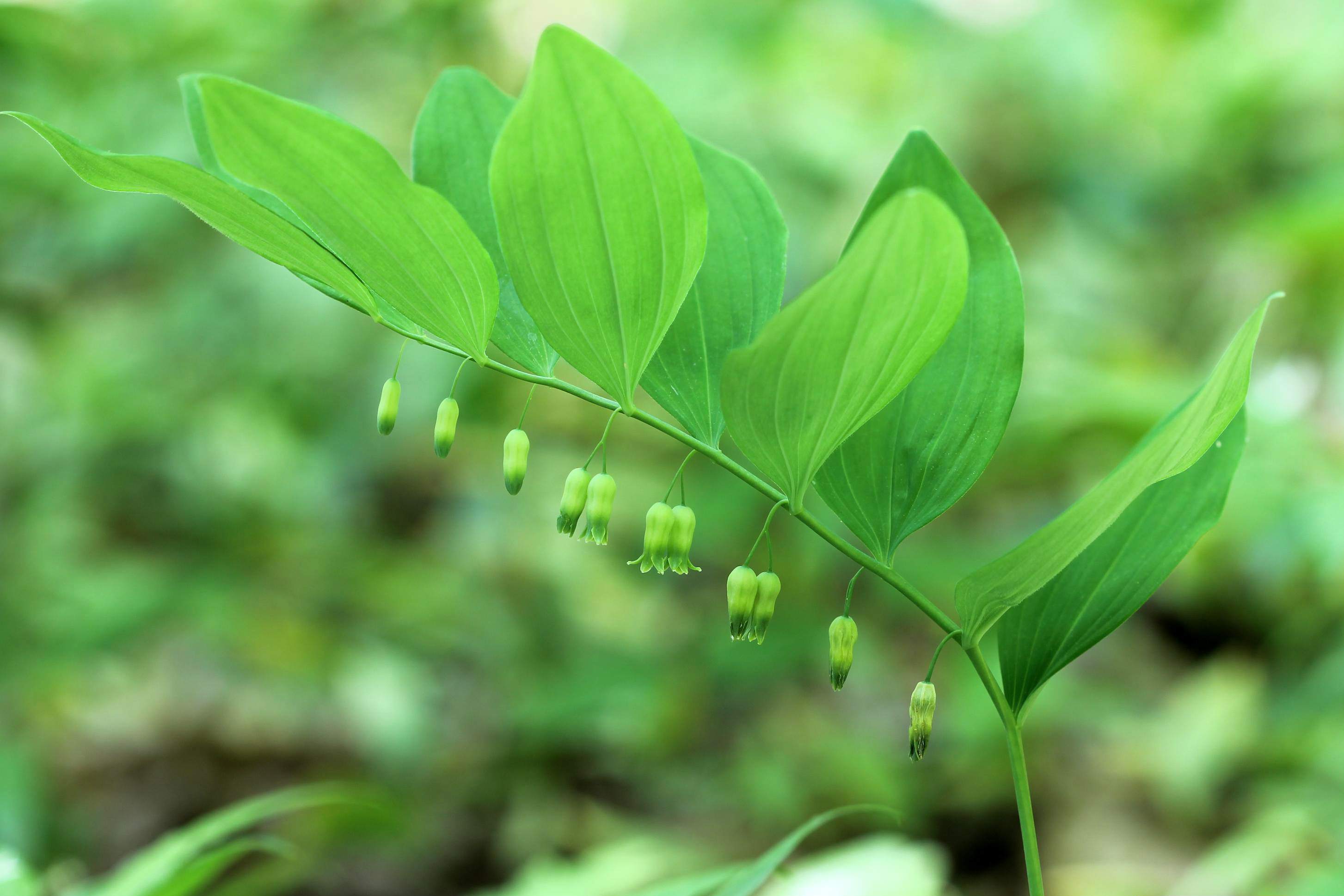
- In bloom
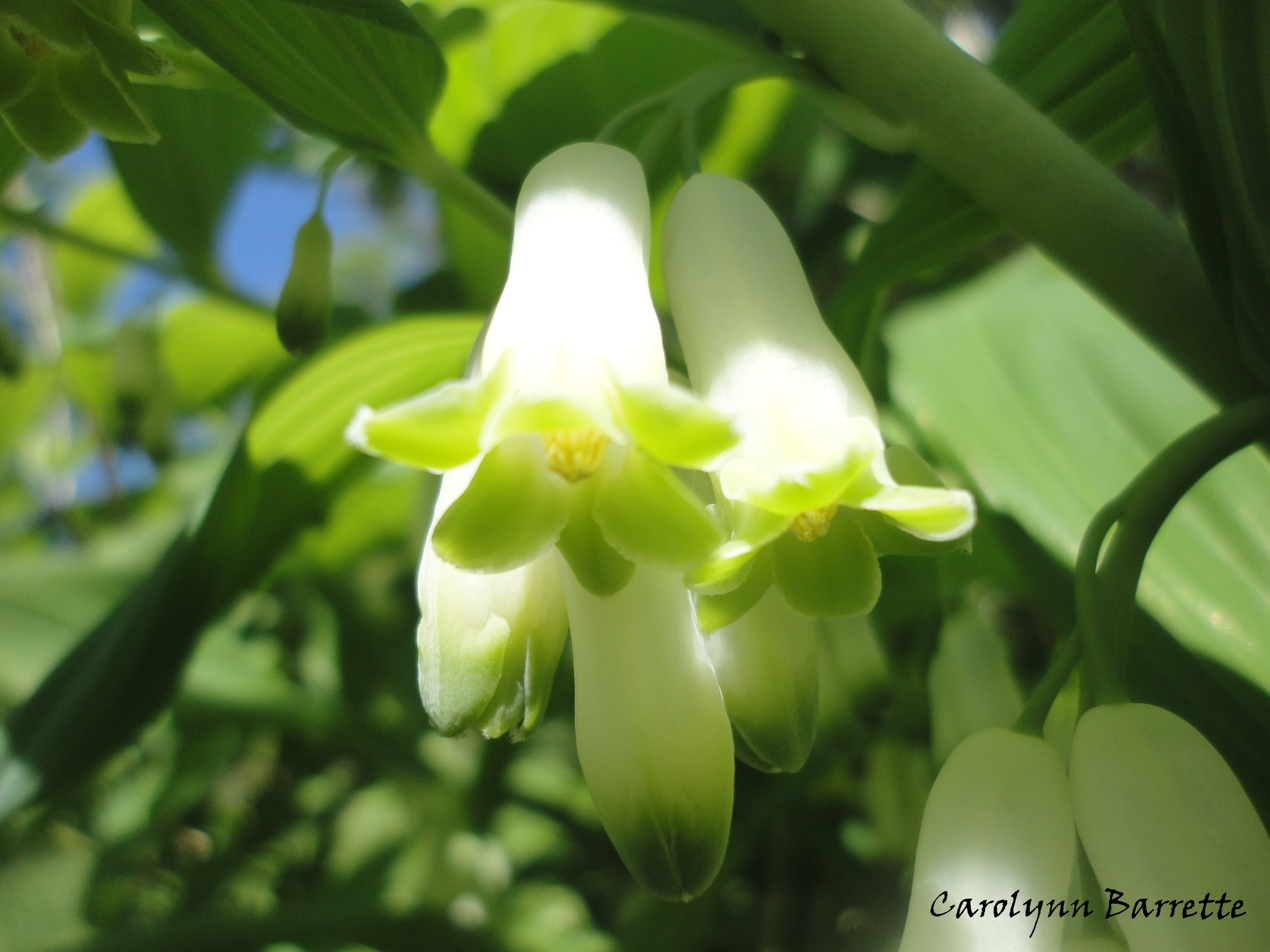
- Close up of flowers

Scientific classification
- Kingdom: Plantae
- Clade: Embryophytes
- Clade: Tracheophytes
- Clade: Angiosperms
- Clade: Monocots
- Order: Asparagales
- Family: Asparagaceae
- Subfamily: Convallarioideae
- Genus: Polygonatum
- Species: P. pubescens

Binomial name
- Polygonatum pubescens (Willd.) Pursh

Synonyms
- List: Convallaria pubescens Willd.; Polygonatum boreale Greene; Polygonatum boreale var. australe Farw.; Polygonatum boreale var. multflorum Farw.; Polygonatum cuneatum Greene; Polygonatum farwellii Bush; Polygonatum multiflorum var. pubescens (Willd.) Alph.Wood; Polygonatum pubescens subvar. australe (Farw.) Farw.; Polygonatum pubescens var. australe (Farw.) R.R.Gates; Polygonatum pubescens var. boreale (Greene) Farw.; Polygonatum pubescens var. cuneatum (Greene) Farw.; Polygonatum pubescens f. cuneatum (Greene) Vict.; Polygonatum pubescens f. fultius Fernald & S.K.Harris; Polygonatum pubescens var. multiflorum (Farw.) Farw.

= Polygonatum pubescens =

Species of flowering plant

Polygonatum pubescens, the hairy Solomon's seal or downy Solomon's seal, is a species of flowering plant in the family Asparagaceae, native to the north-central and eastern US and eastern Canada. It is a forest gap specialist.
