= Prunus perulata =

Scientific classification
- Kingdom: Plantae
- Clade: Tracheophytes
- Clade: Angiosperms
- Clade: Eudicots
- Clade: Rosids
- Order: Rosales
- Family: Rosaceae
- Genus: Prunus
- Subgenus: Prunus subg. Padus
- Species: P. perulata

Binomial name
- Prunus perulata Koehne

Synonyms
- Padus perulata (Koehne) T.T.Yu & T.C.Ku

Species of tree

Prunus perulata (Chinese: 宿鳞稠李) is a species of bird cherry native to Sichuan and Yunnan in China, preferring to grow at 2400–3200 m. It is a tree typically 6–12 m tall. Its flowers are borne on a raceme, quite small, with dull white to creamy-yellow petals. Its closest relative is Prunus buergeriana, from which it is morphologically and genetically distinct.

== Ecology ==
Its fruit are consumed by the endangered Yunnan snub-nosed monkey, Rhinopithecus bieti. It is a forest gap specialist, taking advantage of treefalls to establish at the shadier edges of gaps.
