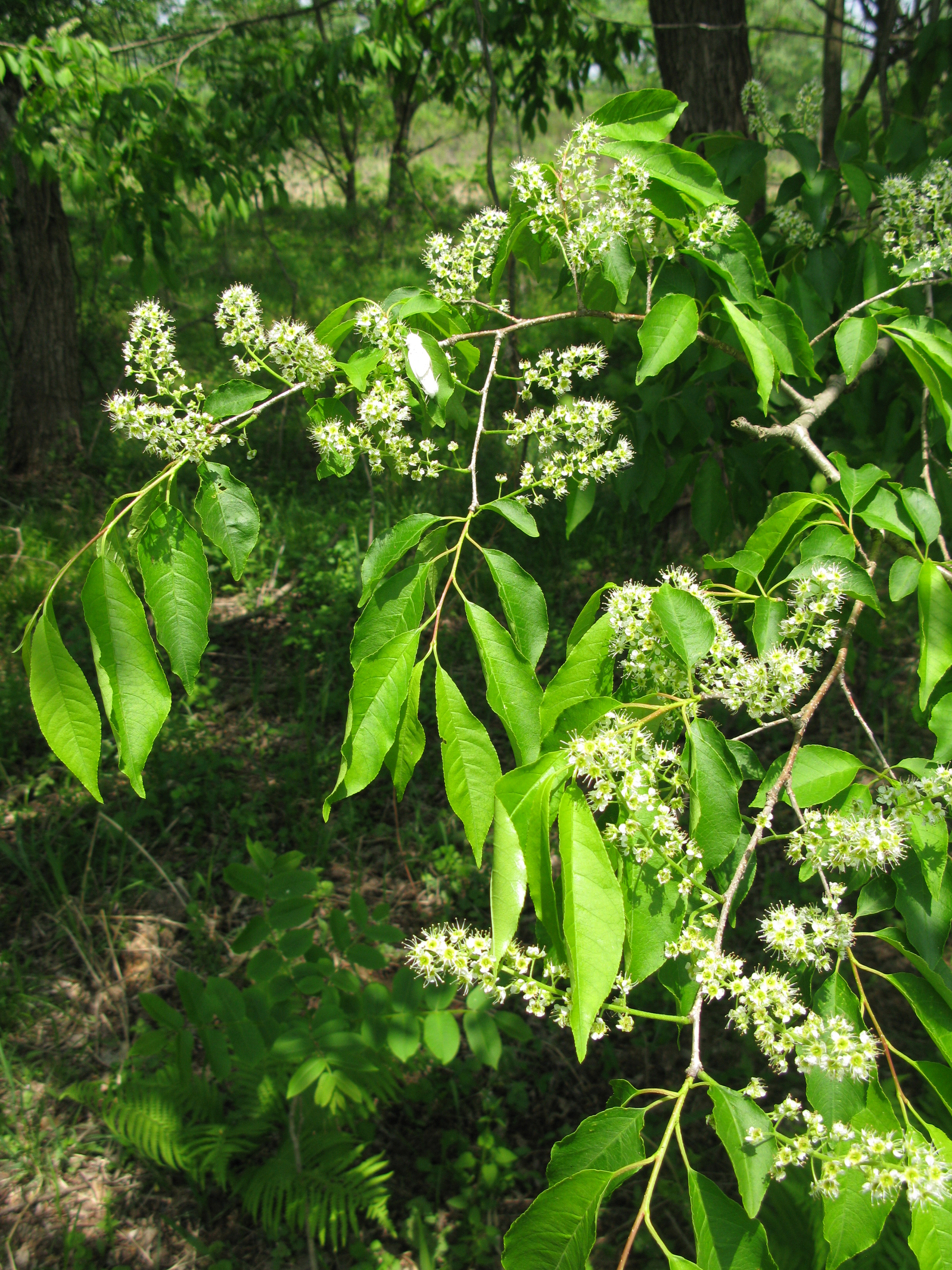
- Flowers and foliage

Scientific classification
- Kingdom: Plantae
- Clade: Tracheophytes
- Clade: Angiosperms
- Clade: Eudicots
- Clade: Rosids
- Order: Rosales
- Family: Rosaceae
- Genus: Prunus
- Subgenus: Prunus subg. Padus
- Species: P. buergeriana

Binomial name
- Prunus buergeriana Miq.

Synonyms
- Padus buergeriana (Miq.) T.T.Yü and T. C. Ku; Laurocerasus buergeriana (Miq.) C. K. Schneid.; Prunus adenodonta Merr.; Prunus fauriei H.Lév.; Prunus venosa Koehne

= Prunus buergeriana =

Species of tree

Prunus buergeriana, in Japanese イヌザクラ (inu-zakura), meaning dog cherry, is a species of bird cherry native to Japan, Korea, Taiwan, China, northeast India (Sikkim), and Bhutan. In China it prefers to grow on mountain slopes at 1000 to 3400 m above sea level. Its closest relative is Prunus perulata, from which it is morphologically and genetically distinct.

== Description ==
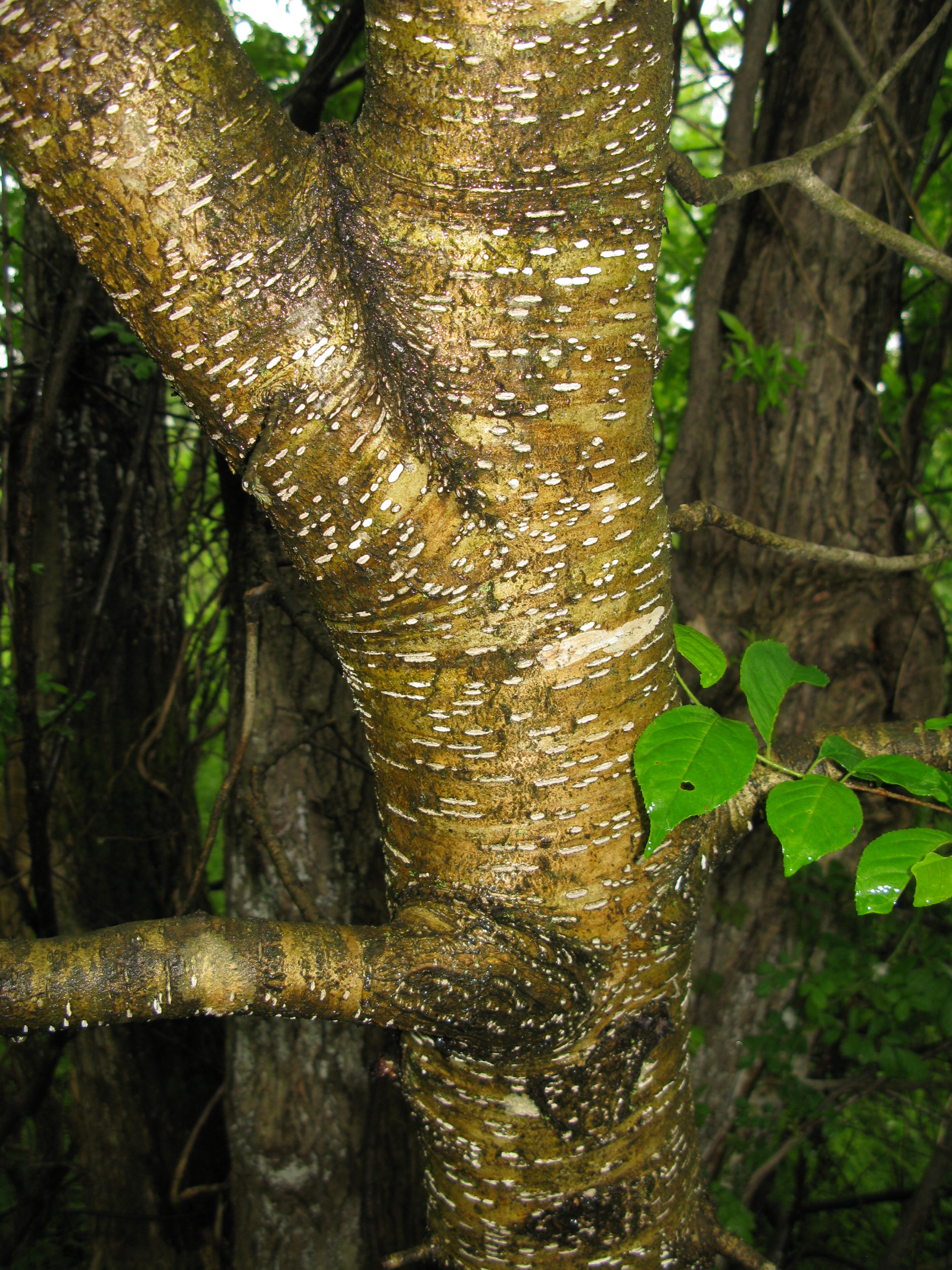
The bark is brown with pale eyes

Prunus buergeriana individuals usually reach a height of 6–12 metres (20–39 ft). The small flowers are borne on a raceme. The fruit ripen from green through red to black.

== Cultural significance ==
Considered an unlovely tree in Japan, the dog cherry is used as a simile in Japanese haiku for unflattering comparisons with dogs; in these the paltry raceme resembles the tail of a whipped cur, or the spotted bark the markings of a starving mongrel.

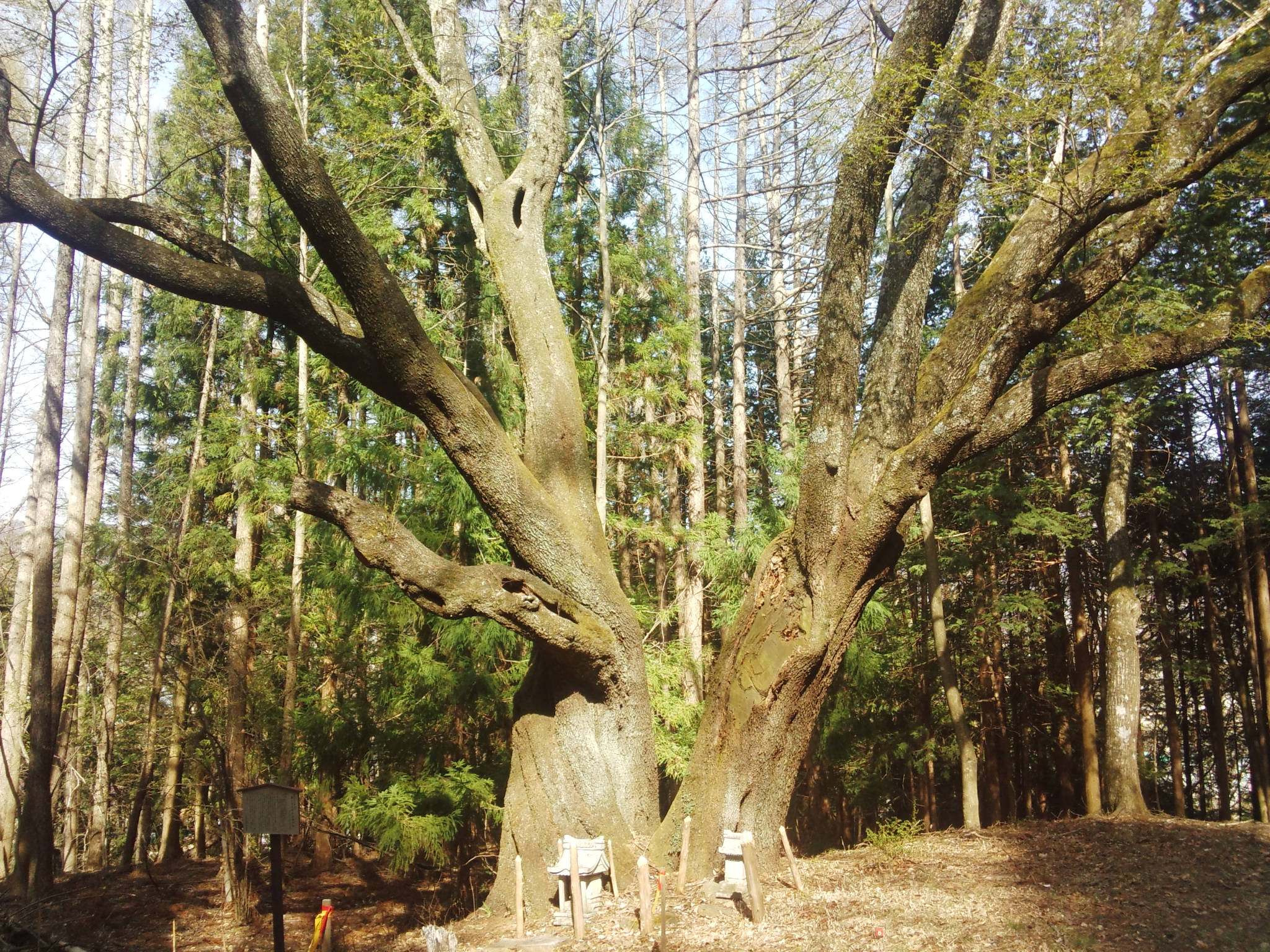
The Mine-tatae (峰湛), a large specimen growing in the Suwa Grand Shrine and the subject of veneration
