= Light gap =

Ecological terminology

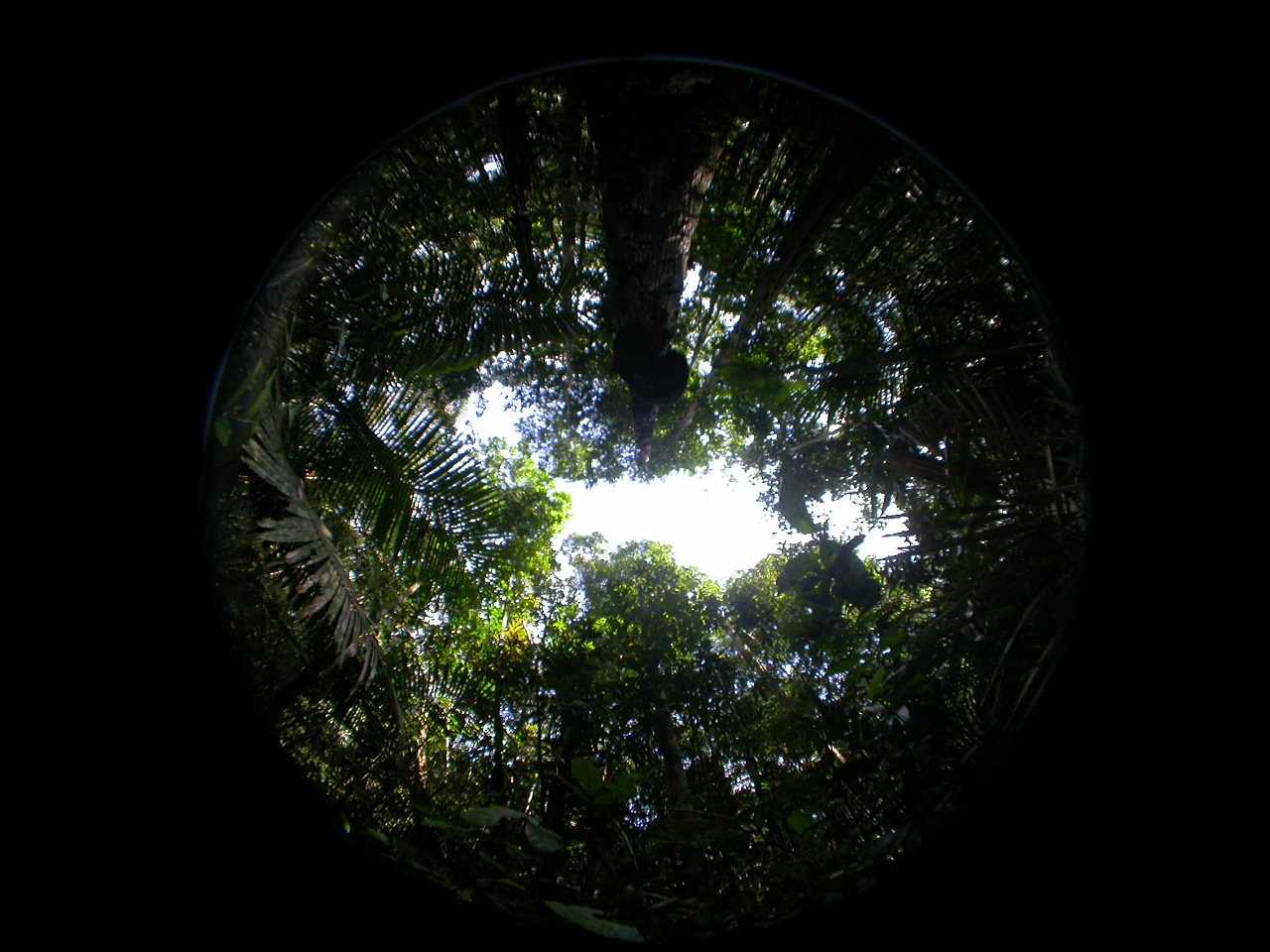
Small forest gap

In ecology, a light gap is a break in forest canopy or similar barrier that allows young plants to grow where they would be otherwise inhibited by the lack of light reaching the seedbed. Light gaps form predominantly when a tree falls, and thus produces an opening in the forest canopy. Light gaps are important for maintaining diversity in species-rich ecosystems.

== Occurrence ==
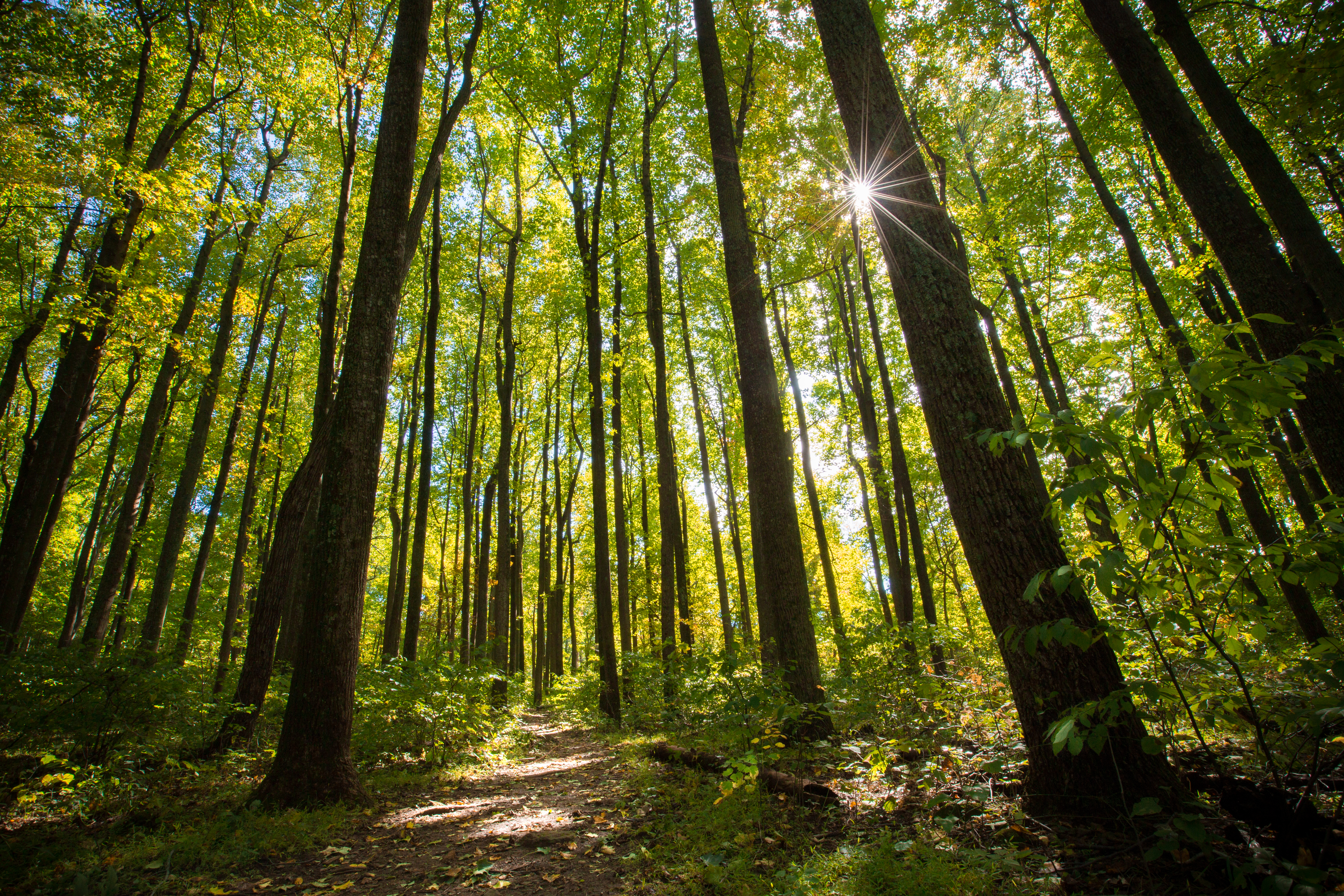
Light gap in Shenandoah National Park

There are many ways in which light gaps can form. A major occurrence is through previously mentioned treefall gaps. The death of a full-grown tree initiates a treefall gap, where light is exposed to the soil and creates resources for seeds and younger trees. Treefall gaps have been proven to maintain tree diversity by increasing stem density, which in turn can lead to species richness. Juvenile stems, or saplings, do an exceptional job at increasing stem density which increases species diversity as a result. Species compete for resources in order to regenerate. Succession can begin when treefall occurs because the newly lit area provides an area for a new population to grow. Trees that will grow in a treefall gap are not necessarily the most suited for that particular environment, but rather, grow by chance. Therefore, different organisms may experience a greater attraction to certain environments over others, which can also have an effect on the extent to which an area flourishes.

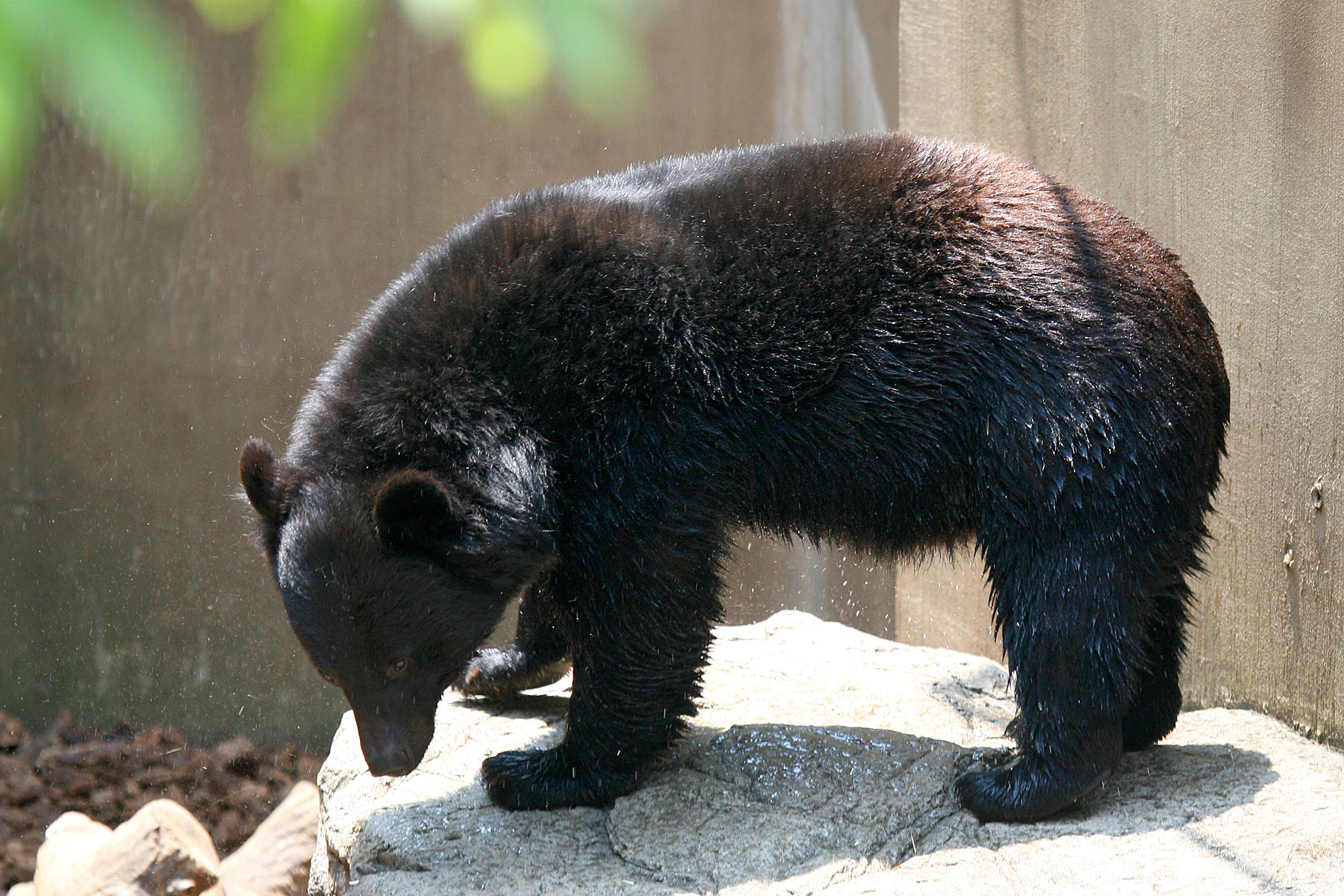
Japanese black bears create light gaps in the forest by breaking branches when they climb trees

An interesting example of gap formation comes from Japanese black bears and their effects on the forest canopy. When Japanese black bears are looking for fruit, they break off branches when climbing trees and as a result, small light gaps form in the canopies. Therefore, their search for food is improving the light conditions of understory plants, which in return benefits the bears, as this helps fruit they eat to grow more abundantly.

== Selected areas ==
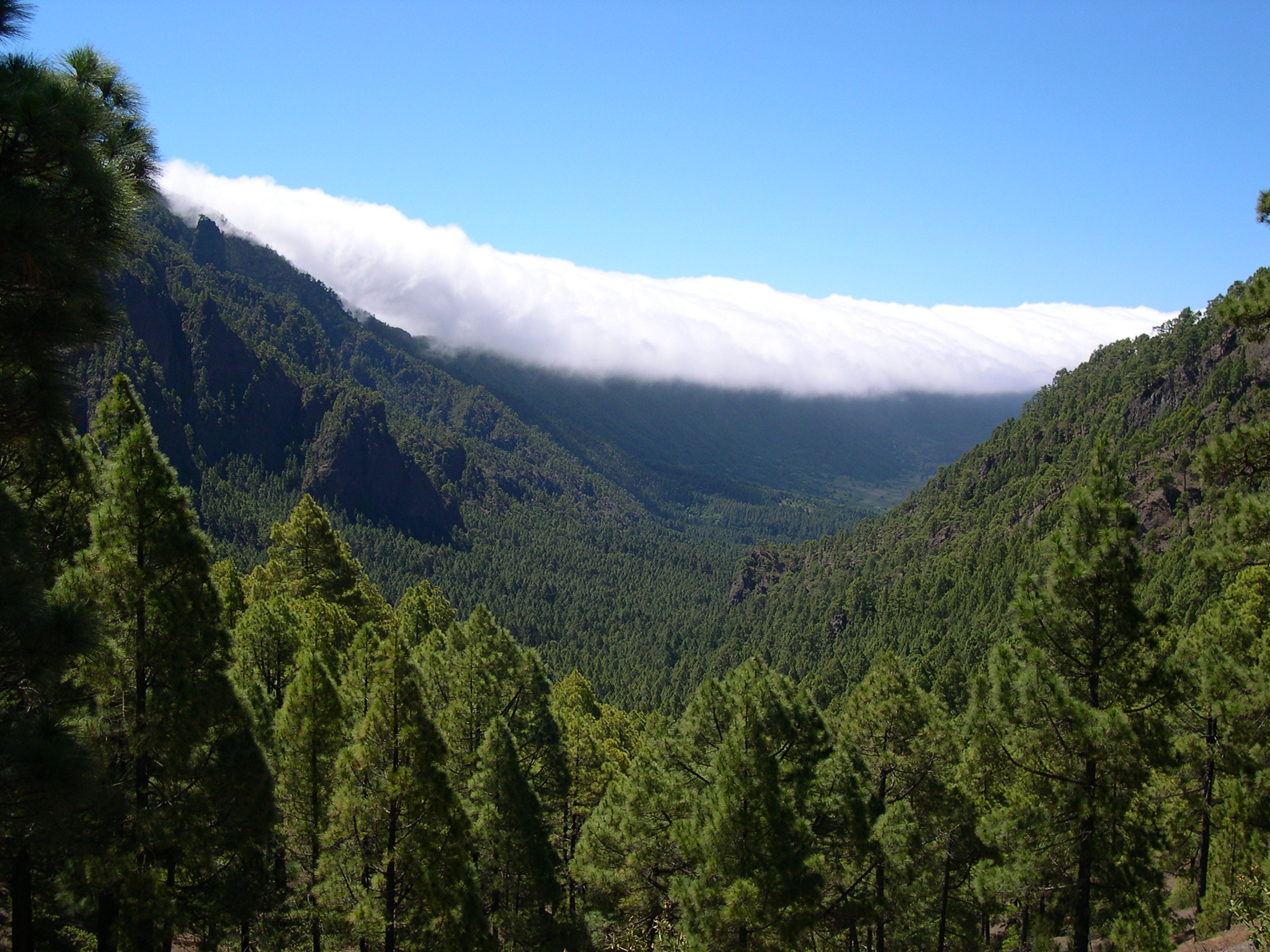
Conifer forest

On a report done in a Neotropical forest, the process of gap-phase regeneration is studied. Through conducted experiments, conclusions are confirmed about the gap-phase regeneration process. A tree fall forms a light gap, which stimulated growth, resulting in an increase in the stem density on the forest floor. Thus, in turn, allows multiple trees to grow back and ecosystems to prosper. Studies of gap dynamics have provided evidence for understanding many small disturbances in an ecosystem.

In a uniform and discontinuous conifer forest canopy, solar energy is projected at certain angles in the light gaps, which determine soil conditions and amount of snow accumulation. Depending on the time of year, the variety of tree species and the size of the light gap will determine how much light hits the forest floor and what kind of temporal and spatial heterogeneity will form.

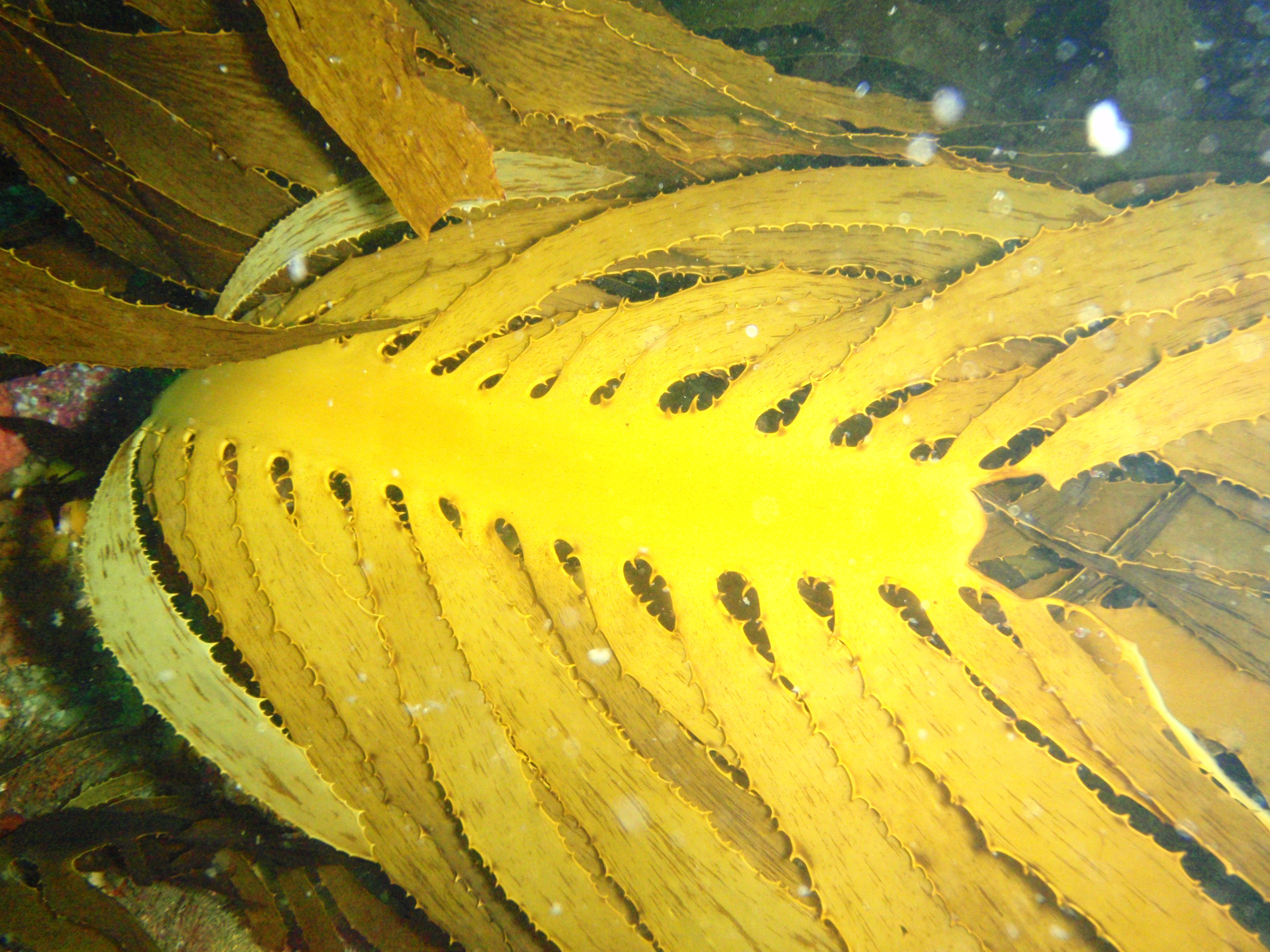
Ecklonia radiata at Tsitsikamma Marine Protected Area

In the coastal areas of south-eastern Australia, large brown kelp, another kind of canopy, formed by Ecklonia radiata, dominates the existing temperate reefs. Climate change in the area poses a direct effect on the underwater canopy cover, reducing its overall quality. Climate change is causing patches in the canopy layer and because of this loss of coverage, the understory becomes a prime place for benthic algae to grow. This affects other organisms, such a sponges and encrusting algae that are trying to grow on the reefs. This discovery has shown that although light gaps oftentimes produce positive outcomes, they can also negatively effect some members of the biotic community.

In the Amazon rainforest, light gaps are extensively studied. However, ways in which the understory is affected by light gaps there, remains mostly a mystery. Overall biomass in the light gap areas is directly impacted by the size of the light opening, the type of roots that pre-existed its formation, and the type of tree that fell to create the light gap. The quality of biomass determines the level of regrowth in the environment.

All types of canopy structures rely on the quality that seeds experience when developing. Seeds can grow better when they are protected, however, they also flourish to a greater extent when they are not in a shaded environment. In fact, some seeds are so sensitive that even a slight change in light can prevent it from surviving.

== Light gap herbivores ==
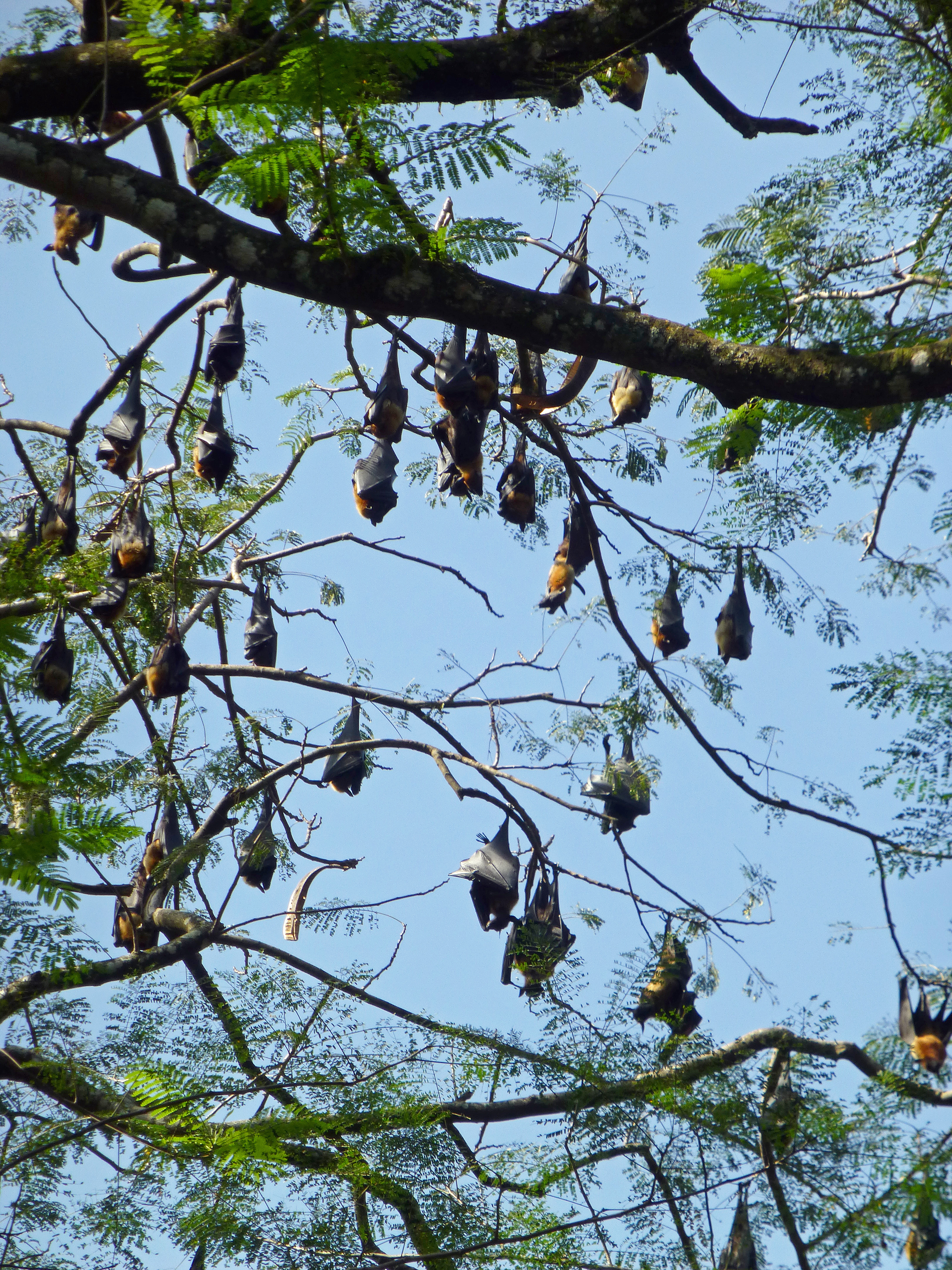
Fruit bats hanging in the trees at the Royal Botanic Gardens, Peradeniya, Sri Lanka

Light gap herbivores are animals that contribute to the creation of light gaps by feeding on the older plants. Some herbivorous animals include algae and bacteria in their diet. Insect herbivores target the shade-tolerant tree species. They cause a substantial amount of damage to the leaves of plants. There is more herbivory in tropical forests than in temperate forests.

== Effects on organisms and their ecosystems ==
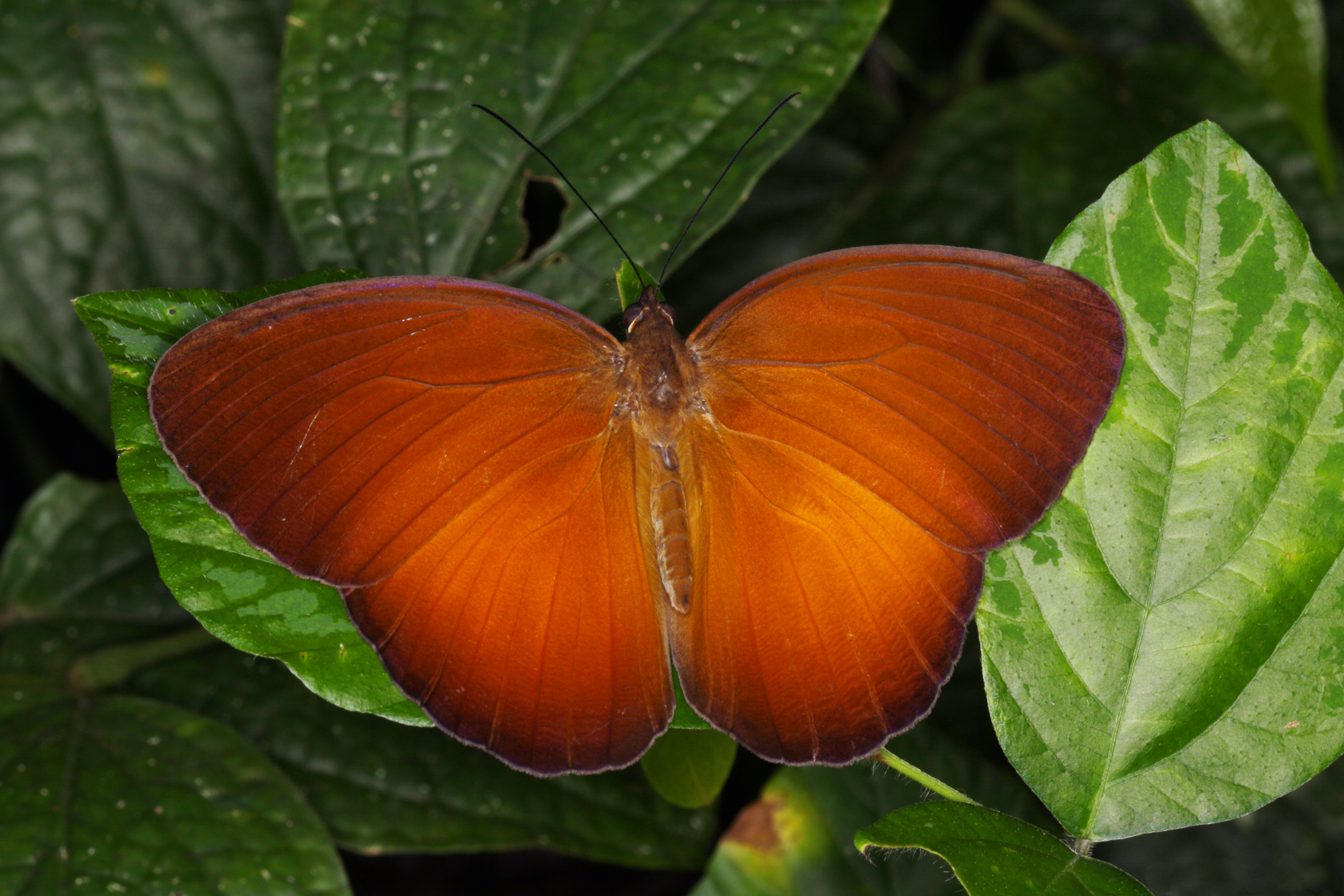
Faun in a mountain rainforest in central Sulawesi

Many organisms are directly affected by the formation of light gaps. In a tropical forest, butterflies, which are great biodiversity indicators, exemplify this notion. Out of twenty various species, each has ecological and behavioral requirements that can be found in both opened and closed canopy gaps. Males will claim certain gaps as their territory to protect the patch from other males, in hopes to attract their female counterpart. Twelve species of butterflies had a positive phototactic response, while four species had a negative response and the remaining four did not express any sort of preference. Overall, butterfly species in a tropical rainforest were, on average, occupying open canopy gaps more frequently. Butterfly assemblage is determined by the amount of light and temperature that penetrates the canopy.

Newly created light gaps are avoided in a lot of situations by species that would normally replenish them through seed dispersal. However, the aid of the wind for seed dispersal in the light gap has a positive effect on plants, taking them further from the parent plant and decreasing predation. Frugivores such as birds and bats find recently created gaps dangerous because they pose a hazard on their overall well-being. Birds find no place to perch, and bats are more susceptible to predators when they fly in this area. Large monkeys, toucans, and guans perch in the tops of the canopy, and therefore release their seeds under the canopy and as a result, the seeds do not get dispersed where most needed. Wind initiates seed movement into the canopy gap. As the gap matures, it begins to grow trees that bear fruit, and growth of shrubs draw in more animals as they provide better protection from the open canopy above.

Overall, there are many advantages and disadvantages of a light gap disturbance. Some species benefit, and others are threatened. Through more research and investigation, scientists hope to uncover all aspects of the occurrence. It is only then that laws may be implemented to reduce harmful outcomes and increase further ecological sustainability.
