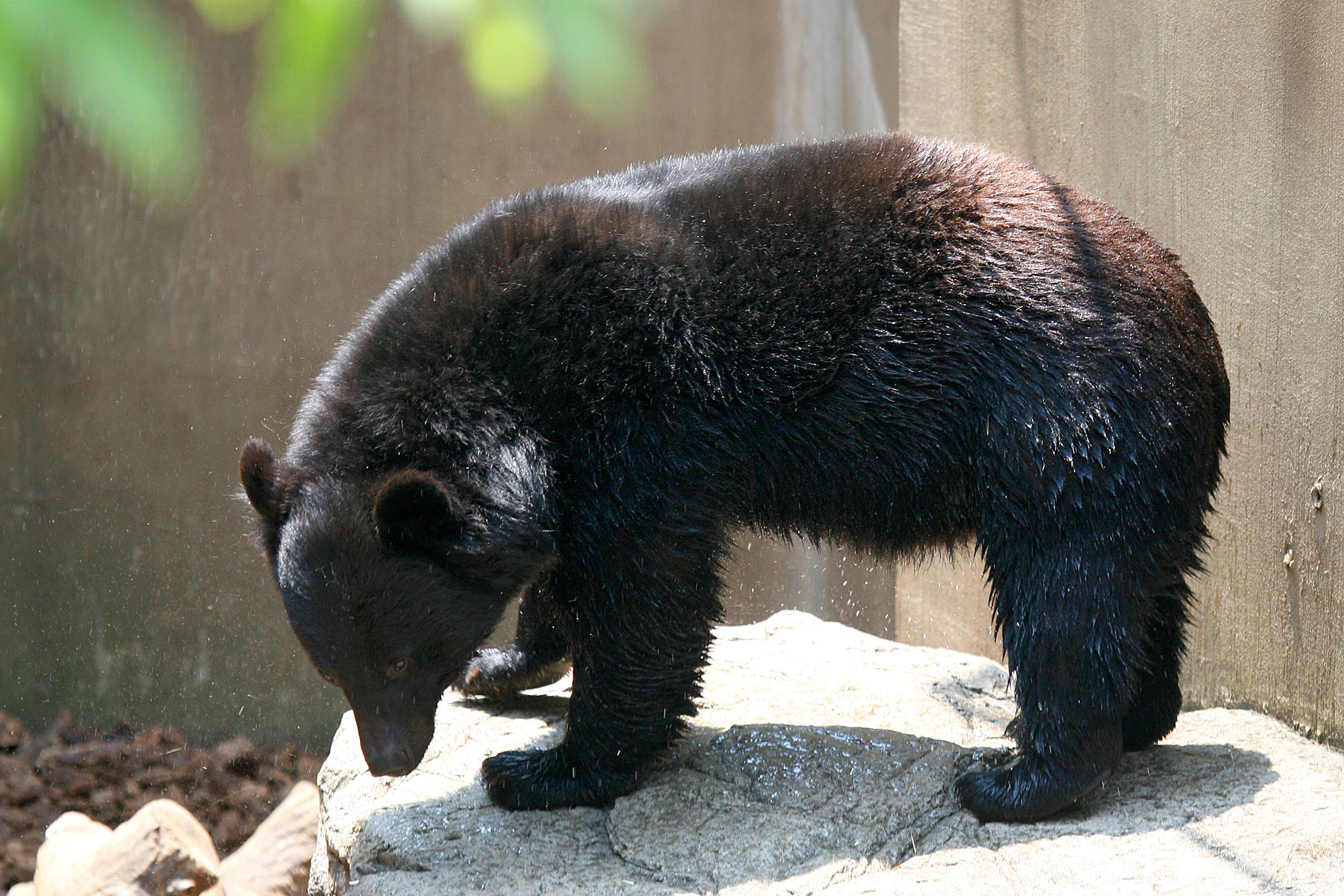

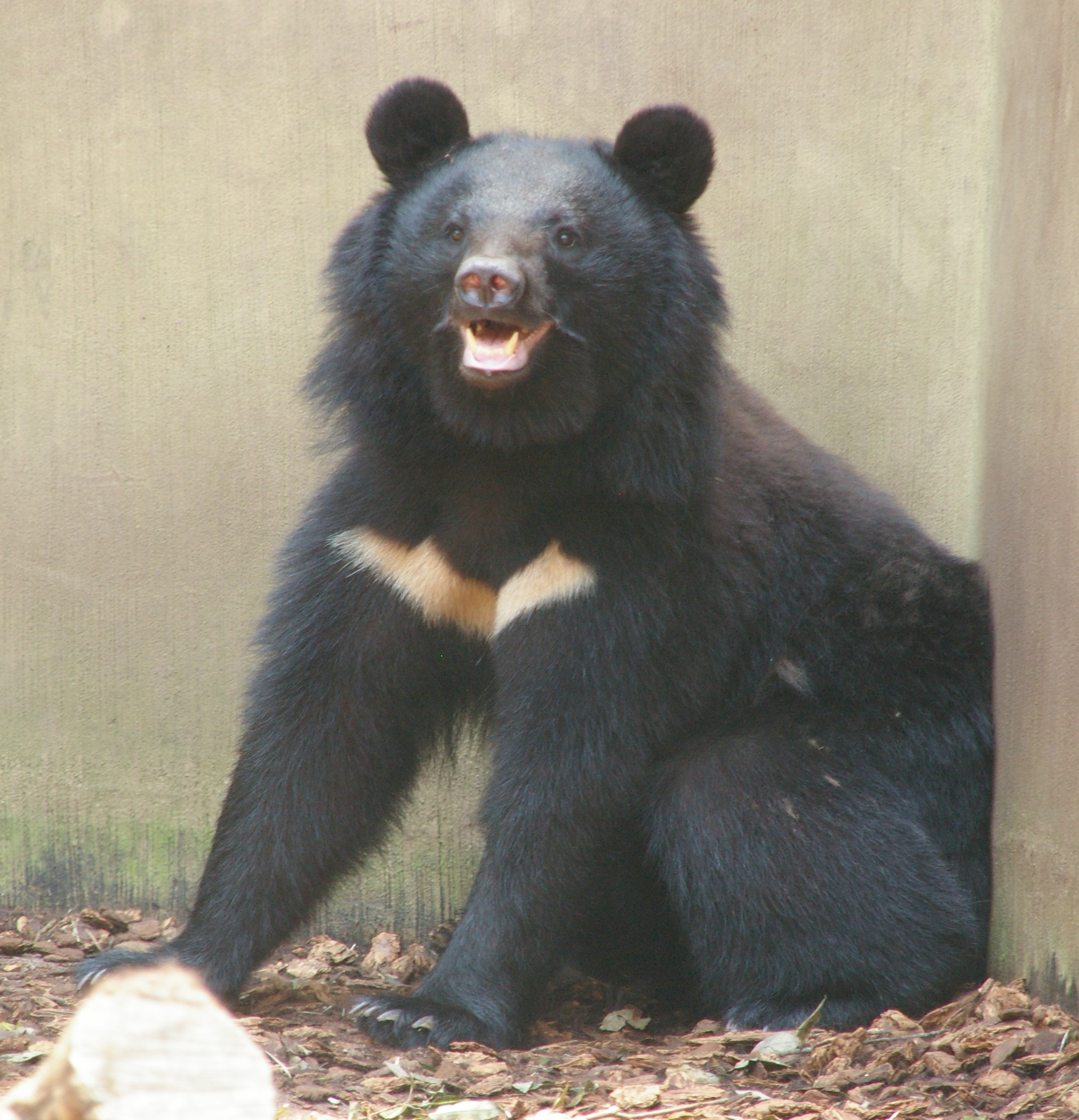
- At Ueno Zoo

Conservation status
- Vulnerable (IUCN 3.1) (Kyoto prefecture)

Scientific classification
- Kingdom: Animalia
- Phylum: Chordata
- Class: Mammalia
- Order: Carnivora
- Family: Ursidae
- Genus: Ursus
- Species: U. thibetanus
- Subspecies: U. t. japonicus

Trinomial name
- Ursus thibetanus japonicus Schlegel, 1857

Synonyms
- Selenarctos thibetanus japonicus

= Japanese black bear =

Subspecies of carnivore

The Japanese black bear (Ursus thibetanus japonicus) is a subspecies of the Asian black bear that lives on two main islands of Japan: Honshu and Shikoku.

Honshu's bear population is growing, with one recent estimate putting the number of black bears at 44,000 – compared with 15,000 estimated in 2012. The population of black bears on Shikoku is endangered at less than 30 individuals, while the last confirmed sighting of a bear on the island of Kyushu was in 1987, making them likely extinct on the island prior to the 21st century.

The Japanese black bear is a smaller subspecies of the Asian black bear, with males only reaching 60–120 kilograms (130–260 lb) and females only weighing about 40–100 kilograms (88–220 lb). Their body length is about 120–140 centimetres (47–55 in) long.

The Japanese black bear migrated from the Asian continent to the Japanese archipelago in the Pleistocene, where it appears to have differentiated into several geographically restricted groups, around 100,000 to 500,000 years ago. However, based on mitochondrial DNA analysis, Kishida et al. (2022) suggested these differences only became pronounced genetically around 30,000 years ago.

== Diet ==
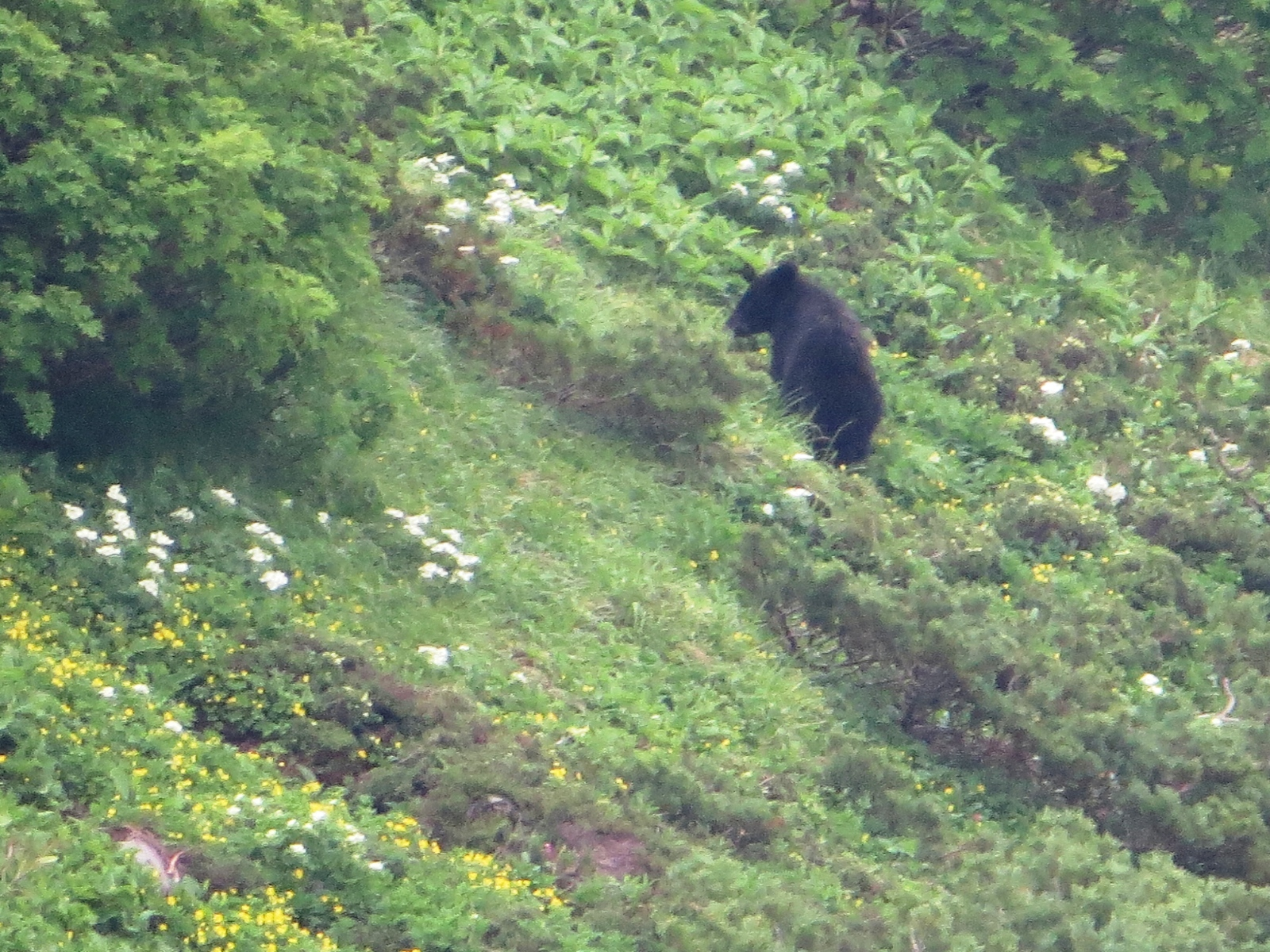
Bear eating plants in the area of Mount Norikura

These bears eat mainly grasses and herbs during the spring. During the summer, they switch to berries and nuts to feed themselves for their hibernation. The bear is able to get the berries and nuts by climbing trees and using their claws to grab the food. These animals can be omnivorous and eat other wild animals and livestock when there is a need. Typical prey species include Japanese serow.

Japanese beech mast (seeds) are one of the staple foods for the Japanese black bear, particularly in eastern Japan. The beech mast is produced every few years by the trees, which are widespread throughout Japan as far north as the Oshima Peninsula. Bears also feed on the young leaves, buds, and reproductive organs of the beech trees; the beech tree is the single most valuable food source for bears in areas where beech forests are found.

== Habitat ==
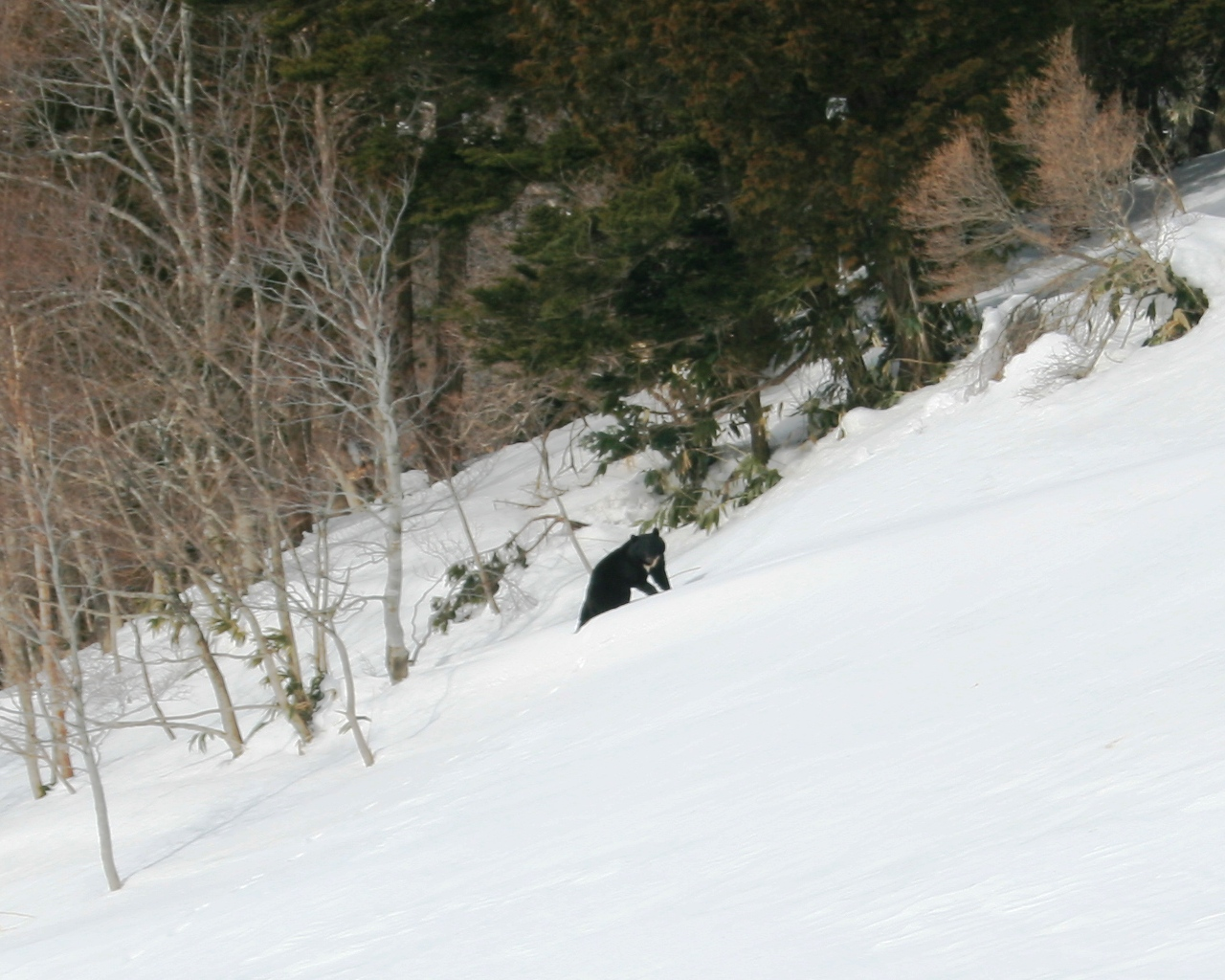
In the area of Mount Kurai

The bears live on two Japanese islands: Honshu and Shikoku. They can be found in the northeastern high snow region and the southwestern low snow region; however, they have been spotted as high as the alpine region more than 3,000 metres (9,800 feet) high. They tend to live in areas where there is an abundance of grasses and trees with berries to support their diet, particularly broad-leaved, deciduous forests.

=== Population isolation ===
Due to the mountainous nature of Japan, bears are often geographically isolated from each other. In Iwate Prefecture, which has a large population of black bears, the population has been divided into two distinct groups: those in the Ōu Mountains and those in the Kitakami Mountains.

== Seed dispersal ==
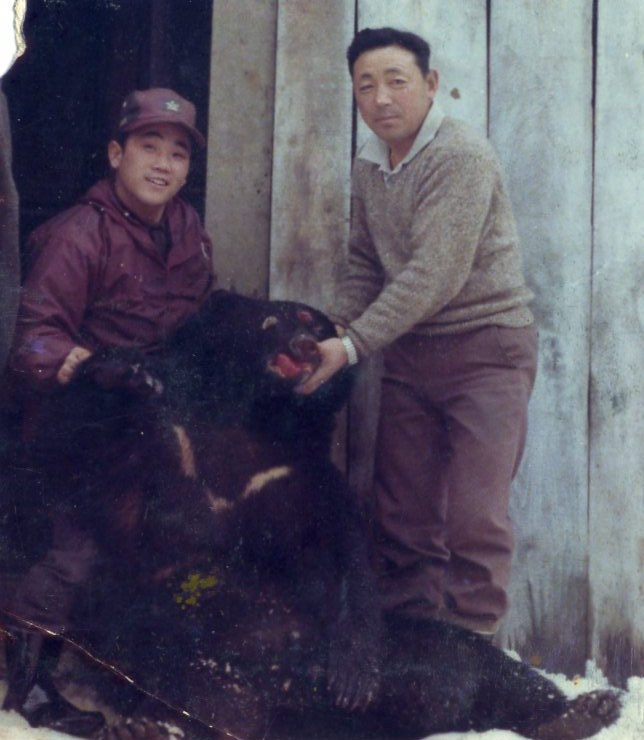
Matagi hunters with bear, Kamikoani, Akita, 1966

Forests rely on bears as a great method for plants and trees to spread their seeds. The bears will consume the seeds and move 40% farther than a distance of 500 m from the parent tree. They have the potential to spread seeds over huge areas, helping the plant life spread throughout the area. In autumn, the bears have a greater seed dispersal rate and usually the males have a larger dispersal areas than females.

== Conservation ==
=== Interactions with humans ===
Due to both the expansion of the distribution of bears and human encroachment into bear habitat, contact between bears and humans has increased. In addition to the damage to the bear population caused by habitat destruction, these interactions increase the risk of humans exposure to zoonotic diseases, such as filarial infections, babesiosis, and trichinosis. The appearance of black bears around both suburban and rural residential areas is associated with the failure of hard mast seed production from Japanese beech or mizunara oak trees; in the face of food shortages, bears extend their foraging ranges. Standing Japanese persimmon or chestnuts orchards may attract bears to residential areas.

=== 20th century ===
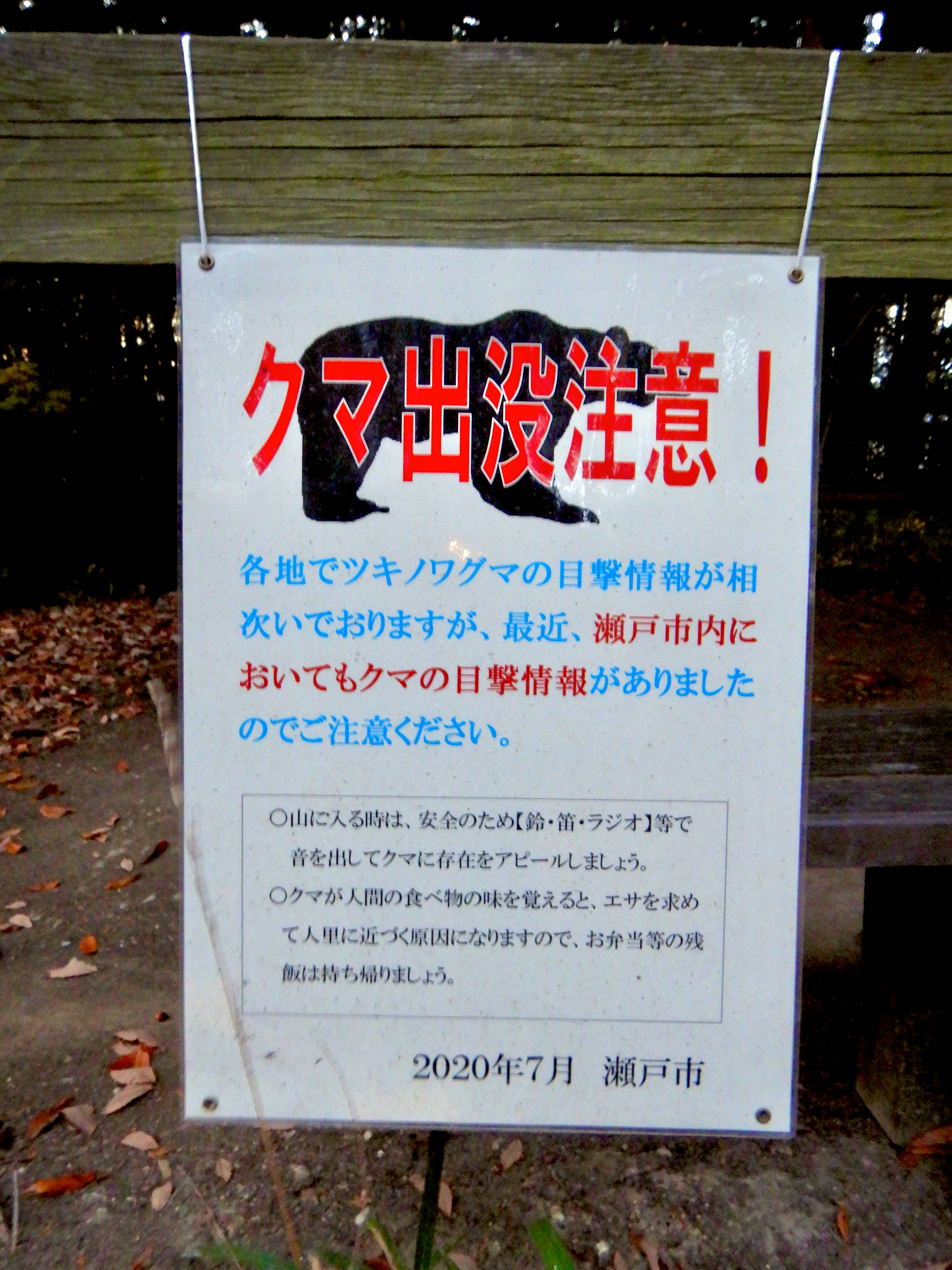
Bear warning sign at Seto, Aichi

There had been a significant impact on Japanese black bear populations due to human interference. Habitat destruction had posed a problem for these bears as human settlements expanded. Over-hunting and poaching had also been issues. Bears' parts could be sold on the black market for high prices, making them highly sought after. Large numbers of bears had been killed, drastically reducing their population. As a result, along with the reduced carrying capacity caused by habitat loss, the Japanese black bear had been recognized as being at high risk of extinction. At the rates of decline observed at the time, the subspecies was projected to possibly disappear within the following 100 years.

=== Since 2000 ===
In Japan, it had long been customary to cull large numbers of Japanese black bears in spring in order to prevent bark-stripping in plantation forests of Japanese cedar and cypress, and the population declined sharply by the 1980s. Following voluntary restrictions and local bans on bear hunting introduced in western Japan in the late 1980s, similar measures were adopted elsewhere, leading to a nationwide decrease in hunting pressure. In 2000, the Ministry of the Environment formulated a management manual aimed at restoring populations of both the Japanese black bear and the brown bear, establishing explicit upper limits on annual capture rates; this manual has since undergone several revisions. As a result of these conservation measures, the Japanese black bear population began to recover. Between 2012 and 2023 alone, the population tripled, reaching approximately 44,000 individuals. Consequently, bear intrusions into human settlements increased markedly, and when combined with brown bear incidents in Hokkaidō, the number of people killed or injured by bears reached an unprecedented 218 in 2023.

In 2024, the Ministry of the Environment announced a shift from a conservation-focused approach to a population control management policy that relies on regulated hunting.

In late 2025, Japanese black bears were appearing in settled areas with even greater frequency, and bear attack fatalities reached a record high, with Iwate and Akita Prefectures reporting particularly large numbers of casualties. The rapid increase in bear populations and their growing presence near human settlements have been attributed not only to the earlier shift toward conservation policies, but also to declining and aging rural populations, which led to the depopulation of mountain villages and reduced number of available hunters, causing bears to become less wary of humans and expand their range into inhabited areas. Additionally, a severe failure of acorn yield in 2025 drove bears to enter settlements in foraging of food in preparation for hibernation. To address the shortage of hunters, the government deployed Self-Defense Forces personnel to provide logistical support, such as assisting with the installation of box traps, and granted police officers the authority to discharge firearms and kill bears when necessary. In fiscal year 2025, there were 232 casualties caused by the Japanese black bear, including 11 fatalities, marking a record high. By contrast, the larger and potentially more dangerous brown bear was responsible for six casualties, including two fatalities. The increase in urban bears may be linked to a decline in Japan's rural population. Bears become accustomed to seemingly abandoned human settlements and satoyama, and thus often stray slightly further into populated towns and cities.

== See also ==
- Ussuri brown bear

== Bibliography ==
- Hazumi, Toshihiro (1994). "Status of Japanese black bear". Bears: Their Biology and Management. Vol. 9. International Association for Bear Research and Management. pp. 145–148. doi:10.2307/3872694. JSTOR 3872694.
- Horino, S.; Miura, S. (2000). "Population viability analysis of a Japanese black bear population". Population Ecology. 42 (1): 37–44. Bibcode:2000PopEc..42...37H. doi:10.1007/s101440050007. S2CID 38285591.
- Koike, Shinsuke; Masaki, Takashi; Nemoto, Yui; Kozakai, Chinatsu; Yamazaki, Koji; Kasai, Shinsuke; Nakajima, Ami; Kaji, Koichi (2011). "Estimate of the seed shadow created by the Asiatic black bear Ursus thibetanus and its characteristics as a seed disperser in Japanese cool-temperate forest". Oikos. 120 (2): 280–290. Bibcode:2011Oikos.120..280K. doi:10.1111/j.1600-0706.2010.18626.x.
- Shigeru Azuma; Harumi Torii (February 1977). "A Selection of Papers from the Fourth International Conference on Bear Research and Management". Bear Biology Association Conference Series. 4. Kalispell, Montana, the USA: 71–79.
