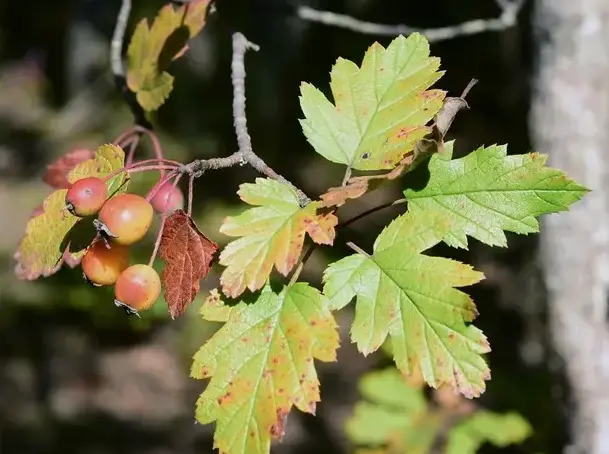

Conservation status
- Data Deficient (IUCN 3.1)

Scientific classification
- Kingdom: Plantae
- Clade: Tracheophytes
- Clade: Angiosperms
- Clade: Eudicots
- Clade: Rosids
- Order: Rosales
- Family: Rosaceae
- Genus: Malus
- Species: M. florentina

Binomial name
- Malus florentina (Zuccagni) C.K.Schneid.

Synonyms
- 18 synonyms: Cormus florentina (Zuccagni) Decne. (1874); Crataegus florentina Zuccagni (1806); Crataegus trilobata Labill. (1812); Eriolobus florentinus (Zuccagni) Stapf (1933); Eriolobus trilobatus var. oxyloba (Boiss.) C.K.Schneid. (1906); Eriolobus trilobatus var. sorgerae Browicz (1976); × Malosorbus florentina (Zuccagni) Browicz (1970); Malus crataegifolia (Targ.Tozz. ex Savi) Koehne (1890); Malus trilobata var. oxyloba (Boiss.) C.K.Schneid. (1906); Mespilus florentina (Zuccagni) Bertol. (1817); Pyrus crataegifolia Targ.Tozz. ex Savi (1811); Pyrus florentina (Zuccagni) Targ.Tozz. (1829); Pyrus trilobata var. rumelica Dingler (1883); Sorbus crataegifolia Wenz. (1883); Sorbus florentina (Zuccagni) K.Koch (1853); Sorbus trilobata var. oxyloba Boiss. (1872); × Tormimalus florentina (Zuccagni) Holub (1998); Torminaria florentina (Zuccagni) M.Roem. (1847)

= Malus florentina =

Species of plant

Malus florentina, the Florentine crabapple, Italian crabapple, or hawthorn-leaf crabapple, is a species of apple (Malus) in the rose family (Rosaceae). It was first described in 1806 as Crataegus florentina, however, the species' taxonomy was unclear for decades, and it was at times considered to be a natural hybrid between the wild service tree (Aria torminalis) and the European wild apple (M. sylvestris). Today, its inclusion in Malus is largely undisputed. It is a small deciduous tree with dark-green leaves, characterised by large, white flowers, small fruit, and a late flowering season in early summer. It is native to Italy, the southern Balkan Peninsula and a limited area in northern Anatolia, but is occasionally grown elsewhere as an ornamental tree. The fruit is edible and can be eaten raw or cooked. M. florentina is comparably rare, but its overall population structure and conservation status are unknown.

== Taxonomy and etymology ==
=== Taxonomic history ===
Malus florentina was initially described in 1806 as a species of hawthorn, Crataegus florentina, by the Florentine botanist Attilio Zuccagni (1754–1807), based on a specimen collected on Monte Cuccioli near Florence, Italy. Its first valid publication under the currently accepted name Malus florentina was 100 years later, by the German botanist Camillo Karl Schneider, in his 1906 book Illustriertes Handbuch der Laubholzkunde. In total, the species has been classified in as many as eight different genera, (Note: Namely Cormus, as Cormus florentina (Zuccagni) Decne., Eriolobus, as Eriolobus florentinus (Zuccagni) Stapf, Mespilus, as Mespilus florentina (Zuccagni) Bertol., Pyrus, as Pyrus florentina (Zuccagni) Targ.Tozz., Sorbus, as Sorbus florentina (Zuccagni) K.Koch, and Torminaria, as Torminaria florentina (Zuccagni) M.Roem.) while some authors also treated it as a subspecies of the closely related Lebanese wild apple (M. trilobata). Additionally, the species was at times considered to have originated from an ancient hybridisation between the wild service tree (Aria torminalis, formerly Sorbus torminalis) and the European wild apple (M. sylvestris), a view that was still widely accepted in the early 2000s. Prominently, the Polish dendrologist Kazimierz Browicz held this view, and in 1970 classified the species in the nothogenus × Malosorbus, as × Malosorbus florentina (Zuccagni) Browicz. While he emphasised the species' lobed leaves, this characteristic is also present in some North American and East Asian Malus species, prompting Sutton and Dunn (2021) to remark: "It is tempting to speculate that this suggestion would never have been made if the tree were native to Sichuan rather than southern Europe."

=== Modern taxonomy and evolution ===
Since then, studies have firmly placed the species within the apple genus, Malus. In particular, a 2008 review by Qian and colleagues using morphological, phytochemical and molecular evidence came to the conclusion that it is a primary species of Malus, with no indication of a hybrid origin. Accordingly, as of October 2025, Plants of the World Online includes the species in Malus. Although its exact relationship to other species in the genus is yet unclear, phylogenetic studies based on plastid and nuclear DNA suggest that M. florentina is closely related to M. trilobata from the eastern Mediterranean, often placing both species together on a branch that also contains the North American species prairie crabapple (M. ioensis), southern crabapple (M. angustifolia), and sweet crabapple (M. coronaria).

A phylogenetic study by Liu and colleagues (2022) showed that this branch, called Clade II, changed position within the Maleae tribe, depending on whether the phylograms used were based on nuclear or plastid DNA. Whereas Clade II was sister to all other Malus in nuclear phylogenies, plastid phylogenies positioned it next to Pourthiaea, and thus closer to other Maleae such as Sorbus and Aronia than to Malus proper.

This discordance between nuclear and plastid phylogenies, the authors proposed, could be due to several factors during the speciation process: incomplete lineage sorting, that is, the inheritance of an incomplete set of alleles from the most recent common ancestor; allopolyploidy, that is, the inheritance of more than two copies of alleles; or hybridisation, the crossing of species. All of these were important mechanisms underlying the evolution of the Maleae, the apple tribe, rendering the reconstruction of its evolutionary history difficult. The authors proposed hybridisation as the most likely scenario, whereby the ancestor of Clade II hybridised with the ancestor of Pourthiaea, so that all its descendants, including M. florentina, inherited Pourthiaea's chloroplast DNA through a process known as chloroplast capture. On the other hand, in a 2017 study by Savelyeva and colleagues, these relationships were not supported, and two M. florentina samples did not even cluster together in one clade.

In a further 2024 study by Sun and colleagues, the authors argued for a resurection of the genus Eriolobus to contain both M. trilobata and M. florentina. This was based on a phylogenetic analysis of mitochondrial DNA, which yielded a similar phylogenetic tree to studies based on plastid DNA. However, the authors of the study incorrectly identified M. florentina as a North American species.

According to Liu and colleagues (2022), Malus originated in North America and East Asia, most likely in the middle Eocene, between 41.2 and 44.39 million years ago. Also according to this study, Clade II, the clade M. florentina belongs to, originated in western North America and subsequently spread to Europe and western Asia in the late Eocene via the North Atlantic Land Bridge. The split between M. florentina and its sister M. trilobata, the two representatives of this clade in western Eurasia, was estimated to have occurred already in the early Oligocene, 32.81 million years ago. Malus antiqua, a fossil species with lobed leaves from the Pliocene (5.33–2.58 Mya) of Europe, recovered in Romania, is thought to be ancestral to M. florentina or M. trilobata.

Traditionally, M. florentina has been included in the section Sorbomalus, alongside a number of other species with lobed leaves, including M. sieboldii, M. transitoria, M. kansuensis and M. fusca, but the monophyly of this section is not supported by phylogenetic analyses. Alternatively, Qian and colleagues (2008) proposed a classification as the only species in the section Florentinae. However, in a comprehensive 2022 revision of the genus Malus, Li and colleagues argued against the use of these traditional morphological groupings, due to their generally poor conformity with relationships established through phylogenetic studies.

=== Etymology ===
Both the botanical and the common name Florentine crabapple refer to the municipality of Florence, Italy, which lies within the species' natural distribution and has a major history of botanical collection in its famous Renaissance gardens. The other common name hawthorn-leaf refers to its distinct toothed leaf shape, which resembles that of a hawthorn (Crataegus).

== Description ==
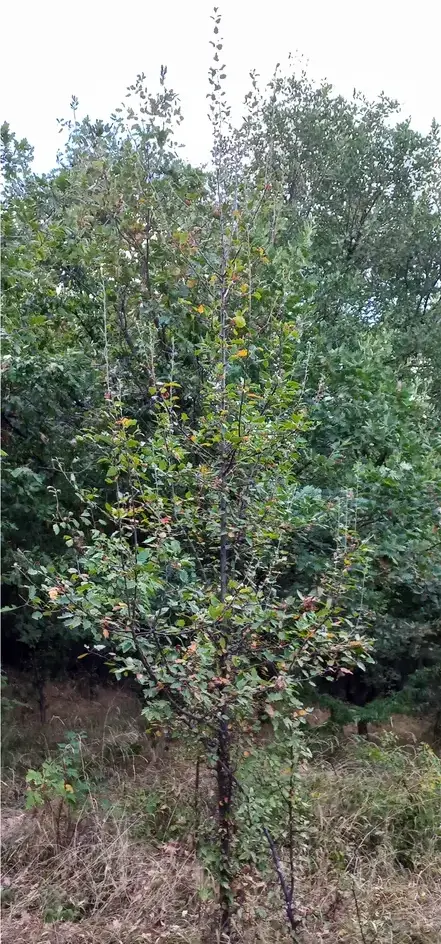
Young M. florentina tree

Malus florentina is a small deciduous, upright and initially vase shaped or conical, but later rounded tree, growing up to 9 by 6 metres (30 by 20 feet) tall and wide. It may, however, also stay shrubby. A large tree recorded in the Ibar valley in Kosovo in 2001 was estimated to be over 7 metres (23 ft) tall and 80–90 years old, with a trunk girth closely approaching 90 centimetres (35 in). The leaves are hawthorn-like and serrated, with 3–5 lobes on each side, and positioned on downy leaf stalks 0.5–2 centimetres (0.2–0.8 in) long. They are dark green, hairy above at first in spring but becoming virtually smooth above, grey-white and densely hairy below, 2–8 centimetres (0.8–3.1 in) long and 3–4 centimetres (1.2–1.6 in) wide, and resemble wild service tree (Aria torminalis) leaves. The branches are initially densely hairy when young, becoming smooth later, and are thornless.

The white flowers are 1.5–2 centimetres (0.6–0.8 in) in diameter, growing in loose clusters of between 2 and 7, and the tree blooms in early summer. The species is monoecious, having hermaphrodite flowers. The fruit grow on long fruit stalks around 3 centimetres (1.2 in) in length. They are small, around 1–1.2 centimetres (0.4–0.5 in) long, and round, becoming dull to bright red when ripe from October to November and do not have grit cells; the sepals are deciduous. The seeds (apple pips) contain hydrogen cyanide, so can be toxic in large doses. The bark is dark and fissured with age, but may also be light, flaky and smooth on young individuals, where it sheds in pale, shallow scales, similar to quince (Cydonia oblonga). The species is cold hardy to RHS H6 and USDA hardiness zones 4–8, and is not frost tender.

M. florentina can be differentiated from the sympatric M. sylvestris by its lobed leaves and long fruit stalks, which are usually longer than the fruit. It can further be distinguished from the closely related M. trilobata, with which it marginally overlaps in Anatolia, by its usually shorter leaf and longer fruit stalks, smaller fruit size, and different, less palmate leaves. The wild service tree has similar, but larger leaves with more strongly pointed lobes. Another species which is similar in leaf shape is the black hawthorn (Crataegus nigra), which rarely occurs in riparian forests along the Danube.

The species is diploid, with a chromosome number of 2n=34.

== Distribution and ecology ==
Malus florentina has a disjunct, relictual and patchy distribution, found on both sides of the Adriatic Sea, on the Apennine Peninsula and the Balkan Peninsula. (Note: This distribution type is referred to as amphi-adriatic, and is seen in a number of plant species of the central Mediterranean.) Additionally, it has also been reported from three widely dispersed localities in northern Anatolia, particularly from the Pontic Alps, (Note: Davis (1972) reported the populations in northern Anatolia to be sterile.) and new localities continue to be discovered in the 21st century. Its distribution bears a similarity to other woody species such as Hungarian oak (Quercus frainetto), Bosnian pine (Pinus heldreichii), and Oriental hornbeam (Carpinus orientalis). Following its initial description in 1806, M. florentina was only known to occur on the Apennine Peninsula, until further botanical exploration revealed its occurrence in Anatolia and the Balkans in 1889 and 1918, respectively. Thus, although it is not endemic to the Apennine Peninsula, it was at times falsely believed to be so.

While some authors suggest that M. florentina is common in northern Italy and North Macedonia, researchers generally agree that it is a comparably rare, and probably overall declining species. Throughout its range, the species occurs as a scattered component of temperate and submediterranean oak woodlands and scrub, preferring moist soil. Like its close relative, M. trilobata, M. florentina is often considered a tertiary remnant of a formerly more species-rich genus Malus in Europe.

In Italy, the species is primarily found in the northern central and southern central parts, including in Emilia-Romagna, Tuscany, Umbria, Marche, Campania, and Basilicata, and is absent from the north. Here, it is a species of warm-temperate (thermophilic) deciduous oak woodlands, and a characteristic species of the Teucrio Siculi-Quercion cerridis vegetation alliance within the Quercetalia pubescenti-petraeae order, which occupies slopes at medium elevations or ravines and valleys at lower elevations that are characterised by a cool climate with frost periods and substantial rainfall. These woodlands are dominated by Turkey oak (Quercus cerris), along with other oaks (Hungarian oak Q. frainetto, sessile oak Q. petraea, and downy oak Q. pubescens), maples (Montpelier maple Acer monspessulanum, Italian maple A. opalus subsp. obtusatum, and field maple A. campestre), European hornbeam (Carpinus betulus), wild service tree (Aria torminalis) and, more rarely, European hop-hornbeam (Ostrya carpinifolia). Other typical species include tree heather (Erica arborea), green heather (Erica scoparia), evergreen rose (Rosa sempervirens), Etruscan honeysuckle (Lonicera etrusca), bramble (Rubus hirtus), midland hawthorn (Crataegus laevigata), globe thistle (Echinops siculus), white violet (Viola alba subsp. dehnhardtii), wild madder (Rubia peregrina), false broom (Brachypodium sylvaticum), wood spurge (Euphorbia amygdaloides), wood melick (Melica uniflora), slender wood violet (Viola reichenbachiana), and spurge-laurel (Daphne laureola).

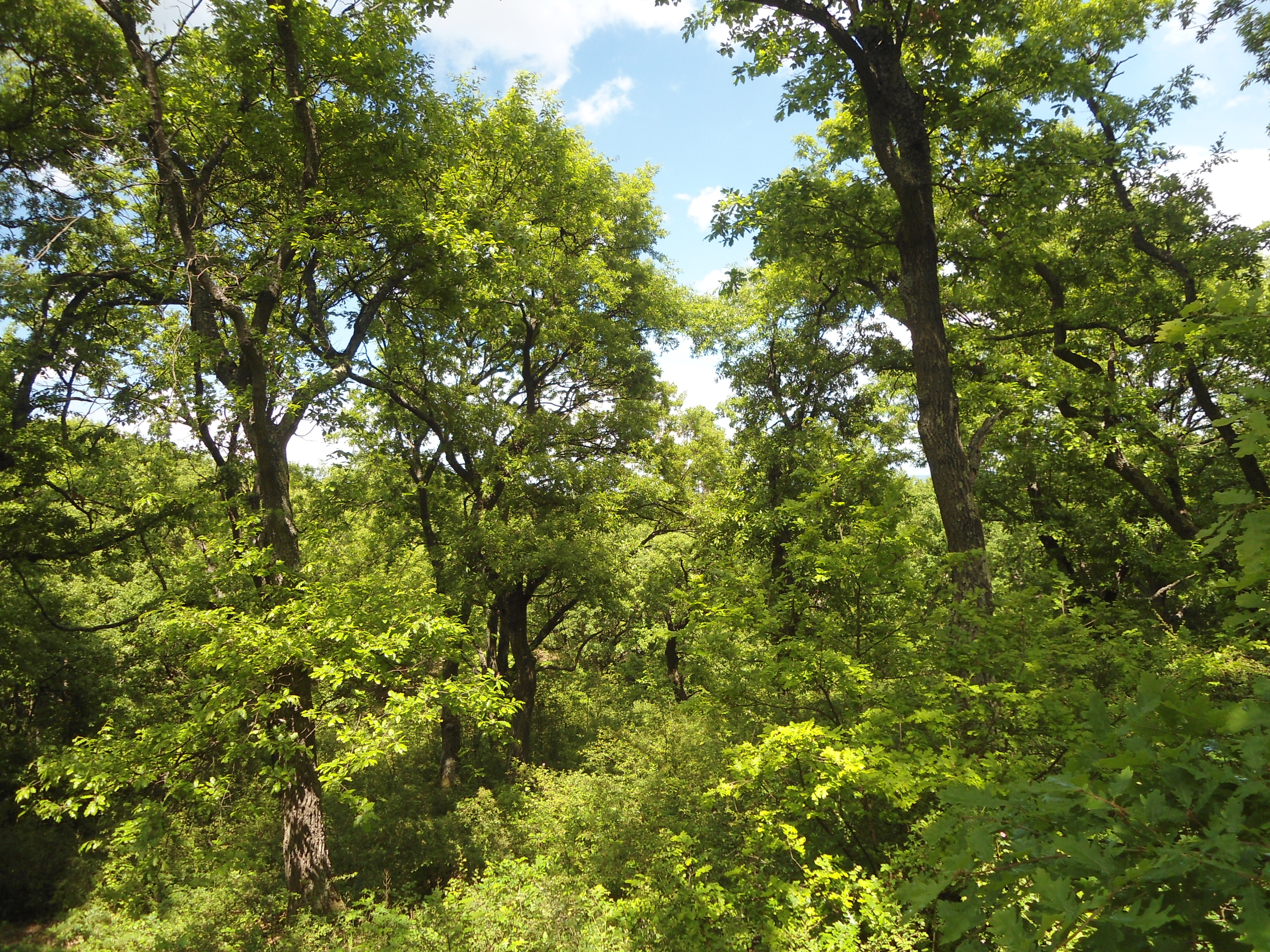
A mixed oak forest in Bulgaria. Throughout its range, M. florentina occurs mainly around the edges of thermophilic oak forests.

In the Balkans, M. florentina is distributed primarily in the southern central part, particularly in North Macedonia, eastern Albania, Kosovo, southern Serbia, and northern Greece, however, isolated populations have also been recorded in central and southern Greece, western Albania, western Bulgaria, and east Thrace. It occurs mainly in thermophilic deciduous oak woodlands within the Quercetalia pubescentis and Quercetalia roburi-petraeae vegetation alliances in hilly terrain, however, in Albania it has also been observed in Austrian pine (Pinus nigra subsp. nigra) forests and in scrubland at altitudes of up to 1475 m. In Kosovo and southern Serbia, the species is a member of forest communities along the Ibar river dominated by Turkey oak and Hungarian oak, alongside wild service tree, Oriental hornbeam (Carpinus orientalis), pears (European wild pear Pyrus communis subsp. pyraster and almond-leaved pear P. spinosa), junipers (eastern prickly juniper Juniperus deltoides and common juniper J. communis), Tatar maple (Acer tataricum), dog rose (Rosa canina), European smoketree (Cotinus coggygria), hellebore (Helleborus odorus), milkvetch (Astragalus glycyphyllos), bladderseed (Physospermum cornubiense), owl-head clover (Trifolium alpestre), and black pea (Lathyrus niger). In Bulgaria, the species is found in the Vlahina Mountains and the Struma river valley at 500–900 metres (1,600–3,000 ft) altitude in mixed forest communities consisting of downy oak (Quercus pubescens), European hop-hornbeam, Oriental hornbeam, manna ash (Fraxinus ornus), field elm (Ulmus minor), and St Lucie cherry (Prunus mahaleb), along with a number of smaller trees and shrubs.

The species' pollination mechanism is not known, but other Malus are pollinated by insects, especially bees. The species bears small, red fruit, and is reported to be dispersed by birds. Like other Malus species, it appears to follow a biennial fruiting pattern, bearing large crops only every other year. M. florentina, like other rosaceous fruit trees, is light-demanding, requiring an open canopy to thrive. Canopy closure leads to the reduction or absence of flowers and fruit, and may lead to the absence of regeneration and the loss of trees. For example, in the former coppice woodlands surrounding Chiaravalle Abbey, Fiastra, Marche, now part of a protected area, the species is thought to have been aided by traditional management, but is now strictly limited to local canopy openings along pathways, forest edges and gaps. A 2025 study by Papp and colleagues identified four genes under strong selection, which could be linked to resistance against drought and salt stress, potentially indicating an ongoing adaptation to aridification.

== Gallery ==
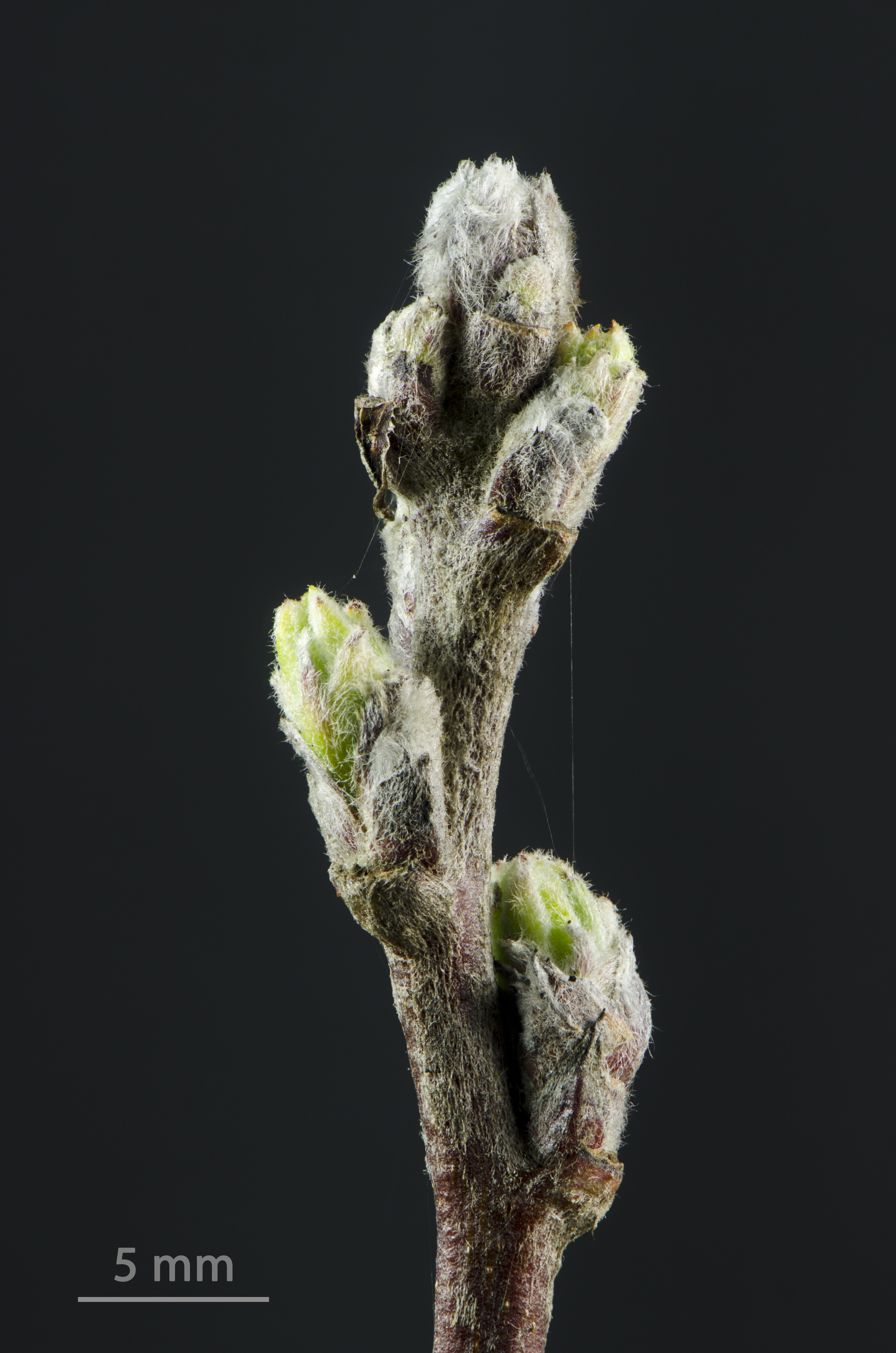
M. florentina buds in March

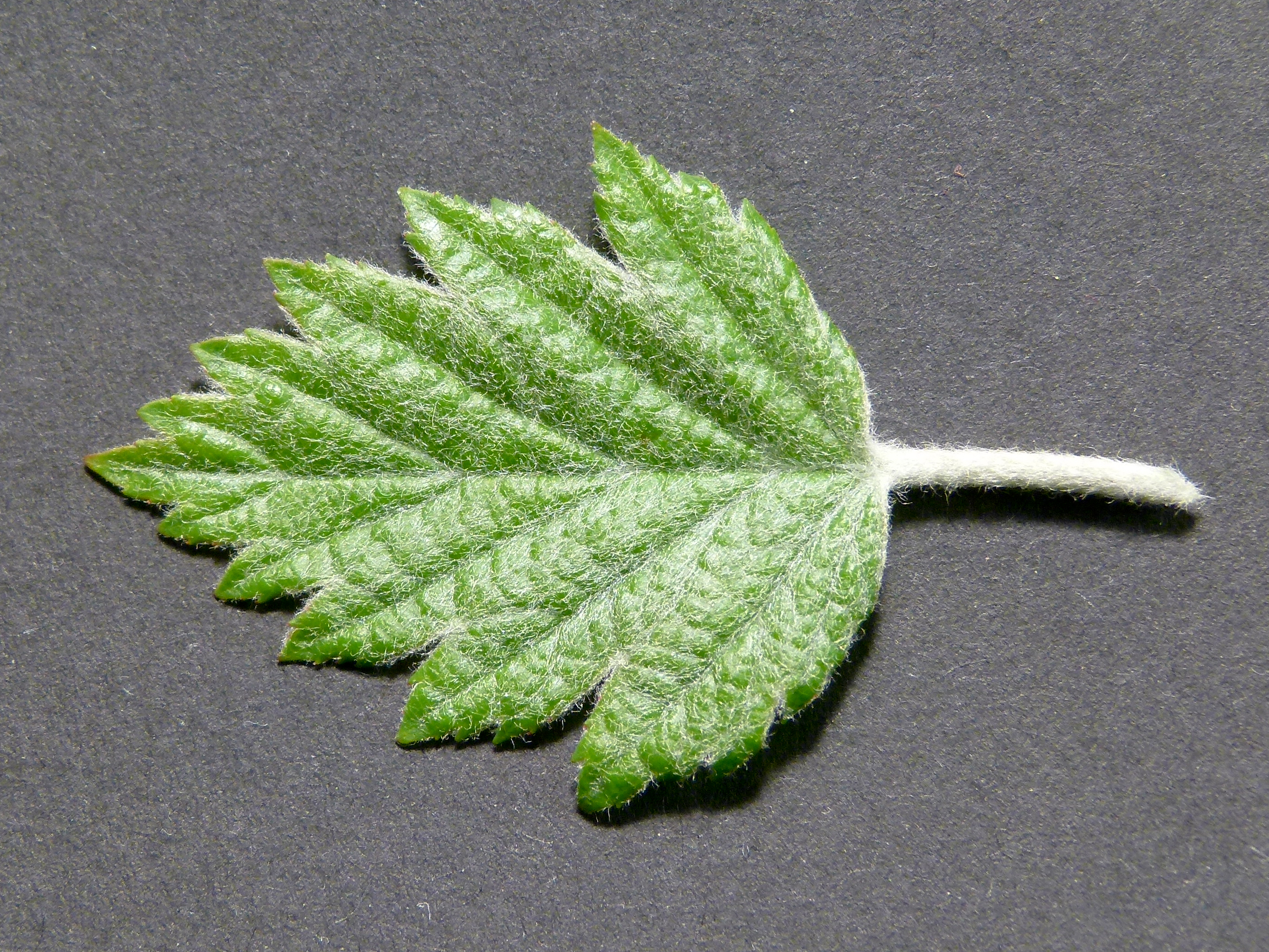
M. florentina leaf in April

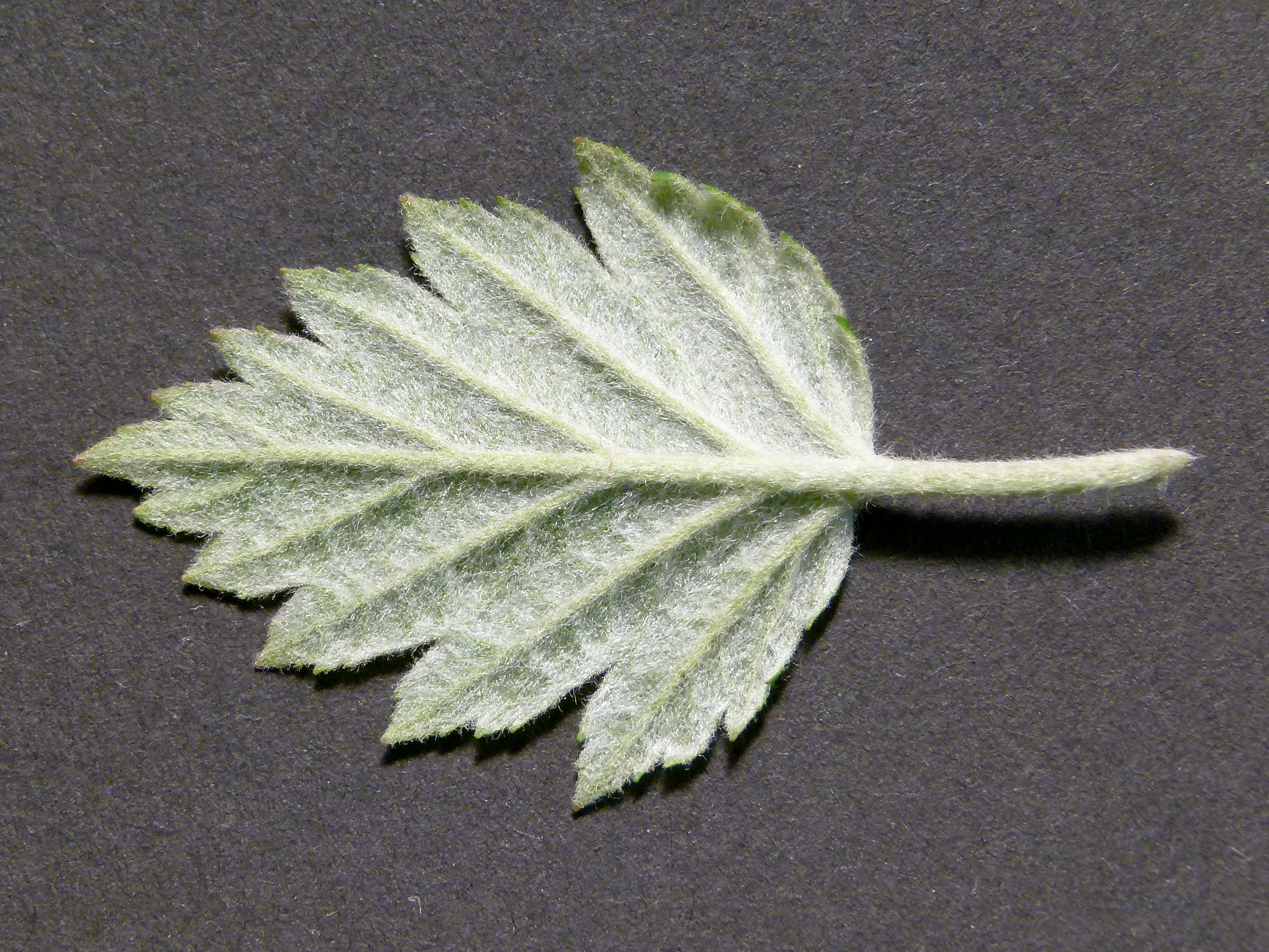
M. florentina leaf underside in April

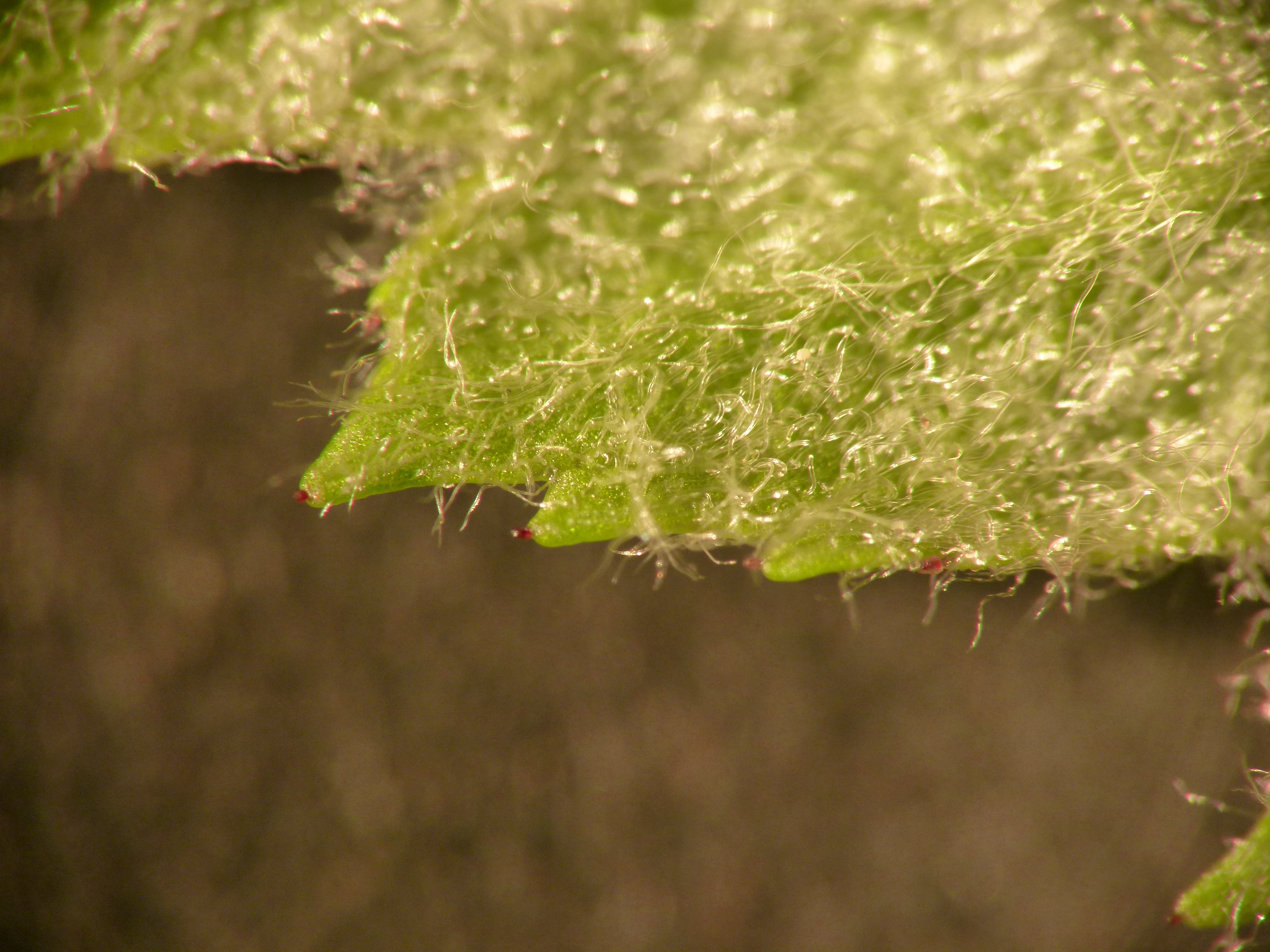
Microscopic photograph of a M. florentina leaf, detailing its hairs.

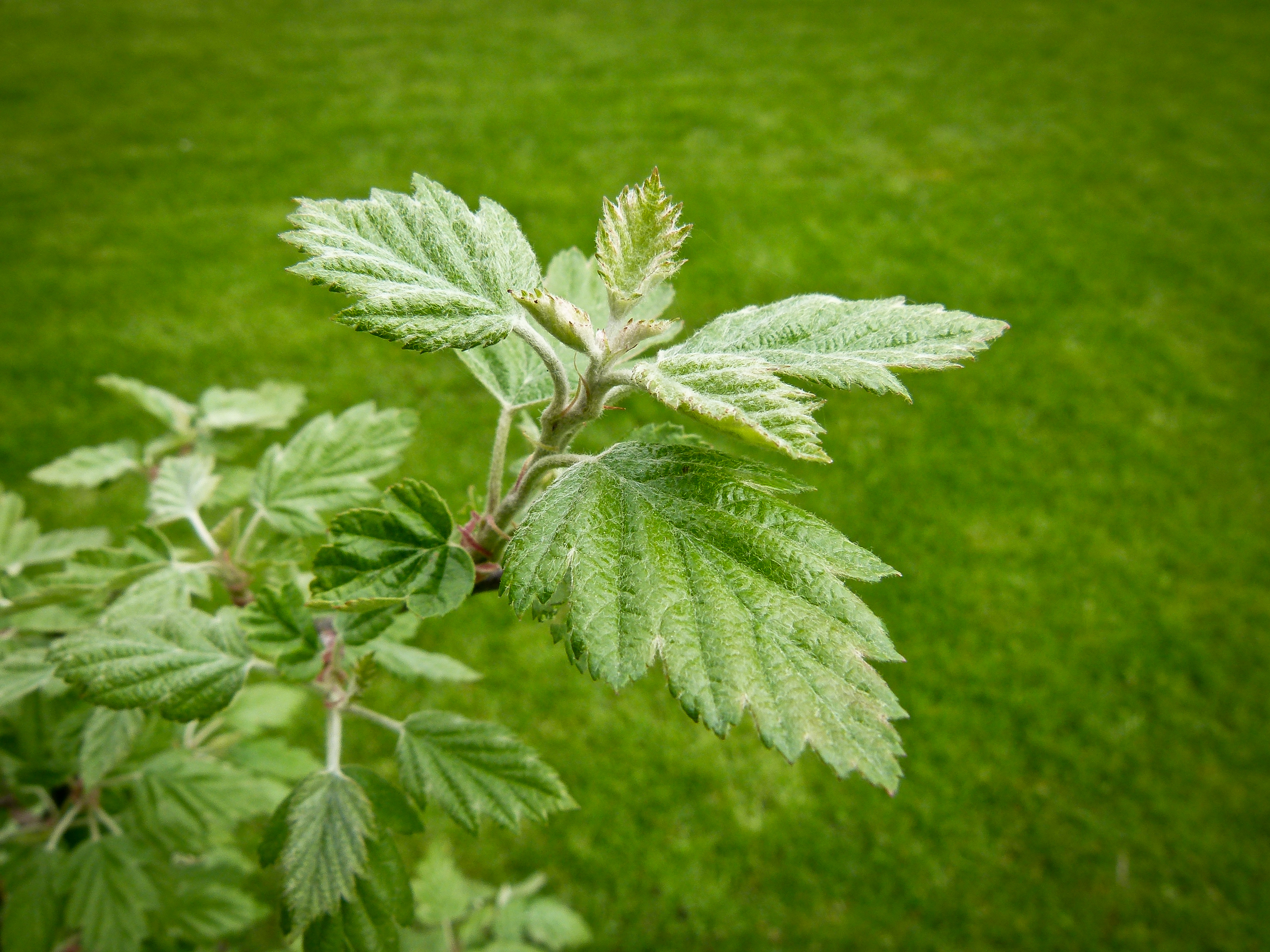
Young M. florentina growth in April

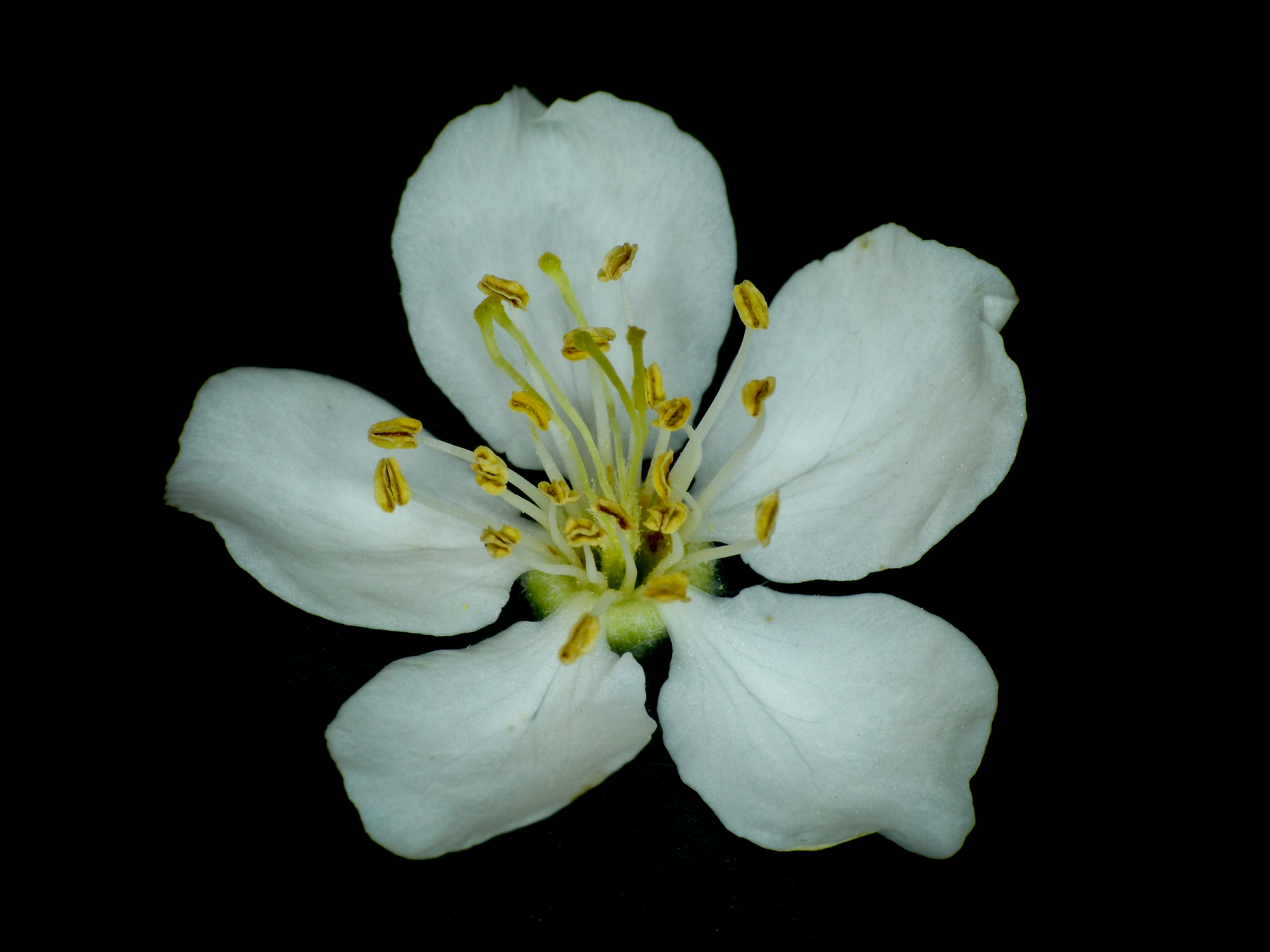
M. florentina blossom

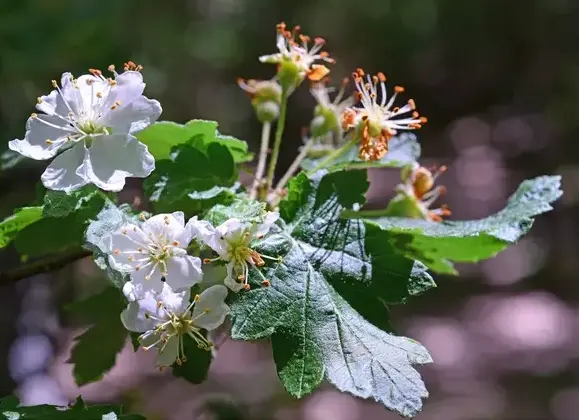
M. florentina flowers and developing fruits

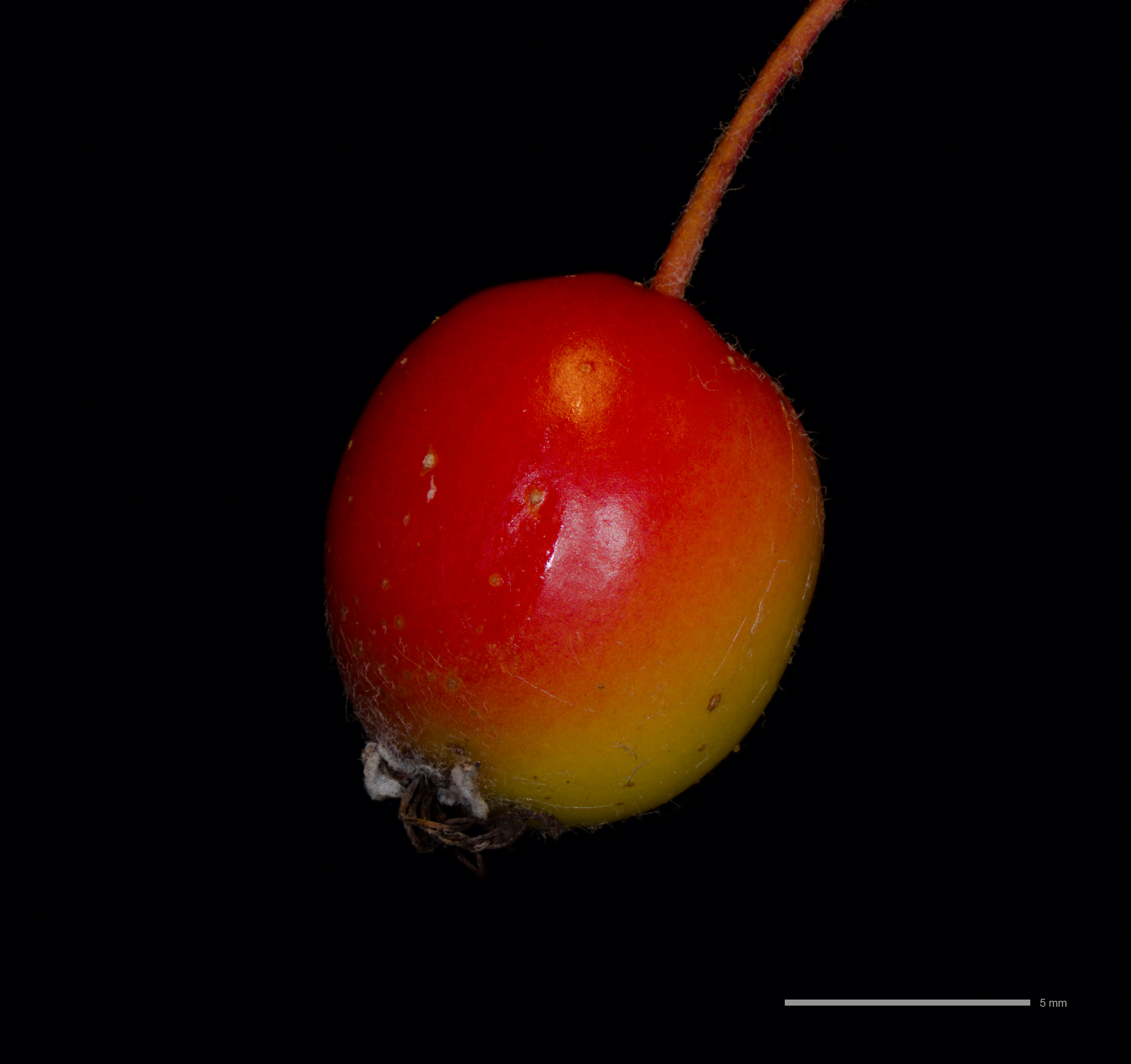
M. florentina fruit

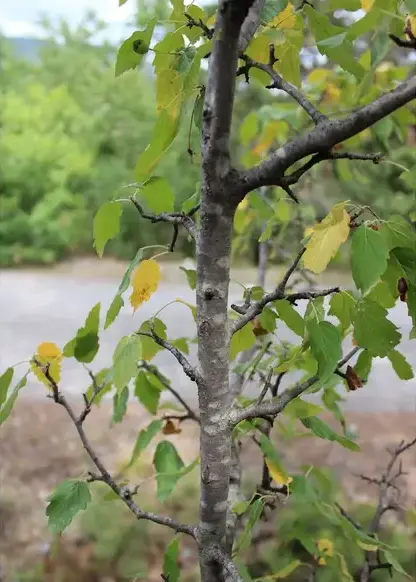
M. florentina bark on a young tree

== Status and conservation ==
Malus florentina is generally considered to be a rare species, however, since its overall population trend is insufficiently known, it was most recently (2017) assessed as data deficient (DD). Local evidence, however, suggests that the species is declining. For example, it appears to be in regression in Marche, Italy, where some populations have recently disappeared as a result of canopy closure. Additionally, a 2025 study of its genetic diversity and population structure identified a large, though expected genetic difference between populations from Italy and the Balkans, along with a lesser but still pronounced genetic differentiation between populations from different Balkan countries. This, the authors warned, could indicate a high risk of inbreeding within and genetic isolation between populations, and could point towards the species being threatened. Therefore, the authors advocated for increased conservation efforts for the species, both in situ and ex situ, and for the species' inclusion in further germplasm collections. The species can be propagated using microcuttings.

== Uses ==
The fruit of the species can be eaten raw or cooked. When bletted, it has a mealy texture with a soft acidic flesh, and is refreshing in small quantities. Although the species has been noted for its ornamental value, including its relatively late, attractive bloom, its autumn colour, and its bark, it is only rarely cultivated. Nonetheless, M. florentina is hardy in temperate Europe, with specimens growing in several collections as far north as Trondheim, Norway. The species is also relatively indifferent with respect to soil and soil pH, but prefers moist or wet soil that is well drained. It also prefers a sunny position, but can also manage when semi-shaded. M. florentina is resistant to powdery mildew, but susceptible to fire blight, particularly in North America.
