= Dactylispa hirsuta =

Scientific classification
- Kingdom: Animalia
- Phylum: Arthropoda
- Class: Insecta
- Order: Coleoptera
- Suborder: Polyphaga
- Infraorder: Cucujiformia
- Family: Chrysomelidae
- Genus: Dactylispa
- Species: D. hirsuta

Binomial name
- Dactylispa hirsuta Gestro, 1908

Species of beetle

Dactylispa hirsuta is a species of beetle of the family Chrysomelidae. It is found in Angola, Congo, Eritrea, Ethiopia, Kenya, Rwanda, South Africa and Tanzania.

== Life history ==
The recorded host plants for this species are Coffea and Prunus species, as well as Malus sylvestris.
