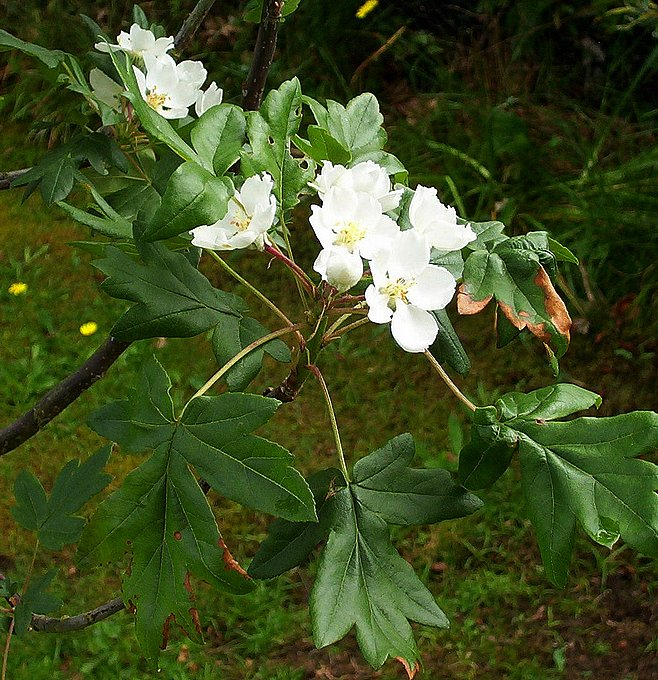
- Eriolobus trilobatus

Scientific classification
- Kingdom: Plantae
- Clade: Tracheophytes
- Clade: Angiosperms
- Clade: Eudicots
- Clade: Rosids
- Order: Rosales
- Family: Rosaceae
- Subfamily: Amygdaloideae
- Tribe: Maleae
- Subtribe: Malinae
- Genus: Eriolobus; M.Roem.

= Eriolobus =

Genus of flowering plants

Eriolobus is a former genus of plants in the family Rosaceae, native to Europe and the Middle East that is synonymized with Malus, the apples. Two species formerly included in it were Eriolobus florentinus, now Malus florentina and Eriolobus trilobatus, now Malus trilobata.
