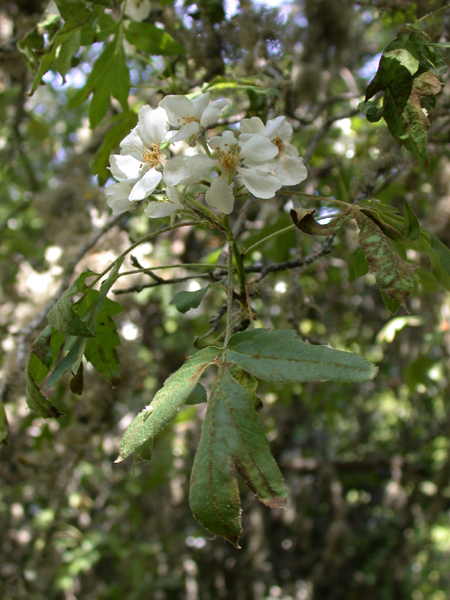

Conservation status
- Near Threatened (IUCN 3.1)

Scientific classification
- Kingdom: Plantae
- Clade: Tracheophytes
- Clade: Angiosperms
- Clade: Eudicots
- Clade: Rosids
- Order: Rosales
- Family: Rosaceae
- Genus: Malus
- Species: M. trilobata

Binomial name
- Malus trilobata (Labill. ex Poir.) C.K.Schneid.

Synonyms
- 11 synonyms: Sorbus trilobata (Labill. ex Poir.) Heynh. (1840); Crataegus trilobata Labill. ex Poir.(1810); Crataegus trilobata Labill. (1812); Eriolobus trilobatus (Labill. ex Poir.) M.Roem. (1847); Cormus trilobata (Labill. ex Poir.) Decne. (1874); Pyrus trilobata (Labill. ex Poir.) DC. (1825); Eriolobus trilobatus var. sorgerae Browicz (1976); Pyrus trilobata var. rumelica Dingler (1883); Sorbus trilobata var. oxyloba Boiss. (1872); Eriolobus trilobatus var. oxyloba (Boiss.) C.K.Schneid. (1906); Malus trilobata var. oxyloba (Boiss.) C.K.Schneid. (1906)

= Malus trilobata =

Species of plant

Malus trilobata, the Lebanese wild apple, also known as the erect crab apple, Turkish apple, three-lobed apple or deer apple, is a species of apple (Malus) in the rose family (Rosaceae). It has a discontinuous range in the eastern Mediterranean, including Thrace, coastal Anatolia and the Levant, but almost always as a rare species. First described in 1810 as Crataegus trilobata, it has a complex taxonomic history, and some authorities place it in the segregate genus Eriolobus, as Eriolobus trilobatus, either alone or together with the closely related Italian crabapple (Malus florentina) from the central Mediterranean. The species is characterised by shiny, maple-like leaves, particularly large, white flowers, large and edible fruits and a narrow growth form. Due to its attractive shape, bloom and foliage along with its drought and frost tolerance, it has found increasing interest in gardening and landscaping. Additionally, its chemical composition and associated microbiome has attracted research investigating its medical and antimicrobial properties. However, the species is thought to be threatened and declining, primarily due to human encroachment and habitat destruction, including from wildfires.

== Taxonomy and evolution ==
=== Taxonomic history ===
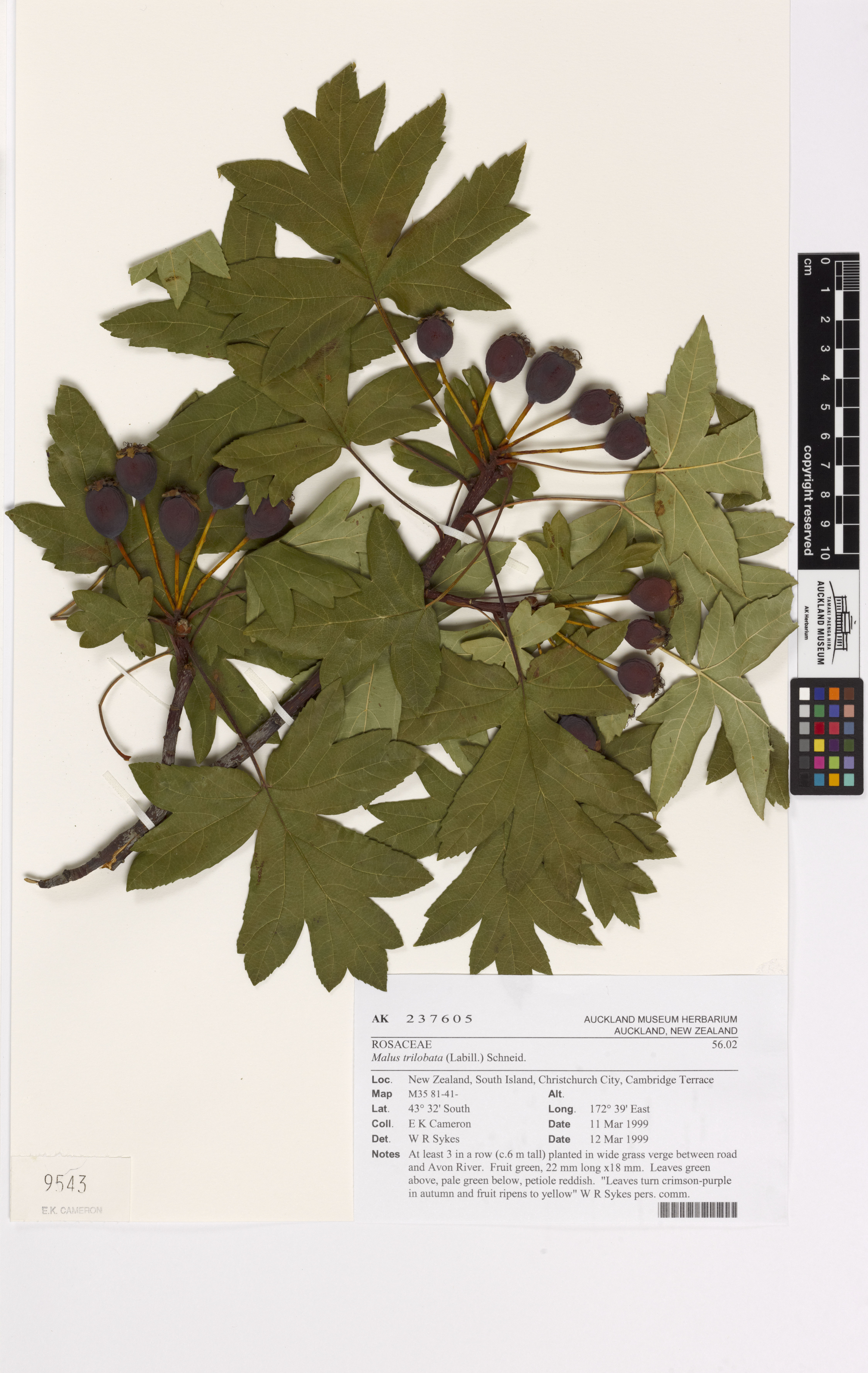
A dried branch of Malus trilobata with fruit, collected in 1999, and housed at the Auckland Museum Herbarium. Dried specimens like this serve to preserve plants, including the type of a species, that is, the original specimen that the description of a new species is based on.

The taxonomic history of Malus trilobata is complex, reflecting its unique morphology. The species was formally described by Jean Louis Marie Poiret based on a specimen, the type, that Jacques Labillardière had collected in Lebanon, in 1810. Poiret, however, considered the species to be a hawthorn, and consequently placed it in the genus Crataegus, as Crataegus trilobata. Since then, the species has also been placed within the genera Pyrus, as Pyrus trilobata, Sorbus, as Sorbus trilobata, Cormus, as Cormus trilobata, and Malus, as well as in Eriolobus, whereby the latter was variably considered to include either only M. trilobata or also M. florentina. Many authorities have sought to emphasise the species' distinctiveness by assigning it to unique genera, sections or subsections. Today, two competing treatments prevail: under the one that is currently (as of October 2025) accepted by Plants of the World Online, the species is considered to belong to Malus. Traditionally, many researchers have further classified the species within its own section, Eriolobus, but the validity of these subgroupings on morphological grounds in Malus has been questioned more recently. Alternatively, some authorities and databases separate M. trilobata within its own genus Eriolobus, as Eriolobus trilobatus.

Both classifications, in Malus and in Eriolobus, appear to be supported by research findings. M. trilobata resembles other Malus species in floral morphology, and it is similar to some Malus species in leaf shape. For these reasons, the Polish dendrologist Kazimierz Browicz (1969) considered it to be most closely related to Malus doumeri and, to a lesser extent, to Macromeles tschonoskii (which is also often placed in Malus), both of which are native to East Asia. On the other hand, M. trilobata differs in the grit cells in its fruits, which are more commonly associated with Pyrus, even though they also occur in some other Malus species. Furthermore, phytochemical studies have shown that, uniquely in Malus, trilobatin replaces phloridzin as the main phenolic compound in the leaves in M. trilobata, which may similarly be taken to indicate a need for separation.

Several varieties of the species have been described, including Eriolobus trilobatus var. oxyloba and Eriolobus trilobatus var. sorgerae, the latter of which was collected by Austrian botanist Friederike Sorger in Gömbe, Antalya Province, Turkey, and subsequently described as a distinct variety by Browicz, who emphasised its much smaller leaves, in 1976. Current consensus, however, recognises no subdivisions.

=== Modern taxonomy and evolution ===
Phylogenetic studies based on plastid and nuclear DNA indicate that Malus trilobata falls between other species normally classified as Malus, and it appears to be sister to M. florentina, with both species often, but not always, positioned together on a branch that also contains the North American species prairie crabapple (Malus ioensis), southern crabapple (M. angustifolius) and sweet crabapple (M. coronaria). In a study by Liu and colleagues (2022), this branch, called Clade II (a clade being a group of all organisms that descend from a common ancestor), is shown to either be basal to the rest of Malus, in nuclear phylogenies, or to be sister to Pourthiaea and thus closer to other Maleae such as Sorbus and Aronia than to Malus proper, in plastid phylogenies. This discordance between nuclear and plastid phylogenies, the authors proposed, could be due to several factors during the speciation process: incomplete lineage sorting, that is, the inheritance of an incomplete set of alleles from the most recent common ancestor; allopolyploidy, that is, the inheritance of more than two copies of alleles; or hybridisation, the crossing of species. All of these were important mechanisms underlying the evolution of the Maleae, the apple tribe, rendering the reconstruction of its evolutionary history difficult. Liu and colleagues proposed hybridisation as the most likely scenario, whereby the ancestor of Clade II hybridised with the ancestor of Pourthiaea, so that all its descendants, including M. trilobata, inherited Pourthiaea's chloroplast DNA through a process known as chloroplast capture.

According to Liu and colleagues (2022), Malus originated in North America and East Asia, most likely in the middle Eocene, between 41.2 and 44.39 million years ago. Also according to this study, Clade II, the clade M. trilobata belongs to, originated in western North America and subsequently spread to Europe and western Asia in the late Eocene via the North Atlantic Land Bridge. The split between Malus trilobata and its sister M. florentina, the two representatives of this clade in western Eurasia, was estimated to have occurred already in the early Oligocene, 32.81 million years ago. Malus antiqua, a fossil species with lobed leaves from the Pliocene (5.33–2.58 Mya) of Europe, recovered in Romania, is considered to be ancestral to M. trilobata or M. florentina.

=== Etymology ===
The genus name Malus is derived from Latin malus, meaning "apple tree". The epiphet trilobata means "three-lobed", and refers to the leaves of the species.

== Description ==
Malus trilobata is a medium-sized deciduous tree. It initially assumes a narrow, upright habit with horizontal or ascending branching, but becomes more rounded with age. The species usually attains a mature size of 6–10 metres (240–390 in) or up to 18 metres (59 feet) height by 7 m (23 ft) width. The leaves are deeply 3-lobed, with each lobe usually again divided into several pointed lobes, so that the leaf may almost appear palmate. In leaf shape, the species resembles certain species of maple (Acer), as well as the wild service-tree (Aria torminalis). The leaves are glossy and smooth (glabrous) above, bright green and hairy (pubescent) below, especially on the veins. They are rather stiff and slightly wider (9–10 centimetres (3.5–3.9 in) than long (5–8 centimetres (2.0–3.1 in), turning from orange to red to deep purple in fall. The branchlets are initially densely pubescent, but become smooth quickly.

The tree blooms relatively late — usually between May and June — bearing large flowers with white petals and up to 4 centimetres (1.6 in) in diameter, with flowers appearing in loose umbels of up to 10. The petals narrow abruptly towards the ovary, creating a rounded space between them. The apple fruits ripen in fall, between October and November. They are roundish and large, being around 2.5 centimetres (0.98 in) in diameter and weighing around 12 grams (0.42 oz). Yellow in colour, they are edible and reportedly have a good taste. The pulp has grit cells, which is otherwise atypical of apples, but common in pears. The seeds are dark and around 7 centimetres (2.8 in) in diameter. The bark of the tree is dark grey, deeply fissured and scaly with age. The species develops a deep root system, and is noted to be drought-resistant. M. trilobata is a long-lived species, with 350-450 years age estimated for old specimens in Isparta and Antalya, Turkey.

M. trilobata is diploid, with a chromosome number of 2n=34.

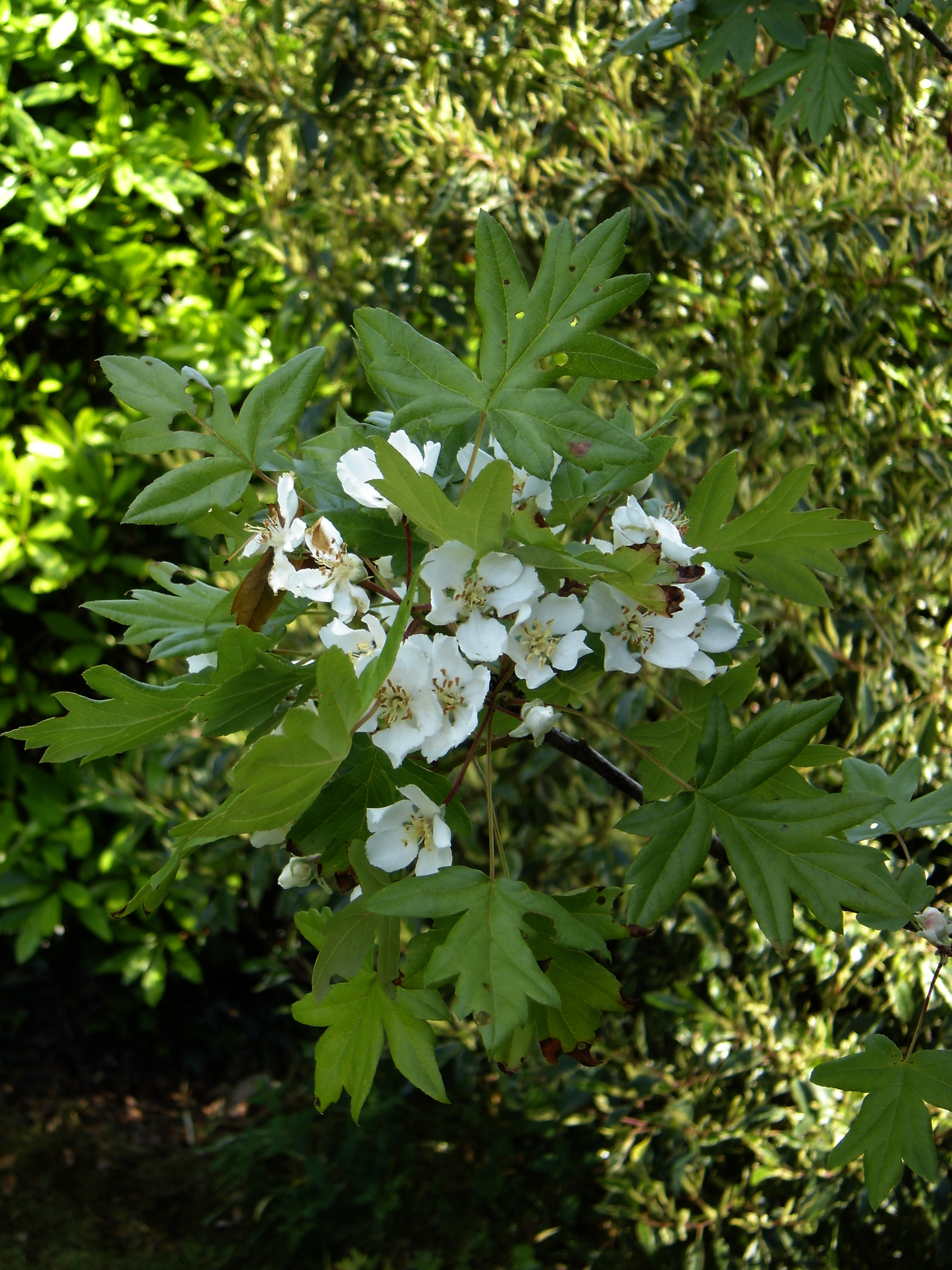
M. trilobata flowers and leaves

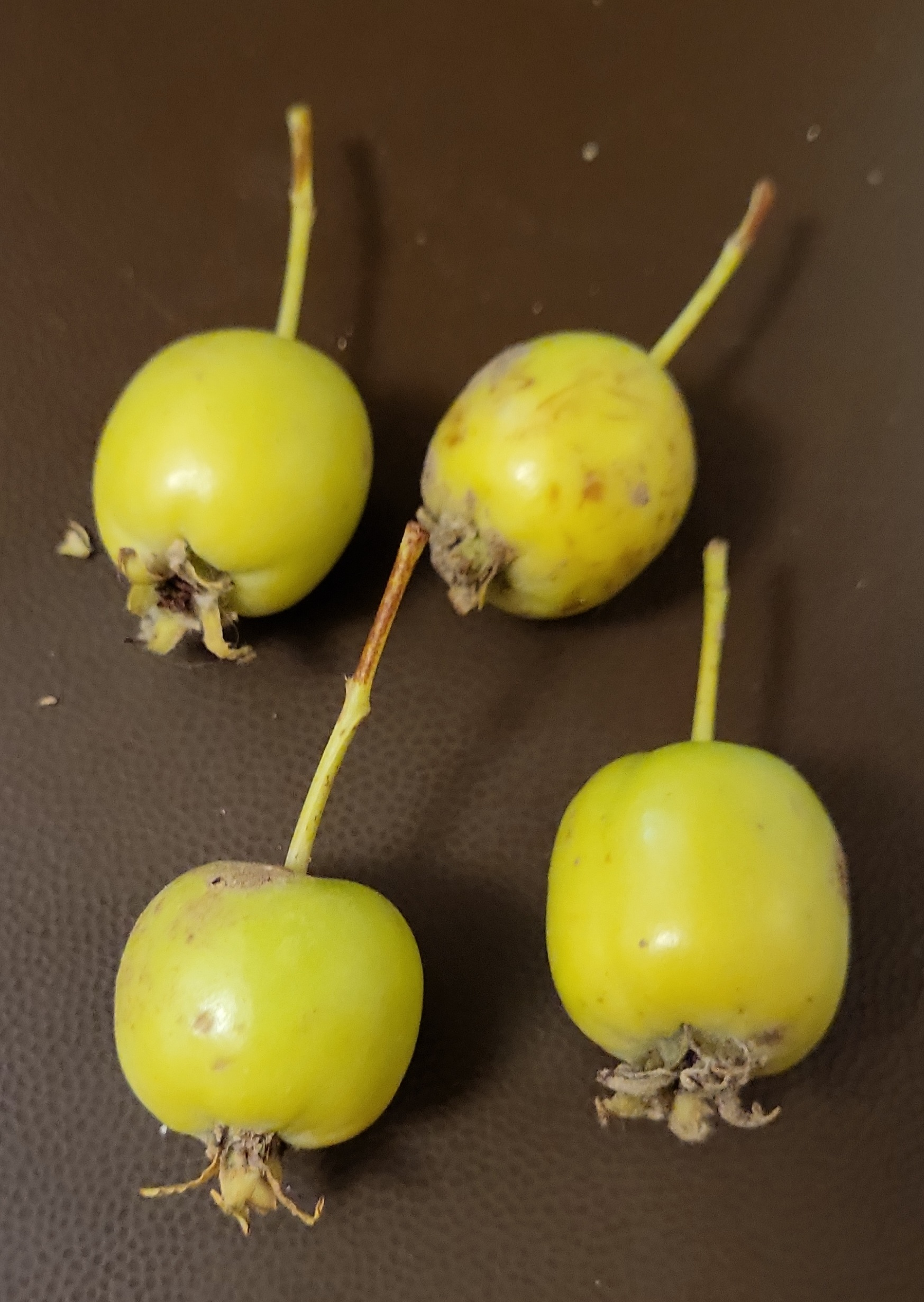
Fruit of Malus trilobata

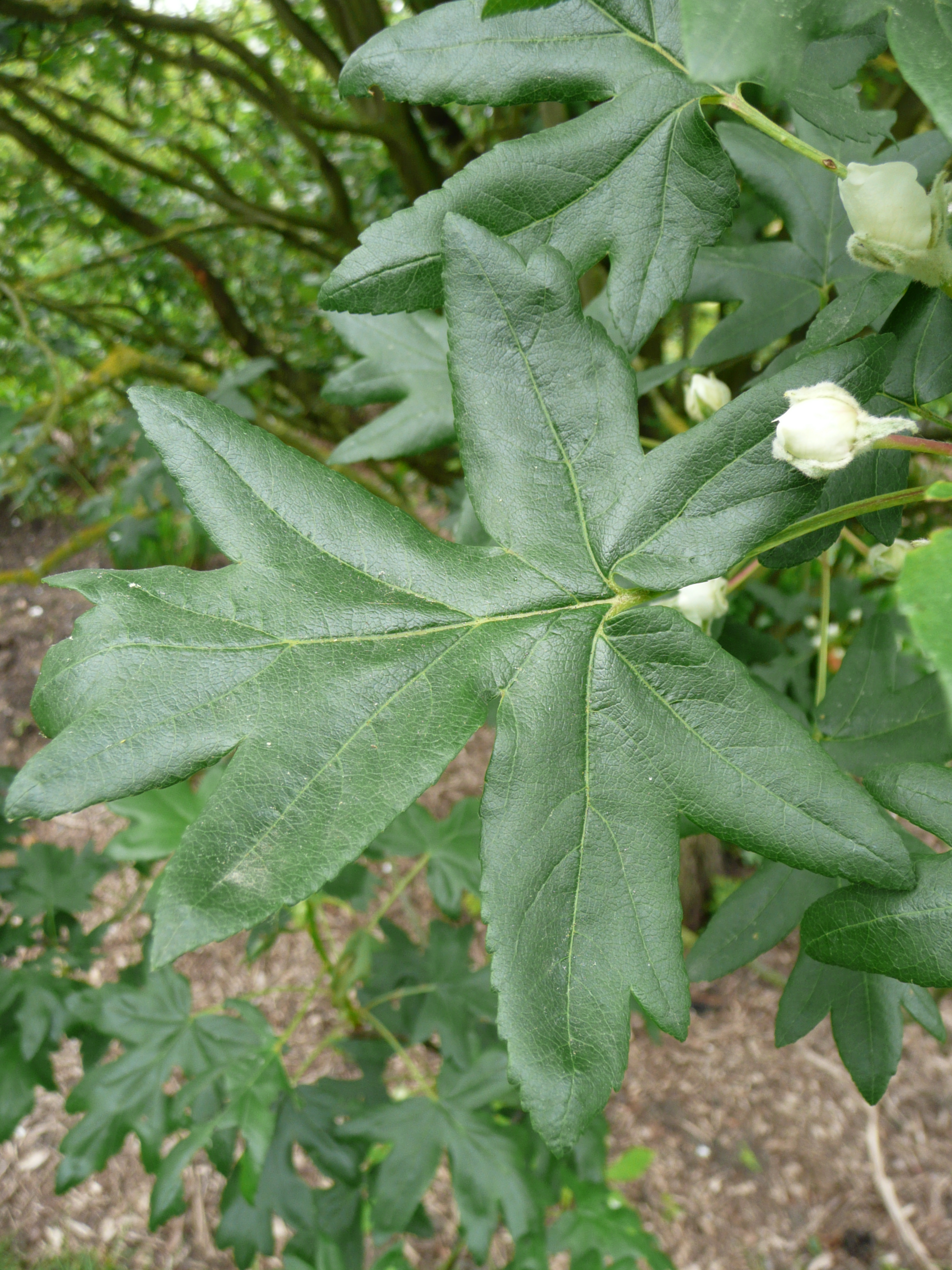
Leaf of Malus trilobata

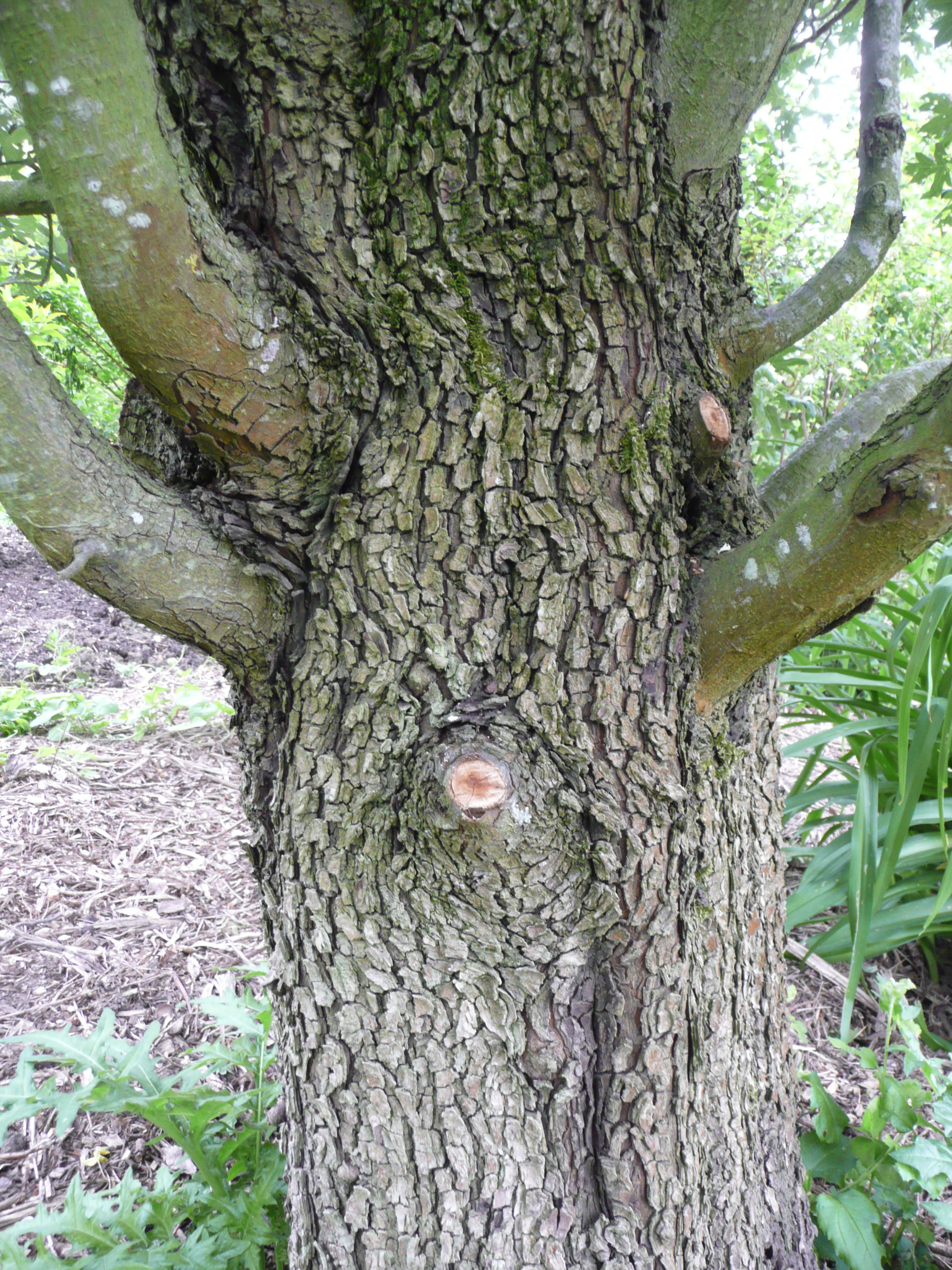
Bark of Malus trilobata

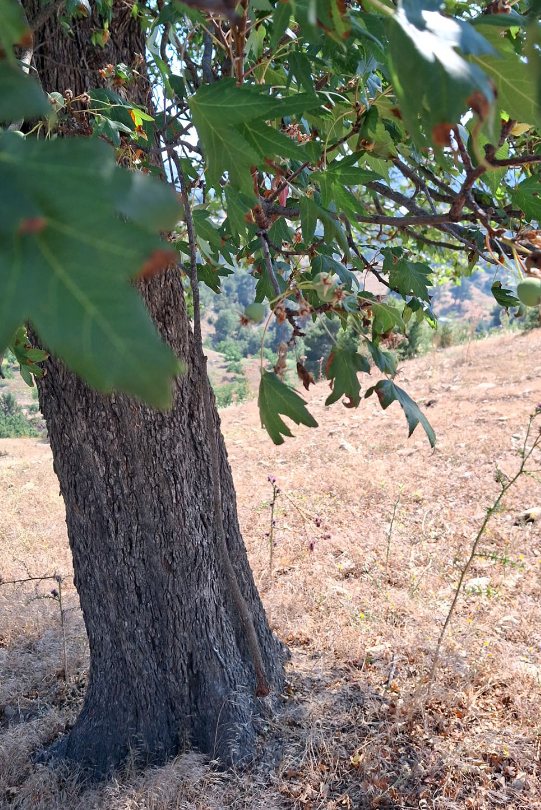
Old M. trilobata tree in Antalya Province

== Distribution and ecology ==
Malus trilobata is distributed in mountainous terrain in the eastern Mediterranean, however, its range is remarkably disjunct, consisting of several disconnected populations. In the European part of its range, the species has been recorded down to 50 metres (160 ft) altitude, but it has also been observed at 1,600 metres (5,200 ft) and 1,800 metres (5,900 ft) on Şaphane Mountain and Mount Lebanon, respectively. M. trilobata is not endemic to Lebanon, despite claims to the contrary.

In Europe, M. trilobata is known from Thrace, specifically Evros Prefecture in Greece and the eastern Rhodopes in Bulgaria. Here, it occurs between 166–380 metres (545–1,247 ft) in xero-thermophilous communities on acidic siliceous soil, together with deciduous oaks (pubescent oak Quercus pubescens, valonia oak Q. ithaburensis subsp. macrolepis, Hungarian oak Q. frainetto) and Turkish pine (Pinus brutia), fellow Rosaceae (wild service-tree Aria torminalis, sorb tree Cormus domestica, almond-leaved pear Pyrus spinosa), mock privet (Phillyrea latifolia), Greek strawberry tree (Arbutus andrachne), oriental hornbeam (Carpinus orientalis), flowering ash (Fraxinus ornus), terebinth (Pistacia terebinthus), tanner's sumach (Rhus coriaria), Eastern prickly juniper (Juniperus deltoides), garland thorn (Paliurus spina-christi), bladder-senna (Colutea arborescens), black bryony (Dioscorea communis), pink rock-rose (Cistus creticus), wild asparagus (Asparagus acutifolius) and traveller's joy (Clematis vitalba).

In Anatolia, the species is primarily distributed in the Aegean and Mediterranean regions, that is, the northwest, southwest, south and southeast of the peninsula. The largest populations exist in the Taurus Mountains between the Berit Daǧi and Amanus mountains while a sizeable population exists also in Antalya Province where, however, the species is reportedly not common either. In the vicinity of Antalya, M. trilobata occurs on neutral and chalky as well as sandy soils in oak and pine forest communities between 710–1,400 metres (2,330–4,590 ft) altitude alongside oaks (Turkey oak Quercus cerris, kermes oak Q. coccifera), black pine (Pinus nigra subsp. pallasiana), Rosaceae including common hawthorn (Crataegus monogyna subsp. monogyna), oleaster-leaved pear (Pyrus elaeagrifolia subsp. elaeagrifolia), dog rose (Rosa canina) and holy bramble (Rubus ulmifolius subsp. sanctus), junipers (Eastern prickly juniper Juniperus deltoides, Greek juniper J. excelsa subsp. excelsa), storax (Styrax officinalis), Spanish broom (Spartium junceum), balsamic sage (Salvia tomentosa), large-flowered lampwick (Phlomis grandiflora subsp. grandiflora), sowbread (Cyclamen cilicicum), yellow-spine thistle (Picnomon acarna) and smilax (Smilax aspera). During ethnopharmacological research across the species' range in Turkey, respondents that were familiar with it consistently associated it with high altitudes and moist microclimates, including northern slopes and streamsides, which was also confirmed by site surveys. However, trees were occasionally also found at lower elevations and close to human settlements, including in cemeteries and fields.

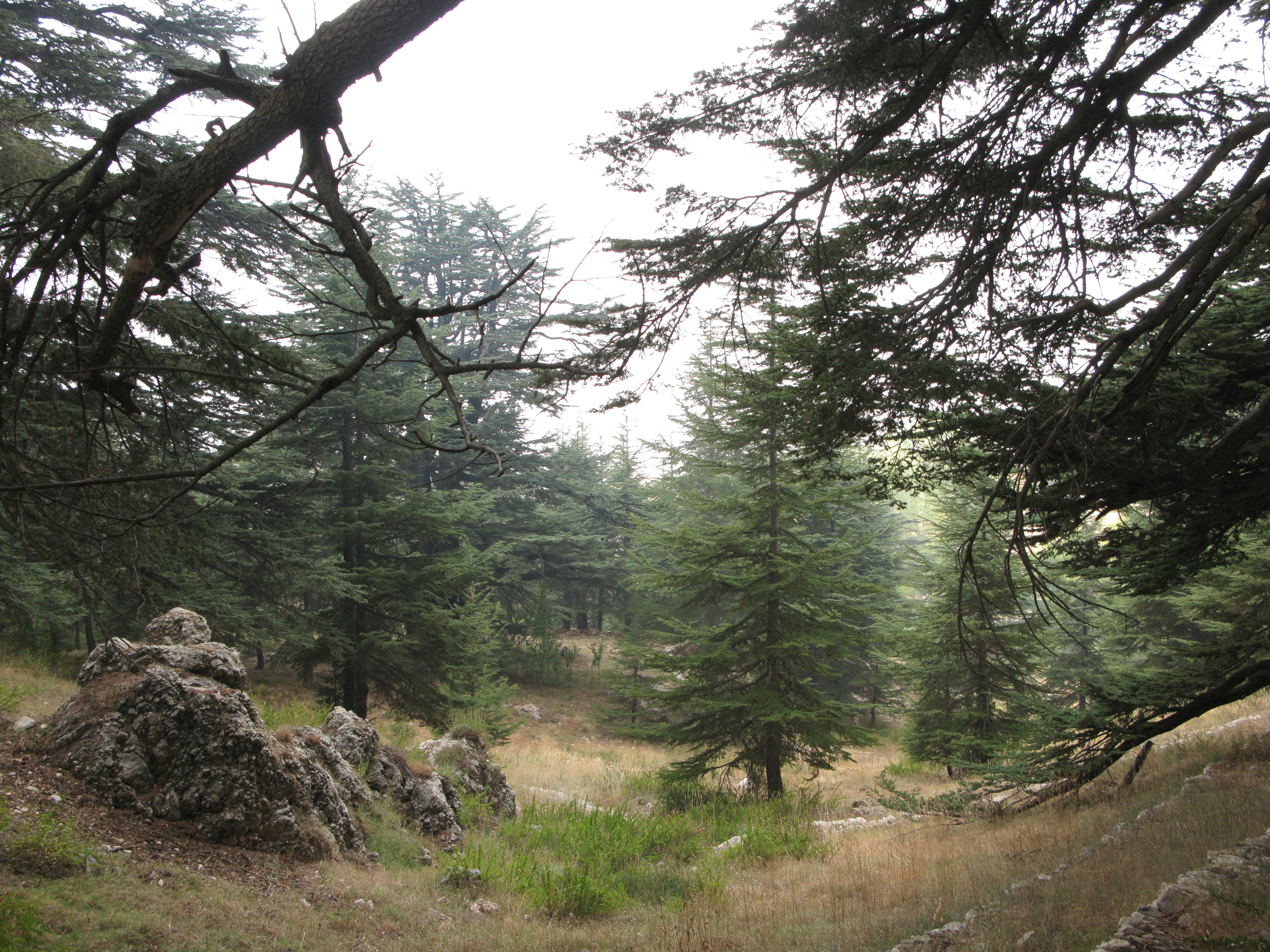
Malus trilobata occurs at some frequency in the Lebanon cedar forests of Mount Lebanon

Apparently the largest population persists in the Levant, especially in the Lebanon Mountains of Lebanon, which is also the type locality of the species. For example, a large population occurs in Horsh Ehden nature reserve. Nevertheless, the species is rare also in Lebanon: a comprehensive 2018 survey identified a total of 55 localities, the lowest count among the 27 tree species surveyed, with the next lowest count being 92 for silver almond (Prunus argentea). In contrast, Aleppo oak (Quercus infectoria) and kermes oak (Q. coccifera), the two most frequently recorded species, were found at 2092 and 1914 locations, respectively. In Upper Galilee, M. trilobata is a component of mesophytic plant communities dominated by kermes oak, together with Syrian maple (Acer obtusifolium), buckthorn (Rhamnus alaternus, R. punctata), hawthorns (common hawthorn Crataegus monogyna, azarole C. azarolus), bay laurel (Laurus nobilis), ivy (Hedera helix), butcher's-broom (Ruscus aculeatus) and wild peony (Paeonia mascula).

Throughout its range, M. trilobata is distributed mainly on rocky slopes and neutral and acidic soils. While it is occasionally found at low altitudes, particularly in the western parts of its range, it is primarily a species of Mediterranean high-elevation pine and cedar forests, dominated by Turkish pine (Pinus brutia), black pine (Pinus nigra subsp. pallasiana), and Lebanon cedar (Cedrus libani). Throughout its range, the species is largely restricted to seaside slopes close to the sea, and ecological niche modelling conducted in Lebanon indicates that it requires cooler temperatures, ample rainfall (1,000 mm (39 in)) and more than 20% cloud cover, suggesting that it is a Mediterranean mountain or temperate relict species. Of the local tree species, it is thus most similar to Cilician fir (Abies cilicica), Balkan maple (Acer hyrcanum subsp. tauricola), Lebanon cedar (Cedrus libani), flowering ash (Fraxinus ornus), Syrian juniper (Juniperus drupacea), Turkey oak (Quercus cerris), sessile oak (Quercus petraea subsp. pinnatiloba), Quercus kotschyana, and wild service-tree (Aria torminalis), and is no Mediterranean species in the strict sense. M. trilobata is insect-pollinated, and, like other Malus, is thought to be pollinated primarily by bees. It bears large fruit that drop to the ground when ripe, and is most likely primarily consumed by mammals, including horses and deer, which is also reflected in autochthonous names, such as deer apple and horse apple. Research conducted in Horsh Ehden, Lebanon, indicated that M. trilobata saplings were strongly facilitated by the presence of mature prickly juniper (Juniperus deltoides) individuals, as these reduced environmental stress, particularly if their canopy cover was reduced by dwarf mistletoe (Arceuthobium oxycedri) infestation, which can induce severe foliage loss. On the other hand, M. trilobata saplings were only recorded in forest gaps, as opposed to the closed forest inside. The species can also regenerate vegetatively, via root suckers. M. trilobata is a host plant for Ropalopus ledereri, a species of longhorn beetle from the eastern Mediterranean that feeds on the thin terminal branches of Malus species, Crataegus species and kermes oak.

== Uses and cultivation ==
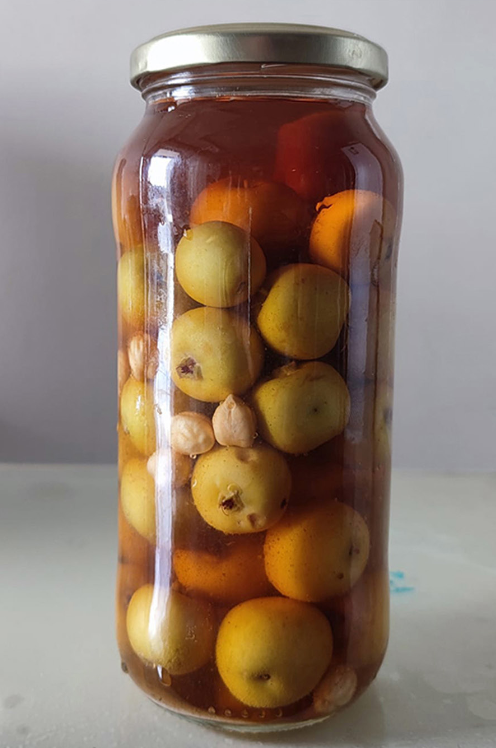
Pickled fruit of M. trilobata

In Greece, the species is locally known as Bragania and was traditionally protected from logging for its edible fruits. In Turkey, the species has many local names, but is most frequently referred to as Geyik Elması. However, this name is also at times applied to other fruit trees, including Sorbus and Crataegus, with which it is frequently confused. Local names in the Levant include Machlis, Makhlis and Mahrîs.

Traditionally, the leaves and fruits of Malus trilobata were used for treatment of a number of ailments, including heart diseases, diabetes, asthma and gastritis, shortness of breath, and hypertension. Tea made from the flowers and leaves is claimed to lower cholesterol and have a relaxing effect. Indeed, the species has attracted enthnopharmacological interest. Additionally, one study suggested that microbiota isolated from the leaves, bulk soil, and roots of M. trilobata could be a source of biocontrol agents for Botrytis cinerea and Penicillium expansum, fungi that colonise apples post-harvest. These microbiota, the study suggested, could potentially help alleviate some of the economic damage these fungi cause, and may represent a future alternative to fungicides. One study also suggested that antibacterial compounds for controlling multidrug-resistant strains of bacteria such as Staphylococcus aureus could be yielded from the rhizosphere of M. trilobata. Furthermore, the fruit of the species has culinary potential. In particular, it has high nutritional value, and is rich in malic acid, chlorogenic acid, epicatechin, rutin, and fructose. In Greece and Turkey, M. trilobata fruit is locally eaten, both in raw and in canned form, and it is used to make vinegar, compote and molasses in Turkey.

In cultivation, M. trilobata is noted for its robustness, including its frost and drought tolerance, and its insensitivity towards infections. It tolerates freezing temperatures, being hardy down to RHS H6 and USDA hardiness zone 5-9. For these reasons and its attractive habit, it finds increasing use in urban planning and landscaping, having demonstrated its value in a variety of settings and climates. Due to its narrow shape, the species is especially suitable as a road tree. 'Guardsman' is a commonly used cultivar, which is characterised by a particularly narrow crown, although some authors have questioned whether it is truly different from other clones of this species. Seeds of the species require about 3 months cold stratification, after which they can be sown in pots, which should be large to encourage good growth. The size of seedlings grown in pots may additionally be enhanced through the application of nitrogen fertilizer.

== Status and conservation ==
Malus trilobata is a rare species, occurring as isolated trees or groups of trees virtually in its entire range. Most recently (2017), it was classified as near threatened (NT) on the IUCN Red List, but with an unknown population trend. This assessment was justified on the grounds that the known subpopulations are small, isolated, and fragmented, with an estimated area of occupancy (AOO) of 2,550 square kilometres (980 mi^{2}), approaching the threshold for vulnerable (VU). Known threats include land use changes, cutting, overgrazing, fires, urban expansion and agriculture. Additionally, the species appears to suffer from poor recruitment and a limited ability to colonise new habitats. Indeed, research carried out in Turkey found that trees were mostly old, with natural regeneration often lacking. Local, anecdotal evidence similarly suggests that the species is declining, with approximately 40% of its distribution in Greece devastated by wildfires between 2007 and 2011. The majority of the European population is located in the Dadia-Lefkimi-Soufli Forest National Park, 58% of which were impacted by extreme wildfires in 2023. The genetic structure of the European population in Evros has been scrutinised, revealing relatively low genetic diversity and population fragmentation due to roads, firebreaks and geographical isolation. M. trilobata is represented in several seed orchard, ex situ conservation and germplasm collections, and is being planted as part of restoration efforts in Lebanon.
