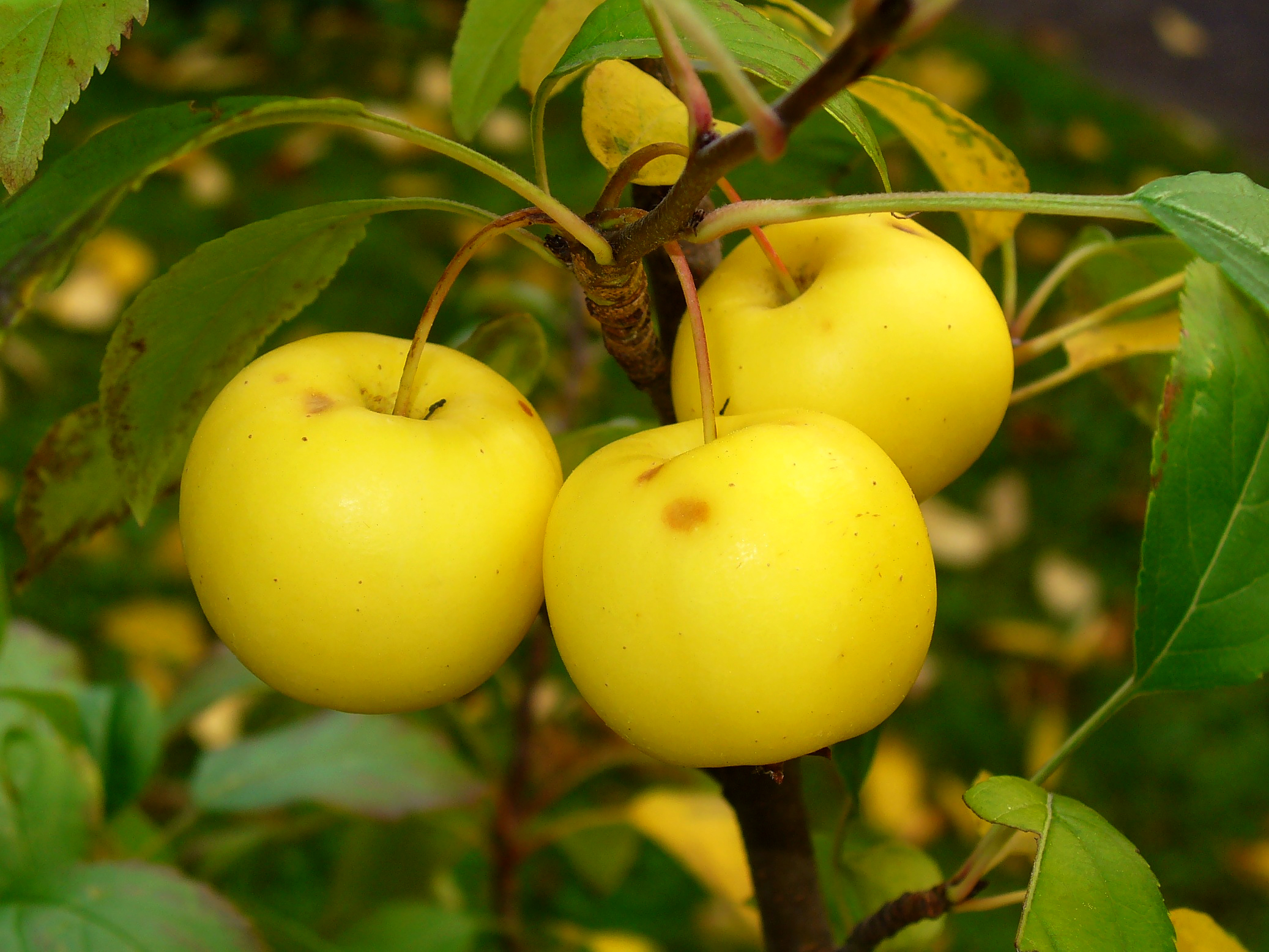

Conservation status
- Data Deficient (IUCN 3.1)

Scientific classification
- Kingdom: Plantae
- Clade: Tracheophytes
- Clade: Angiosperms
- Clade: Eudicots
- Clade: Rosids
- Order: Rosales
- Family: Rosaceae
- Genus: Malus
- Species: M. sylvestris

Binomial name
- Malus sylvestris (L.) Mill.

= Malus sylvestris =

Species of apple tree

Malus sylvestris, the European crab apple, also known as the European wild apple or simply the crab apple, is a species of the genus Malus. Its scientific name means "forest apple", reflecting its habitat. It is native from central Europe to western Asia.

== Description ==
The wild apple is a deciduous small to medium-sized tree, but can also grow into a multi-stemmed bush. It can live 80–100 years and grow up to 14 metres (46 feet) tall with trunk diameters of usually 23–45 centimetres (9–17 1/2 inches), although diameters exceeding 90 cm (35 in) have been recorded. The leaves are roundish-oval and sometimes hairy on the underside. The hermaphrodite flowers appear in May to June, slightly preceding hawthorn, have white or pinkish petals and are insect-pollinated. The small pome-fruits are around 3 cm (1 1/4 in) in diameter, ripen in autumn and fall to the ground. The bark is light brown and breaks up in flakes. The branches are spiny, especially in response to pruning or browsing.

=== Identification ===
European wild apples hybridise readily with domesticated apples, which can make identification difficult, as hybrids commonly exhibit transitional traits from both parent species. While certain identification relies on genetic testing, field identification can be made by examining the following features. The crown of wild apples is densely branched, whereas the crown of domesticated apples tends to be more loosely arranged with fewer, straighter branches. Wild apple leaves tend to be somewhat smaller, stiffer and shinier. The underside of wild apple leaves also tends to be less hairy than those of both domesticated and hybrid apples, often lacking hairs altogether. Additionally, wild apple fruits tend to be smaller, usually below 3 cm (1 1/4 in) in diameter, while domesticated and hybrid apples tend to be larger. According to a 2022 study by Feulner et al., a reliable field identification can be made, but flowers are required for this. Thus, pure wild apples can be reliably distinguished from hybrids by a combination of a hairless calyx, hairless midrib and hairless veins on the underside of the leaf, as well as an at most sparsely hairy leaf surface. Of these, the hairiness of the calyx was found to be the most important feature, with hybrids consistently possessing hairy calyces even if the leaves were glabrous.

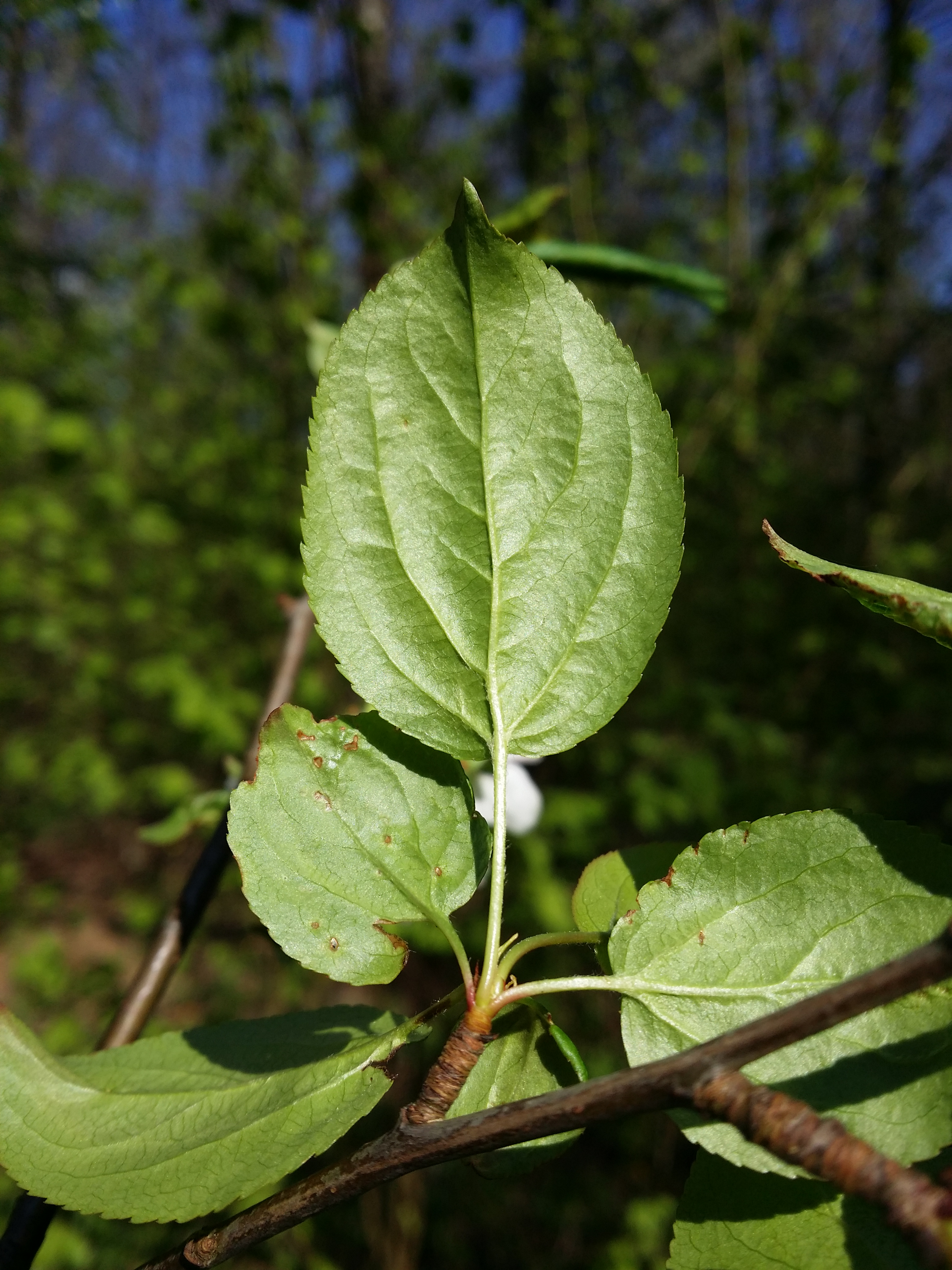
Leaves are mostly glabrous on the underside.

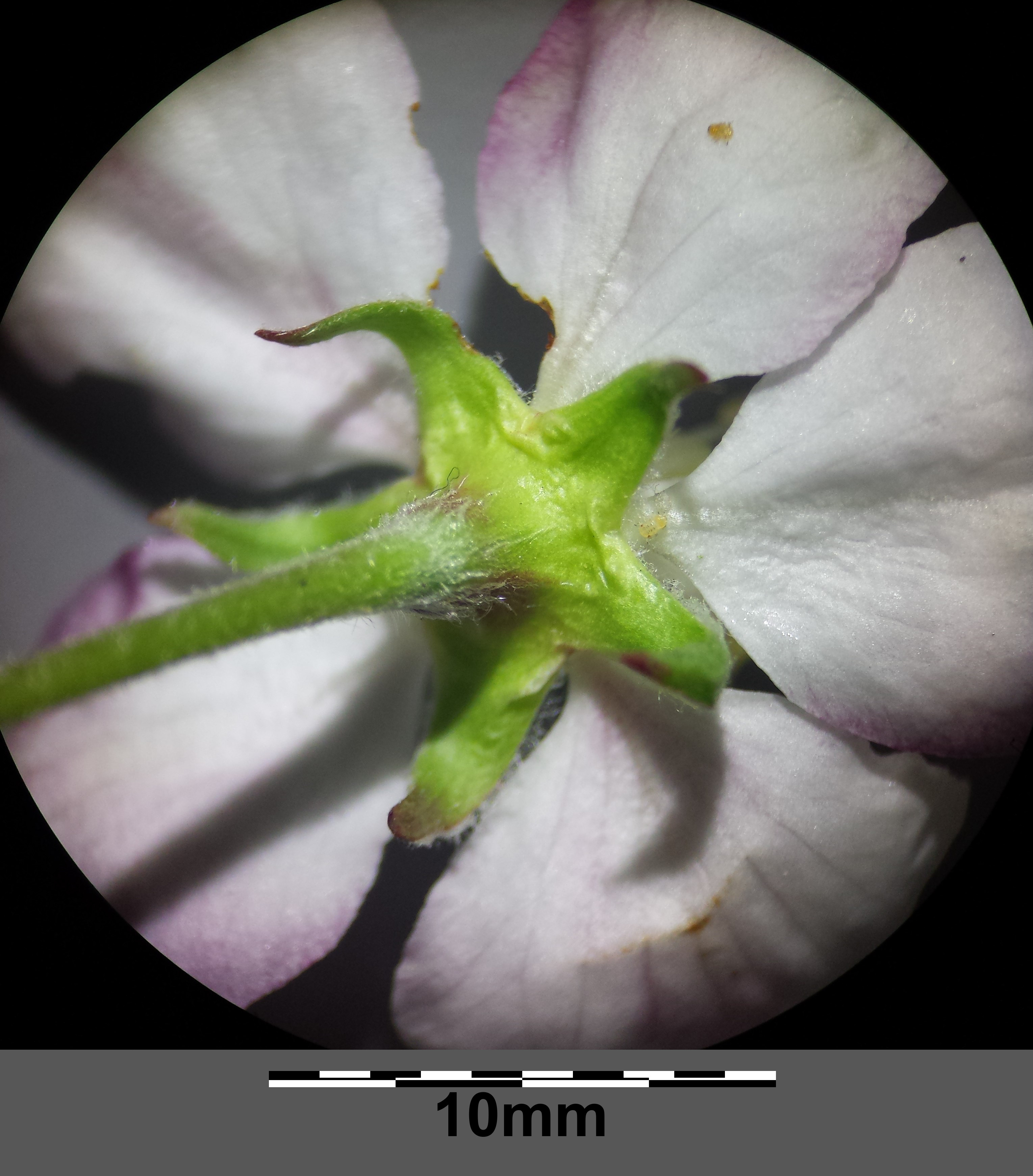
Calyces are always glabrous.

== Taxonomy ==
Its scientific name means "forest apple".

=== Genetics and postglacial recolonization ===
Like most European tree species, the distribution of the European wild apple was limited to refugia in southern Europe during the Last Glacial Period. For the European wild apple, these refugia seem to have constituted southern France and northern Spain, the Balkans and possibly the Carpathians, respectively. From there, it recolonized the rest of Europe following the glacial retreat at the onset of the Holocene, and the colonization paths find themselves reflected in its modern distribution and genetic structure. Again as in many other organisms in Europe, plants and animals alike, the population of the European wild apple is divided into a large western population and a more strongly differentiated eastern population. Western Europe and northern Europe were most likely colonized from southern France, while eastern Europe was colonized from the Carpathians. In the process, some admixture between both populations seems to have occurred as they met.

=== Progenitor of cultivated apples ===
In the past M. sylvestris was thought to be the most important ancestor of the cultivated apple (M. domestica), which has since been shown to have been primarily derived from the central Asian species M. sieversii. As confirmed by DNA analyses, M. sylvestris has contributed significantly to the genome. Secondary introgression from other species of the genus Malus has greatly shaped the genome of M. domestica, with M. sylvestris being the largest secondary contributor. Current populations of M. domestica are more closely related to M. sylvestris than to M. sieversii, while in more pure strains of M. domestica, the M. sieversii ancestry still predominates.

== Distribution and habitat ==
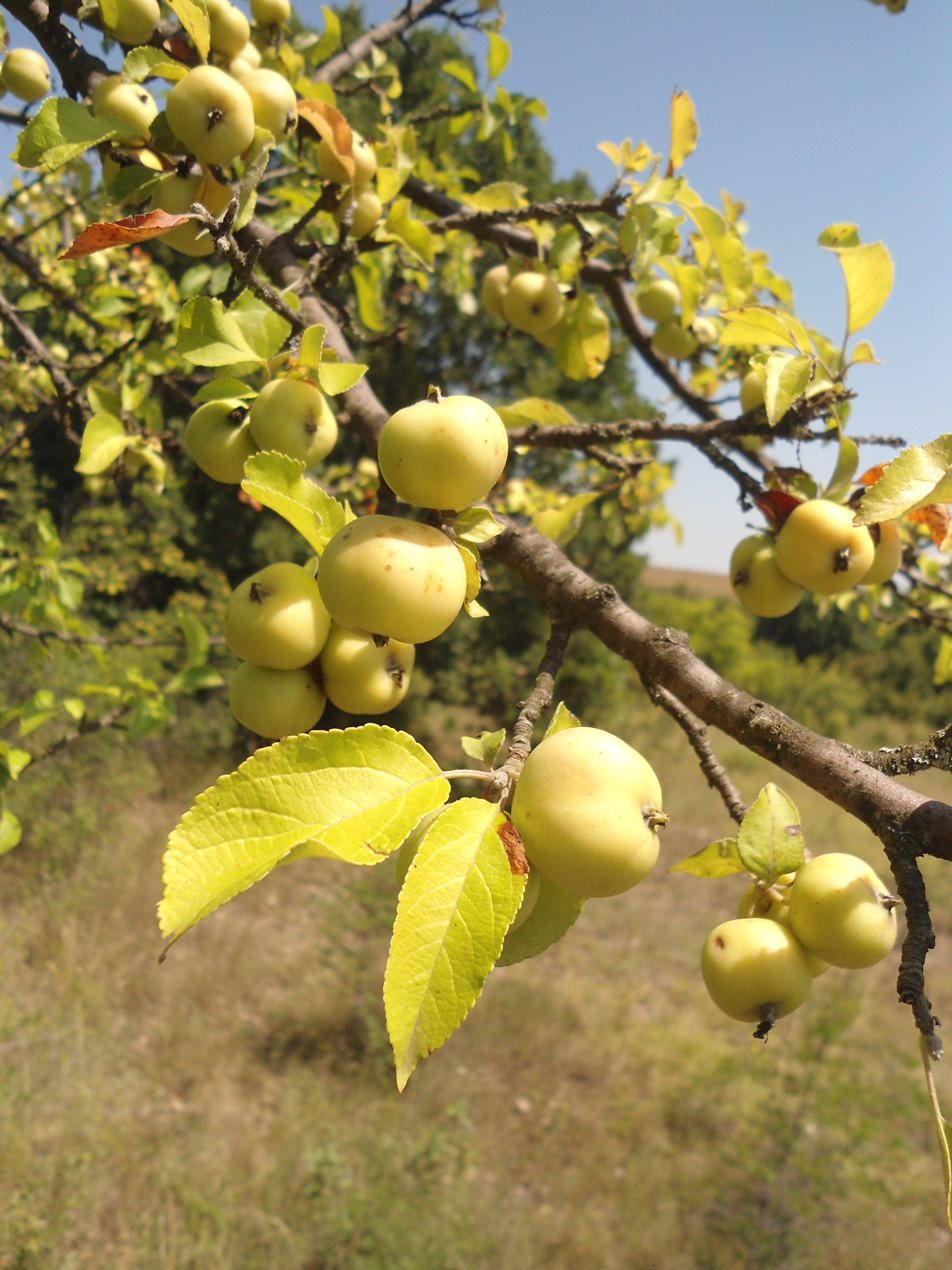
Fruiting crabapple branch in Bulgaria

The tree is widespread throughout Europe, with the exception of the extreme north and south. Additionally, it is also distributed in Anatolia and further into the south Caucasus. It occurs in a scattered distribution pattern as single individuals or in small groups. Due to its weak competitiveness and high light requirement, the wild apple is found mostly at sites where competition is reduced, such as the wet edge of forests, in wood pasture, farmland hedges or on very extreme, marginal sites. In the British Isles it occurs throughout Ireland, England and Wales and with reduced frequency in Scotland. In Scotland, it is most commonly found in woodlands and wood pastures.

== Ecology and threats ==
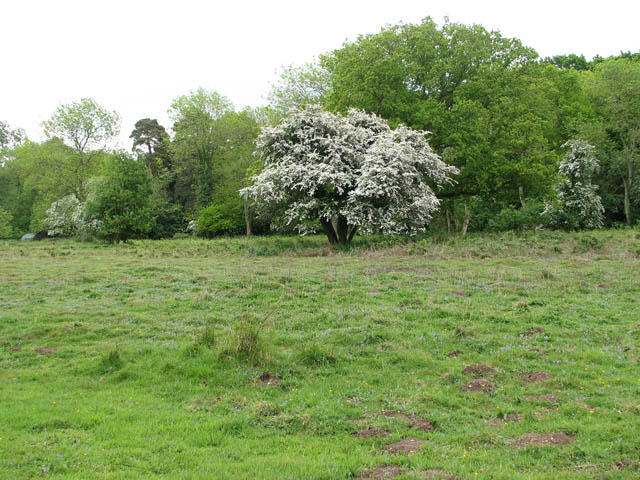
Wild apple tree in full bloom

The European wild apple is dispersed primarily by mammals, which eat the fruits. In a study from Mols, Denmark, it was determined that cattle accounted for the bulk of dispersal, followed by horses, despite the presence of wild animals. In Britain, the crab apple is associated with 93 species of insect. Its leaves are food of the hawthorn moth (Scythropia crataegella).

Throughout its range, the wild apple is threatened and rare. Threats include the introgression from domesticated apples, the lack of natural regeneration and modern forestry practice, which promotes the closure of forest canopy cover, as opposed to the formerly prevailing coppice. In many aspects, the wild apple exhibits adaptations to grazing and the presence of large herbivores, and consequently also a high degree of dependence on them. It is thorny, suitable for coppice due to pronounced resprouting abilities and a very hardy tree. Wild apples may survive crown collapse and the breakage of major branches. In dispersal, it appears to be strongly reliant on bovines and equines. Since the extinction of both wild horses and aurochsen, and the near-extinction of the European bison, domesticated livestock seems to have assumed this role and replaced their extinct relatives. With the abolition of traditional pasturage in town commons beginning in the 16th century, however, and the rearing of livestock in factory farms as a consequence of agricultural intensification, these large herbivores are now largely absent from the landscape. Additionally, while research indicates the widespread existence of half-open savanna ecosystems during Europe's prehistory, shaped and maintained by megafauna, this is no more the case. Nowadays, the landscape in many parts of Europe is marked by closed-canopy forest, often intensively managed, coupled with agricultural fields and urban spaces, with little else and few transitional zones such as mantle and fringe vegetation. As a result, European wild apple today lacks both suitable habitats and dispersal opportunities, resulting in a lack of successful regeneration.

== Gallery ==
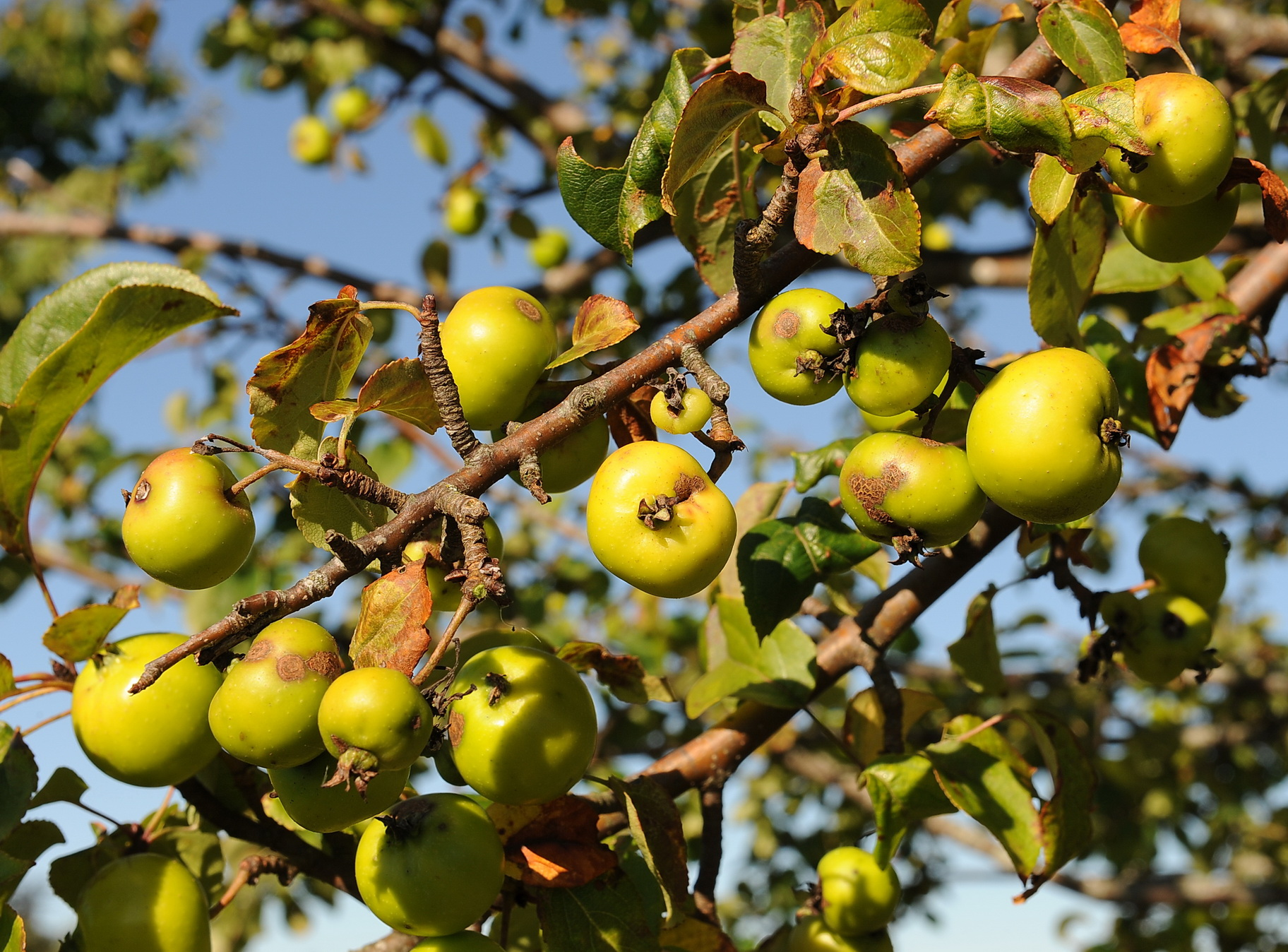
Ripe crab apples on the branch

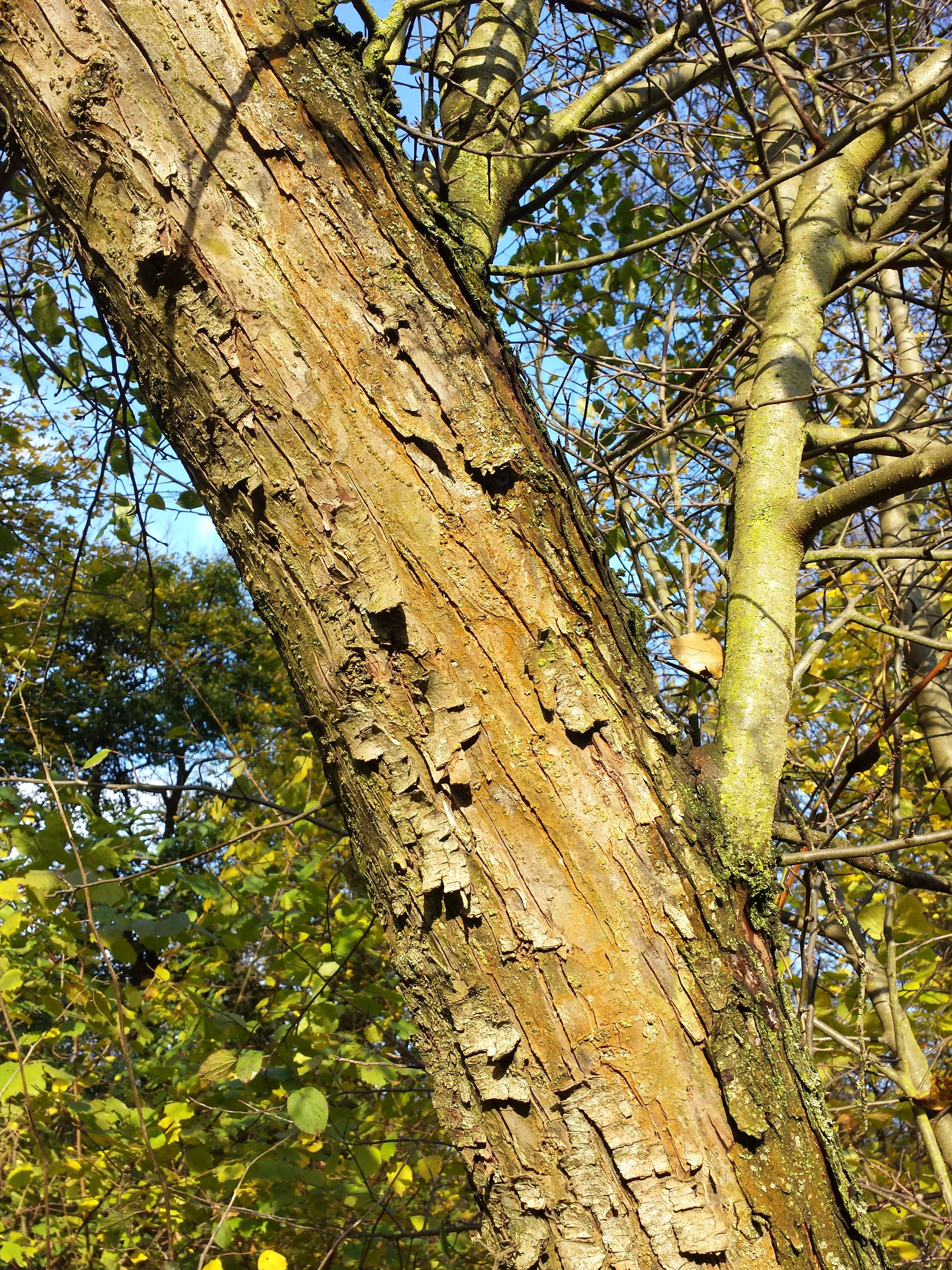
Bark

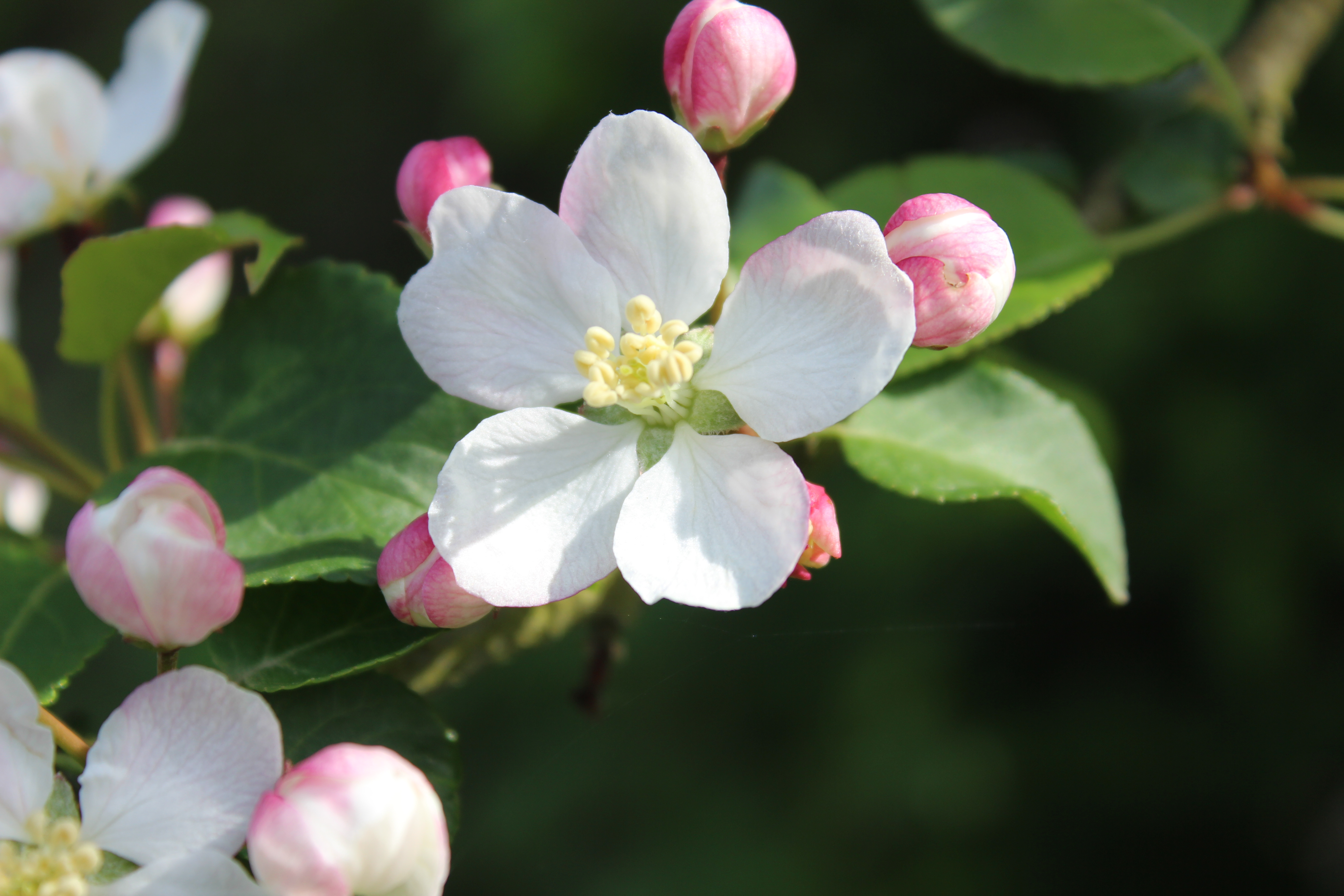
Flower in bloom

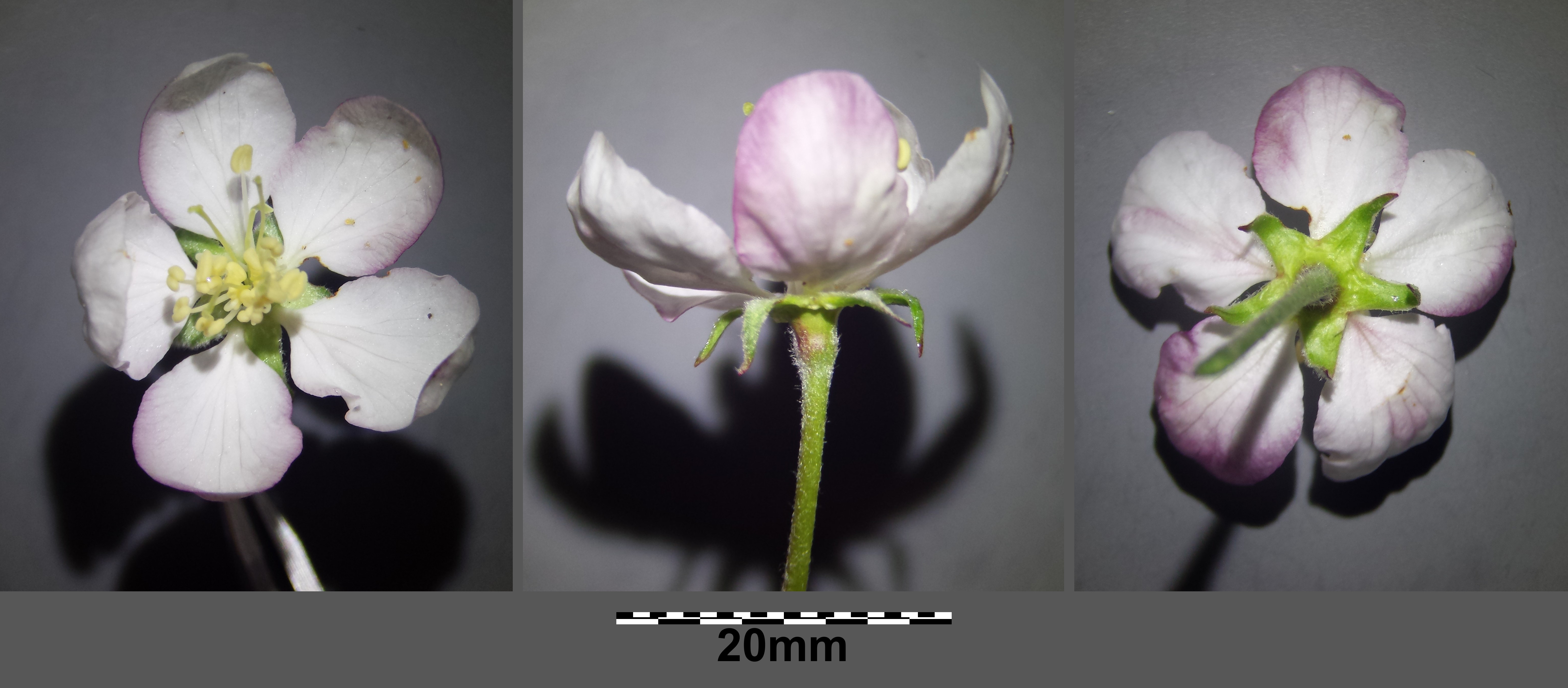
Flowers

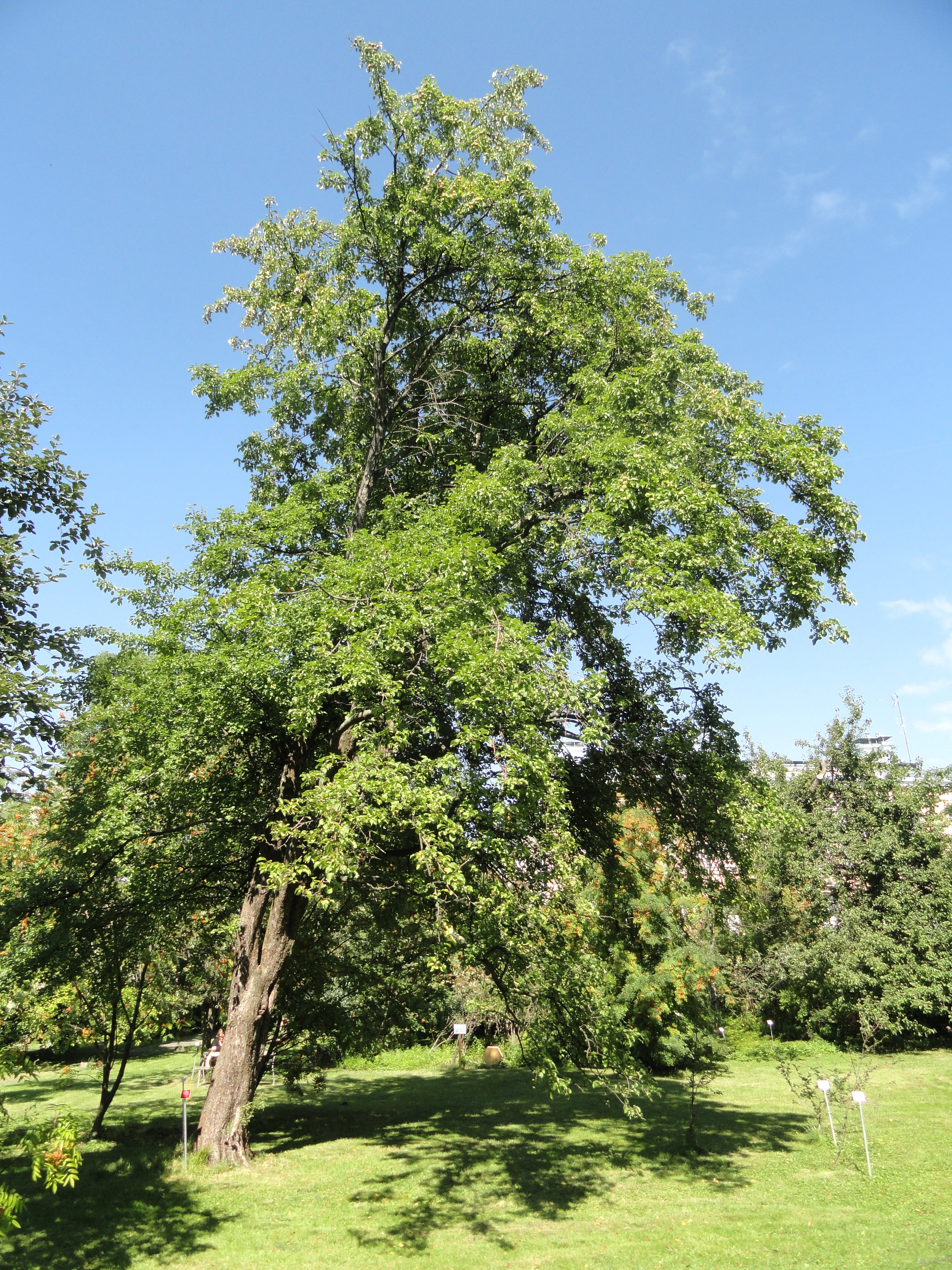
Mature tree

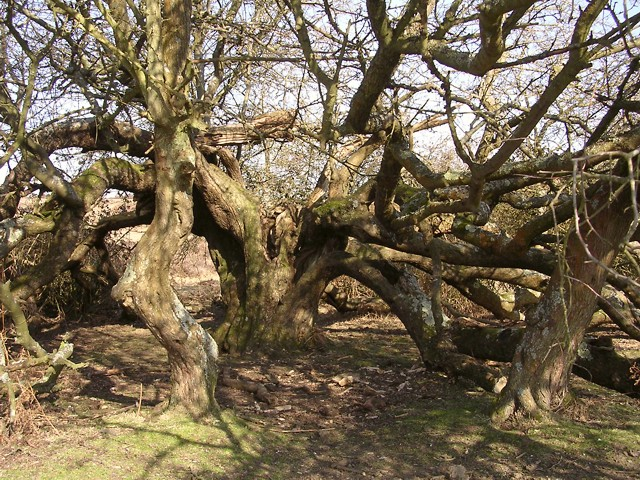
Ancient tree

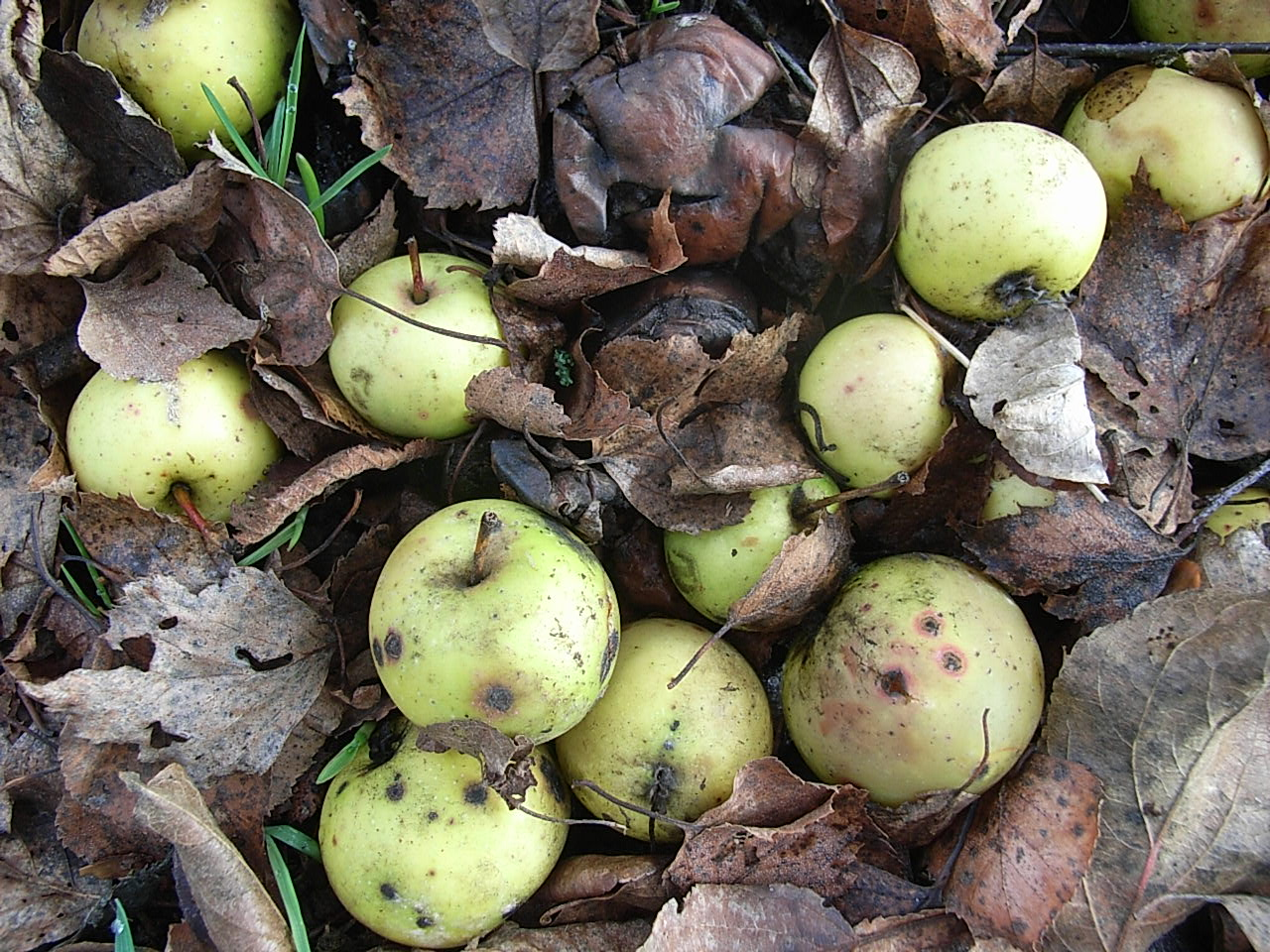
Ripe fruit on the ground

== See also ==
- Wood-pasture hypothesis
- Pleistocene megafauna
- Pyrus pyraster
- Malus crescimannoi
- Malus orientalis
- Malus trilobata
- Malus florentina
