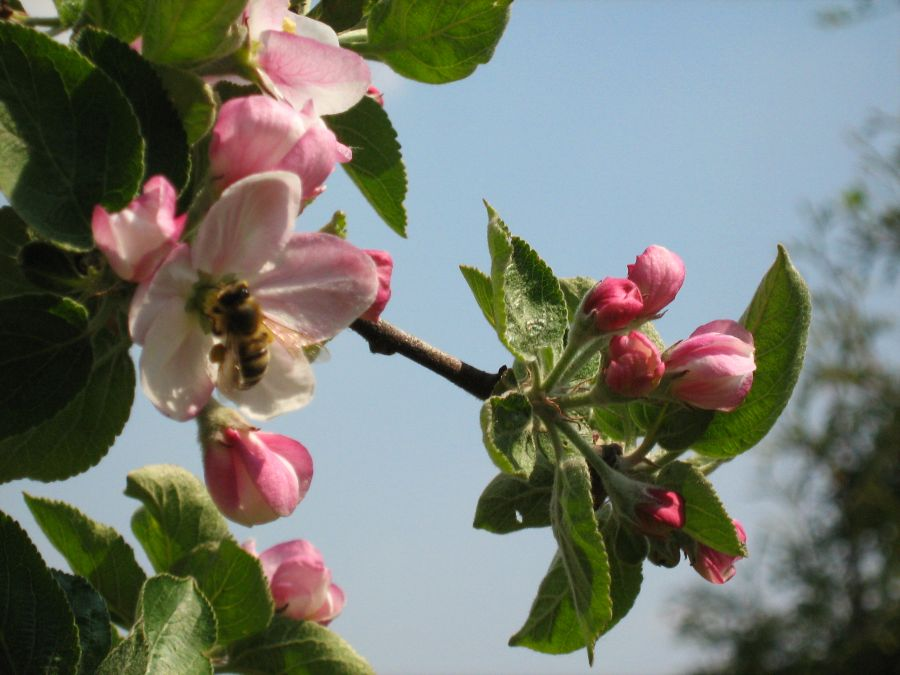

Scientific classification
- Kingdom: Plantae
- Clade: Tracheophytes
- Clade: Angiosperms
- Clade: Eudicots
- Clade: Rosids
- Order: Rosales
- Family: Rosaceae
- Genus: Malus
- Species: M. orientalis

Binomial name
- Malus orientalis Uglitzk.

Synonyms
- List: Malus montana Uglitzk.; Malus montana var. acuminata Botsch.; Malus montana var. diversifolia Botsch.; Malus orientalis var. brevipedunculata Botsch.; Malus orientalis f. lanata Botsch.; Malus orientalis var. lanceolata Botsch.; Malus orientalis var. montana (Uglitzk.) Langenf.; Malus orientalis subsp. montana (Uglitzk.) Likhonos; Malus orientalis var. subalpina Ponomar.; Malus sylvestris subsp. orientalis (Uglitzk.) Soó; Pyrus paradisii M.F.Fay & Christenh.; Pyrus sapientiae M.F.Fay & Christenh.

= Malus orientalis =

Species of plant

Malus orientalis, the eastern crabapple or Caucasus apple, is a species of flowering plant in the family Rosaceae. It is found in Bulgaria, Turkey (including East Thrace), the Caucasus region, Iran, and Afghanistan.

With its relatively large yellow fruit, it has been consumed by people for millennia, with a string of halved, dried fruit being found in a royal tomb at Ur. Drying the fruit and then rehydrating by boiling cuts the tartness. Malus orientalis contributed to the gene pool of domesticated apples, along with M. sieversii and M. sylvestris.
