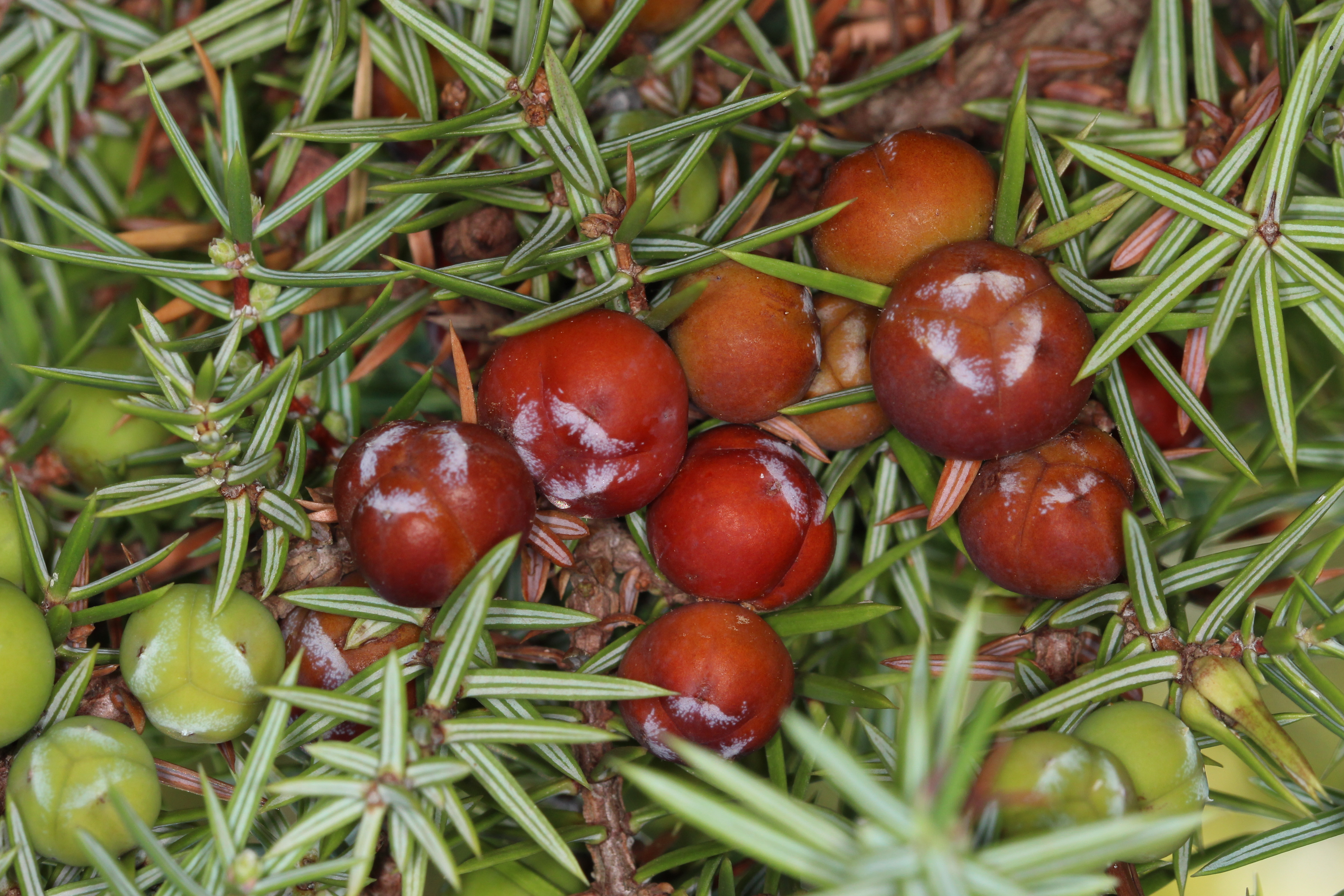

Scientific classification
- Kingdom: Plantae
- Clade: Tracheophytes
- Clade: Gymnospermae
- Division: Pinophyta
- Class: Pinopsida
- Order: Cupressales
- Family: Cupressaceae
- Genus: Juniperus
- Section: Juniperus sect. Juniperus
- Species: J. deltoides

Binomial name
- Juniperus deltoides R.P.Adams

Synonyms
- Juniperus oxycedrus subsp. deltoides (R.P.Adams) N.G.Passal.; Juniperus deltoides var. spilinana (Yalt., Eliçin & Terzioglu) Terzioglu; Juniperus deltoides f. yaltirikiana (Avci & Ziel.) R.P.Adams; Juniperus oxycedrus var. spilinana Yalt., Eliçin & Terzioglu; Juniperus oxycedrus f. yaltirikiana Avci & Ziel.

= Juniperus deltoides =

Species of plant

Juniperus deltoides (syn. Juniperus oxycedrus subsp. deltoides), the Eastern prickly juniper, is a species of juniper native to the eastern Mediterranean. Although it is sometimes considered a subspecies of Juniperus oxycedrus, phylogenetic studies have found the two are not closely related.
