= List of plants known as cedar =

Cedar is part of the English common name of many trees and other plants, particularly those of the genus Cedrus.

Some botanical authorities consider the Old-World Cedrus the only "true cedars". Many other species worldwide with similarly aromatic wood, including several species of genera Calocedrus, Thuja, and Chamaecyparis in the Pacific Northwest of North America, are referred to as "false cedars".

Plants called "cedar" include:

== Family Pinaceae ==
- Cedrus, common English name cedar, a genus of coniferous trees in the plant family Pinaceae
  - Cedrus libani, the Lebanon cedar, native to Lebanon, western Syria and south-central Turkey
  - Cedrus atlantica, the Atlas cedar, native to the Atlas Mountains of Morocco and Algeria
  - Cedrus deodara, the Deodar cedar, native to the western Himalayas
  - Cedrus brevifolia, the Cyprus cedar, found in the island of Cyprus' Cedar Valley in the Troodos Mountains
- Pinus sibirica, the Siberian pine, occasionally erroneously referred to as "Siberian cedar"

== Family Cupressaceae ==
- Atlantic white cedar, Chamaecyparis thyoides
- Bermuda cedar, Juniperus bermudiana, a species of juniper endemic to Bermuda
- Chilean cedar, Austrocedrus chilensis
- Chinese cedarwood oil comes from Cupressus funebris, the Chinese weeping cypress
- Clanwilliam cedar, Widdringtonia cedarbergensis, a species of cypress endemic to the Cederberg mountains of South Africa
- Eastern red cedar, Juniperus virginiana, a species of juniper native to eastern North America
- Eastern white cedar, also northern white cedar, Thuja occidentalis, native to eastern North America.
- Calocedrus, the incense cedars, a genus native to western North America, Eastern Asia
- Japanese cedar, Cryptomeria japonica; known as 杉 (Sugi) in Japanese
- Juniperus cedrus, Spanish: cedro de Canarias, cedro
- Mexican white cedar, Cupressus lusitanica, a species of cypress native to Mexico and Central America
- Mountain cedar, source of Texas cedarwood oil and abundant allergenic pollen, Juniperus ashei, an evergreen shrub native to northeastern Mexico and the south central United States
- New Zealand cedar, Libocedrus bidwillii
- Persian cedar, Cupressus sempervirens
- Port Orford-cedar, Chamaecyparis lawsoniana, or Lawson cypress, California, Oregon
- Prickly cedar, sharp cedar, Juniperus oxycedrus, native to the Mediterranean region
- Western red cedar, Thuja plicata, a cypress of the Pacific northwest
- Yellow cedar, Cupressus nootkatensis, also called Alaska cedar

== Family Meliaceae ==
- Spanish cedar, Cedrela odorata
- Cigar-box cedar, Cedrela
- Australian red cedar, Toona ciliata
- Ceylon cedar or Melia azedarach, a species of deciduous tree native to India, southern China and Australia

== Other families ==
- Bay cedar, Suriana (Surianaceae)
- Running cedar or ground cedar, various species of clubmosses in the genus Diphasiastrum (Lycopodiaceae)
- Saltcedar, Tamarix (Caryophyllaceae)
- Stinking cedar, Torreya taxifolia (Cephalotaxaceae)
- Warren River cedar or native cedar, Taxandria juniperina (Myrtaceae)
- White cedar, Tabebuia heterophylla (Bignoniaceae)
