= Quercus kotschyana =

Conservation status
- Endangered (IUCN 3.1)

Scientific classification
- Kingdom: Plantae
- Clade: Embryophytes
- Clade: Tracheophytes
- Clade: Spermatophytes
- Clade: Angiosperms
- Clade: Eudicots
- Clade: Rosids
- Order: Fagales
- Family: Fagaceae
- Genus: Quercus
- Subgenus: Quercus subg. Quercus
- Section: Quercus sect. Quercus
- Species: Q. kotschyana

Binomial name
- Quercus kotschyana O.Schwarz

Species of oak tree

Quercus kotschyana is a species of oak endemic to the mountains of Lebanon. It is placed in subgenus Quercus, section Quercus.

== Description and naming ==
It is a large deciduous species, attaining heights up to 25 meters. It bears large, pubescent and strongly lobed leaves and overall resembles Quercus pyrenaica from the western Mediterranean and the likewise endemic Quercus vulcanica from Turkey. It was first described by Otto Schwarz[de], who named it in honour of Theodor Kotschy, an Austrian botanist who had travelled extensively in the region.

== Range and habitat ==
Quercus kotschyana grows in the northern Lebanon Mountains, on west-facing slopes between 1,650 and 1,950 metres elevation. There are eight subpopulations in the mountains, at Danniyeh, Ehden, Bsharri, Tannourine, Jaj, Jord Akoura, Jord Keserwan, and Zaarour. The species' range is small, with an estimated extent of occurrence (EOO) of 440 km^{2}, and an estimated area of occupancy (AOO) of 32 km^{2}.

Quercus kotschyana is found in montane forests dominated by Lebanon cedar (Cedrus libani), where it grows either as an understory tree among cedars, or co-dominant in stands with other broadleaved trees. Other associated trees include Greek juniper (Juniperus excelsa), chequer tree (Torminalis glaberrima), Greek whitebeam (Aria graeca), hawthorn (Crateagus) spp., Balkan maple (Acer hyrcanum subsp. tauricolum), and Montpellier maple (Acer monspessulanum subsp. microphyllum). It is not associated with any other species of oak.

== Conservation ==
The species' range is very restricted, and there are estimated to be 5,000 mature trees, with fewer than 1,000 in the largest population. The species' population is currently stable, and is threatened with further habitat loss from climate change, logging and development, and pests and disease. Several populations, including those at Horsh Ehden, Tannourine, Bsharri, Jaj, and Danniyeh, are in protected areas which prohibit forest cutting. Most of the protected areas permit livestock grazing which can limit the trees' regeneration. Its conservation status is assessed as Endangered.
