= Crocus brachyfilus =

Scientific classification
- Kingdom: Plantae
- Clade: Tracheophytes
- Clade: Angiosperms
- Clade: Monocots
- Order: Asparagales
- Family: Iridaceae
- Genus: Crocus
- Species: C. brachyfilus

Binomial name
- Crocus brachyfilus I.Schneid.

Synonyms
- Crocus elegans (Rukšāns) Rukšāns; Crocus speciosus subsp. elegans Rukšāns

Species of flowering plant

Crocus brachyfilus, synonym Crocus elegans, is a species of flowering plant in the genus Crocus of the family Iridaceae. It is found in Turkey.

== Description ==
Crocus brachyfilus is a herbaceous perennial geophyte growing from a corm. The corm is subglobose in shape 10–12 mm in height and 10–20 mm wide. The membranous corm has dark brown tunics. The corms produce two leaves typically but sometimes one or three. The flowers opening before the leaves are produced. The hairless, 3–5 mm wide, linear leaves are green with a longitudinal white stripe. The single, fragrant, light to deep blue flower blooms in the fall. The flowers have white throats and are striped with approximately five dark blue veins. The filaments are white, hairless with deep yellow or sometimes creamy white anthers. The pollen is yellow. The styles are as long or longer than the anthers and have many slender, reddish-orange (sometimes yellow-orange) branches.

== Distribution and ecology ==
Native to Konya province in Turkey, on limestone formations at altitudes of 1700 1800 meters, in clearings of Abies cilicica woods growing with Cedrus libani and Pinus nigra var. pallasiana.

== Etymology ==
The species name "brachyfilus" refers to the short filaments (brachys means short, and filum means filament).
