= Cedrus libani var. stenocoma =

Turkish cedar

Conservation status
- Vulnerable (IUCN 3.1)

Scientific classification
- Kingdom: Plantae
- Clade: Tracheophytes
- Clade: Gymnosperms
- Division: Pinophyta
- Class: Pinopsida
- Order: Pinales
- Family: Pinaceae
- Genus: Cedrus
- Species: C. libani
- Variety: C. l. var. stenocoma

Trinomial name
- Cedrus libani var. stenocoma

Synonyms
- Cedrus libani var. stenocoma

Species of conifer

Cedrus libani var. stenocoma, the Taurus cedar, also known as the Turkish cedar, is a variety of conifer in the pine family, Pinaceae. It is native to the Taurus Mountains in southern Turkey and was considered a subspecies in some earlier literature, but is now regarded as a variety or ecotype of C. libani var. libani. It usually has a spreading crown that does not flatten. This distinct morphology is a habit assumed to cope with the competitive environment, since the tree occurs in dense stands mixed with the tall-growing Abies cilicica, or in pure stands of young cedar trees. Isozyme analysis, however, placed var. stenocoma closer to var. brevifolia than to var. libani, even placing var. brevifolia embedded within var. stenocoma samples.

== Distribution and habitat ==
Cedrus libani var. stenocoma a variant of Lebanese cedar is endemic to the Taurus Mountains in Turkey. Worldwide, the largest forests of Lebanese cedar occur in southern Turkey and cover an area of 417.188,5 ha, although relict stands can also be found in the Emirdağ Mountains of Central Turkey and near the Akıncı and Çatalan villages of the Black Sea coast, in northern Turkey.

== Cultivation ==
Cedrus libani on the western edge of the Quad, University of Washington, Seattle.

Cultivation of Lebanon cedar dates back at least 3,200 years, when the Hittite Empire established two populations of the species in northern Turkey where it did not occur naturally.

== See also ==
- Cyprus cedar
- Lebanese cedar
