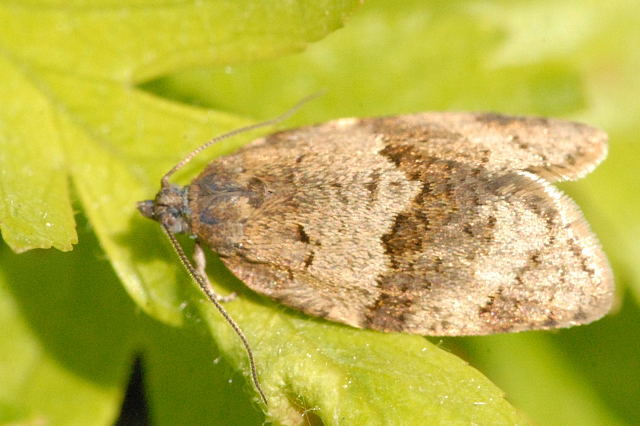
- Adult at Commanster in the Belgian Ardennes

Scientific classification
- Kingdom: Animalia
- Phylum: Arthropoda
- Clade: Pancrustacea
- Class: Insecta
- Order: Lepidoptera
- Family: Tortricidae
- Genus: Syndemis
- Species: S. musculana

Binomial name
- Syndemis musculana (Hübner, 1799)

= Syndemis musculana =

Species of moth

The name of the present species was misapplied to S. afflictana by Baron Walsingham in 1879.

Syndemis musculana is a moth of the family Tortricidae. It is found in Europe, China (Heilongjiang, Jilin, Inner Mongolia), the Korean Peninsula, Japan, Russia (Amur) and North America.

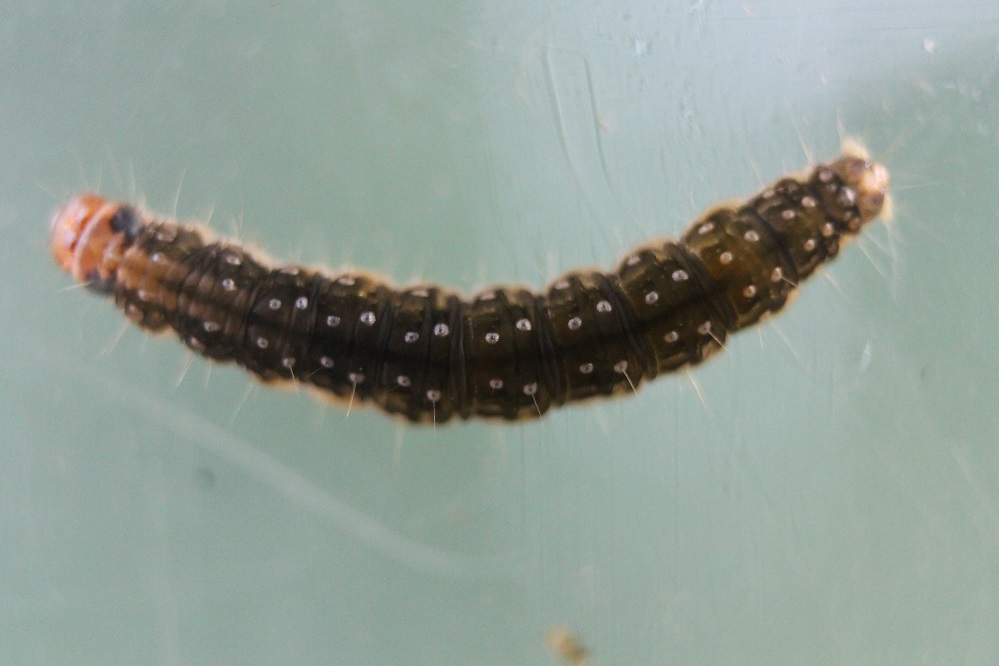
Larva

The wingspan is 15–22 mm. The species lacks striking patterns and is also quite variable in colour, thus it is not easy to determine. The head, thoracic and forewing are more or less brownish grey. The forewing has a more or less distinct, wide, brown cross-band in the middle. The hindwings are light grey-brown.

The adults fly from April to July in the temperate parts of their range, such as Belgium and the Netherlands.

The caterpillars feed on oaks (Quercus), birches (Betula), spruces (Picea), ragworts (Senecio) and Rubus (brambles and allies). Less usually, they have been recorded to eat plant refuse and dry leaves.

== Synonyms ==
Obsolete scientific names of this species are:

- Cacoecia musculana (Hübner, 1799)
- Syndemis musculana nipponensis Yasuda, 1975
- Tortrix musculana Hübner, 1799
- Tortrix musculinana (lapsus)
- Tortrix obsoletana Strand, 1901
