= Syndemis plumosa =

Scientific classification
- Domain: Eukaryota
- Kingdom: Animalia
- Phylum: Arthropoda
- Class: Insecta
- Order: Lepidoptera
- Family: Tortricidae
- Genus: Syndemis
- Species: S. plumosa

Binomial name
- Syndemis plumosa Diakonoff, 1953

Species of moth

Syndemis plumosa is a species of moth of the family Tortricidae. It is found on New Guinea.
