= Syndemis erythrothorax =

Scientific classification
- Domain: Eukaryota
- Kingdom: Animalia
- Phylum: Arthropoda
- Class: Insecta
- Order: Lepidoptera
- Family: Tortricidae
- Genus: Syndemis
- Species: S. erythrothorax

Binomial name
- Syndemis erythrothorax Diakonoff, 1944

Species of moth

Syndemis erythrothorax is a species of moth of the family Tortricidae. It is found on New Guinea.
