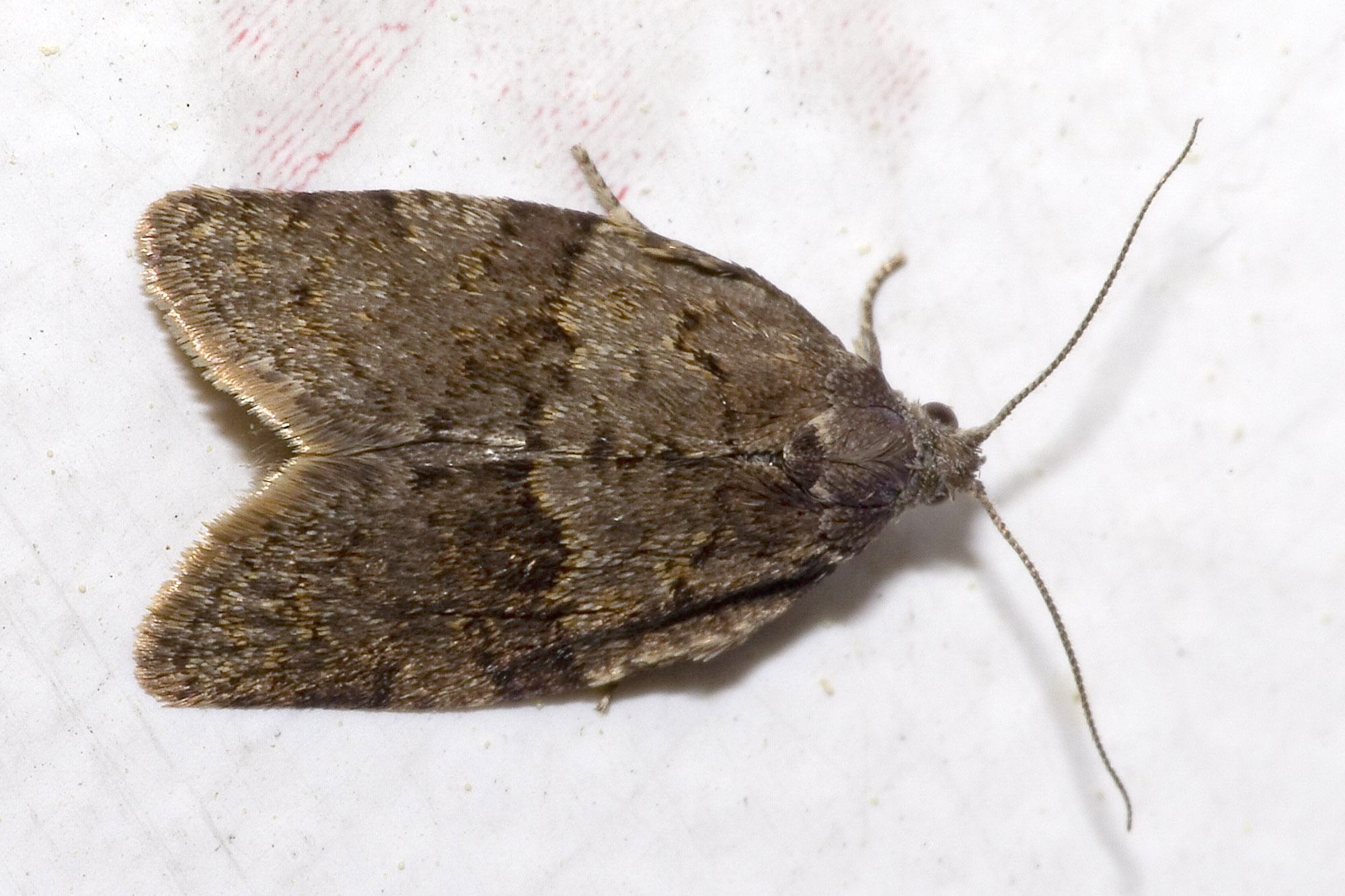
- Adult S. musculana in Dresden (Saxony, Germany)

Scientific classification
- Kingdom: Animalia
- Phylum: Arthropoda
- Clade: Pancrustacea
- Class: Insecta
- Order: Lepidoptera
- Family: Tortricidae
- Tribe: Archipini
- Genus: Syndemis; Hübner, 1825

= Syndemis =

Genus of tortrix moths

Syndemis is a genus of tortrix moths (Tortricidae). They are placed in the subfamily Tortricinae, and therein in the tribe Archipini of which they are the type genus.

== Species ==
- Syndemis afflictana (Walker, 1863)
- Syndemis cedricola (Diakonoff, 1974)
- Syndemis duplex Diakonoff, 1948
- Syndemis erythrothorax Diakonoff, 1944
- Syndemis labyrinthodes Diakonoff, 1956
- Syndemis miae Diakonoff, 1948
- Syndemis musculana
- Syndemis plumosa Diakonoff, 1953
- Syndemis supervacanea Razowski, 1984
- Syndemis xanthopterana Kostyuk, 1980
