= Syndemis miae =

Scientific classification
- Kingdom: Animalia
- Phylum: Arthropoda
- Class: Insecta
- Order: Lepidoptera
- Family: Tortricidae
- Genus: Syndemis
- Species: S. miae

Binomial name
- Syndemis miae Diakonoff, 1948

Species of moth

Syndemis miae is a species of moth of the family Tortricidae. It is found on Java in Indonesia.
