= Horsh Ehden =

Nature reserve in Lebanon

Coordinates: 34°18′30″N 35°58′59″E

Horsh Ehden Nature Reserve
- IUCN category Ib (wilderness area)
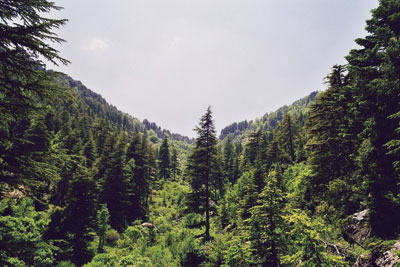
- Interactive map of Horsh Ehden Nature Reserve
- Nearest city: Ehden
- Area: 17.4 km^{2} (6.7 sq mi)
- Established: 9 March 1992
- Governing body: Horsh Ehden Nature Reserve Committee, Lebanese ministry of the environment

Horsh Ehden Nature Reserve logo.

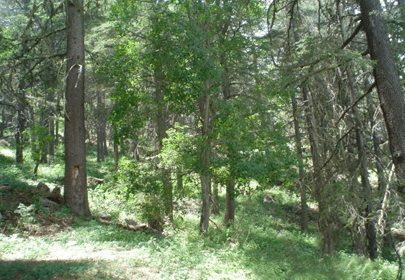
Inside the reserve.

Horsh Ehden is a nature reserve located in Northern Lebanon. It contains a forest of the cedar of Lebanon, making it a part of the country's cultural and natural heritage. It is located on the northwestern slopes of Mount Lebanon, the nature reserve experiences high precipitation and is home to numerous rare and endemic plants. Stands of cedars also include a mixed forest of juniper, fir, and the country's last protected community of wild apple trees. In the forest are endangered eastern imperial eagles or Bonelli's eagles, gray wolves, wildcats, golden jackals, and red foxes. Valleys and gorges also have wild orchids, salamanders, mushrooms, and other flora and fauna.

== Natural history ==
=== Biodiversity ===
Over 1,058 plant species have been identified in the reserve, accounting for nearly 40% of all native plant species in Lebanon, though the reserve represents less than 0.1% of the total area of Lebanon. The forests form an assemblage of conifers, deciduous, and evergreen broadleaf trees in an isolated climatic phytochorion with a varied topography.

=== Flora ===
1,020 species of native plants and 39 species of native trees have been identified. Seventy species use "Lebanon" in their names, such as Cedrus libani, Salix libanii, and Berberis libanotica. Twenty-two other species carry names significant to Lebanon, such as Dianthus karami (after Youssef Bey Karam, a 19th-century national figure), and Astragalus ehdenensis (after the village of Ehden). A total of 212 (20%) species are rare and another 126 (12%) are considered threatened; 115 are endemic to Lebanon, and ten are endemic to Horsh Ehden. Seventy-eight species are recognized as medicinal plants. The reserve is also considered the southernmost limit to Cilician fir (Abies cilicica).

==== Plant communities ====
The forest plant communities of highest conservation importance are:

- Lebanon cedar (Cedrus libani var. libanii), which represents about 20% of the remaining cedar forests in Lebanon,
- Cilician fir (Abies cilicica),
- Greek juniper (Juniperus excelsa), which is a gene pool for possible reforestation projects at higher altitudes, including the peaks of Mount Lebanon above 2000 m.
- Lebanese wild apple (Malus trilobata).
- Kotschy oak (Quercus kotschyana)

Horsh Ehden is the only protected area in Lebanon that contains a community of the wild apple of Lebanon.

Lebanon cedar (Cedrus libani var. libanii)

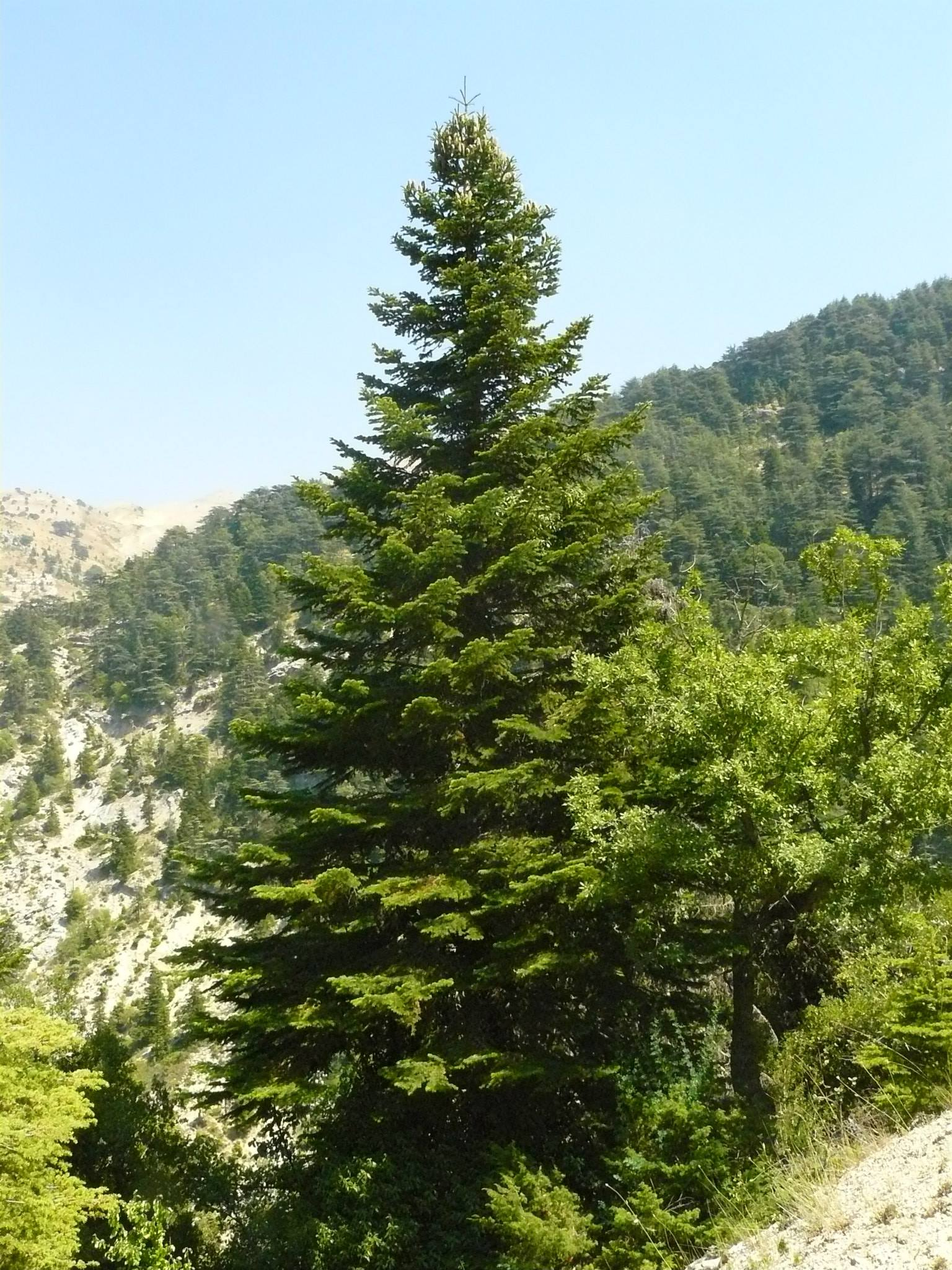
Cilician fir (Abies cilicica)

Lebanese wild apple (Malus trilobata)

Greek juniper (Juniperus excelsa)

=== Fauna ===
==== Mammals ====
More than 27 species of mammals have been sighted in the reserve, representing a third of Lebanese mammals. Insectivores, carnivores, rodents, lagomorpha, chiroptera, and artiodactyls have all been identified in the reserve.

13 species are globally threatened, one species is locally threatened and highly endangered (the gray wolf, Canis lupus), and one species is endemic to the reserve (the lesser white-toothed shrew, Crocidura suaveolens).

Species identified in the reserve include Cape hare (Lepus capensis), wood mouse (Apodemus sylvaticus), Eurasian badger (Meles meles), southern white-breasted hedgehog (Erinaceus concolor), Indian porcupine (Histrix indica), Caucasian squirrel (Sciurus anomalus), striped hyena (Hyaena hyanena), least weasel (Mustela nivalis), wildcat (Felis silvestris), gray wolf (Canis lupus), and marbled polecat (Vormela Peregusna).

Caucasian squirrel

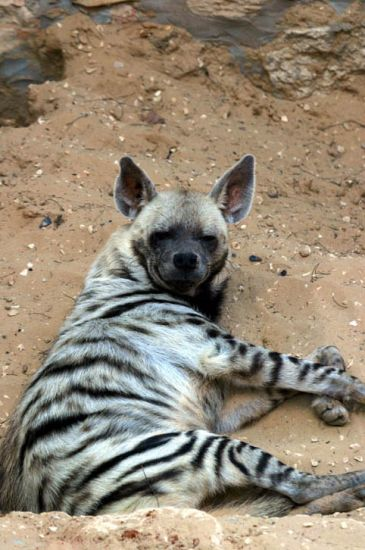
Striped hyena

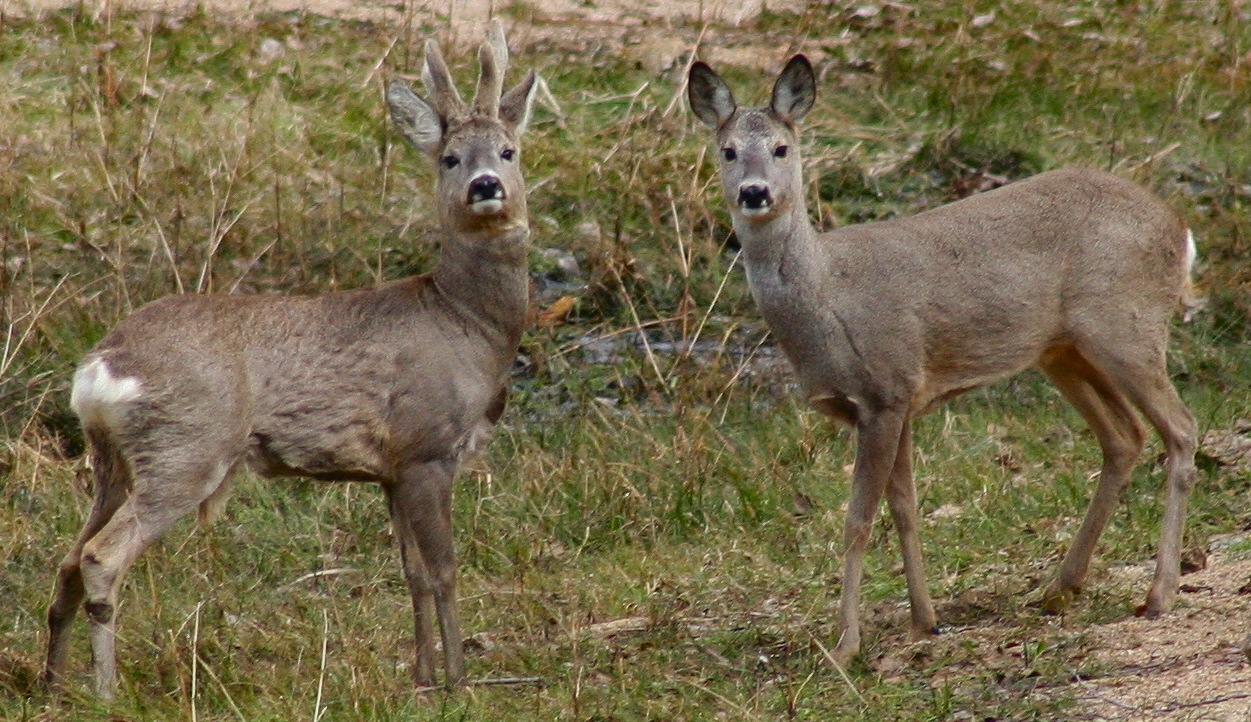
Roe deer (male and female)

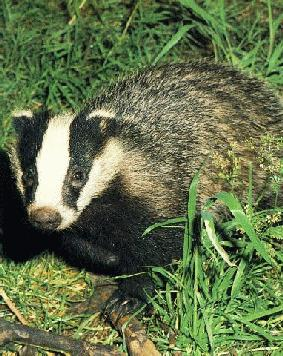
Eurasian badger

==== Birds ====
The reserve has different birds habitats. Four of the identified bird species are globally threatened, five are regionally vulnerable, eighteen face unfavorable conditions in Europe, and fifty-seven are rare in Lebanon.

Species include eastern imperial eagle (Aquila heliaca), Bonelli's eagle (Hieraaetus fasciatus), blue tit (Parus caeruleus), corn crake (Crex crex), Levant sparrowhawk (Accipiter brevipes), saker falcon (Falco cherrug), white pelican (Pelecanus onocratalus), black stork (Ciconia nigra), Egyptian vulture (Neophron perenopetrus), European bee-eater (Merops apiaster), sand martin (Riparia riparia), white stork (Ciconia ciconia), common wood-pigeon (Columba polumbus), great spotted cuckoo (Clamator glandarius), barn owl (Tyto alba), and the Syrian woodpecker (Dendrocopos syriacus).

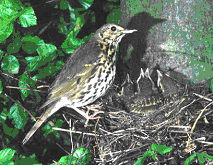
Song thrush

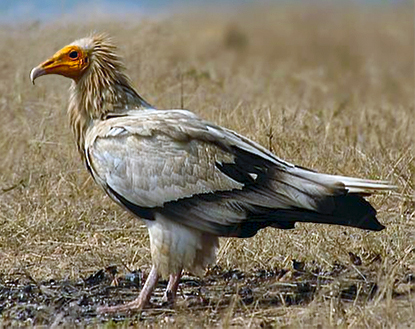
Egyptian vulture

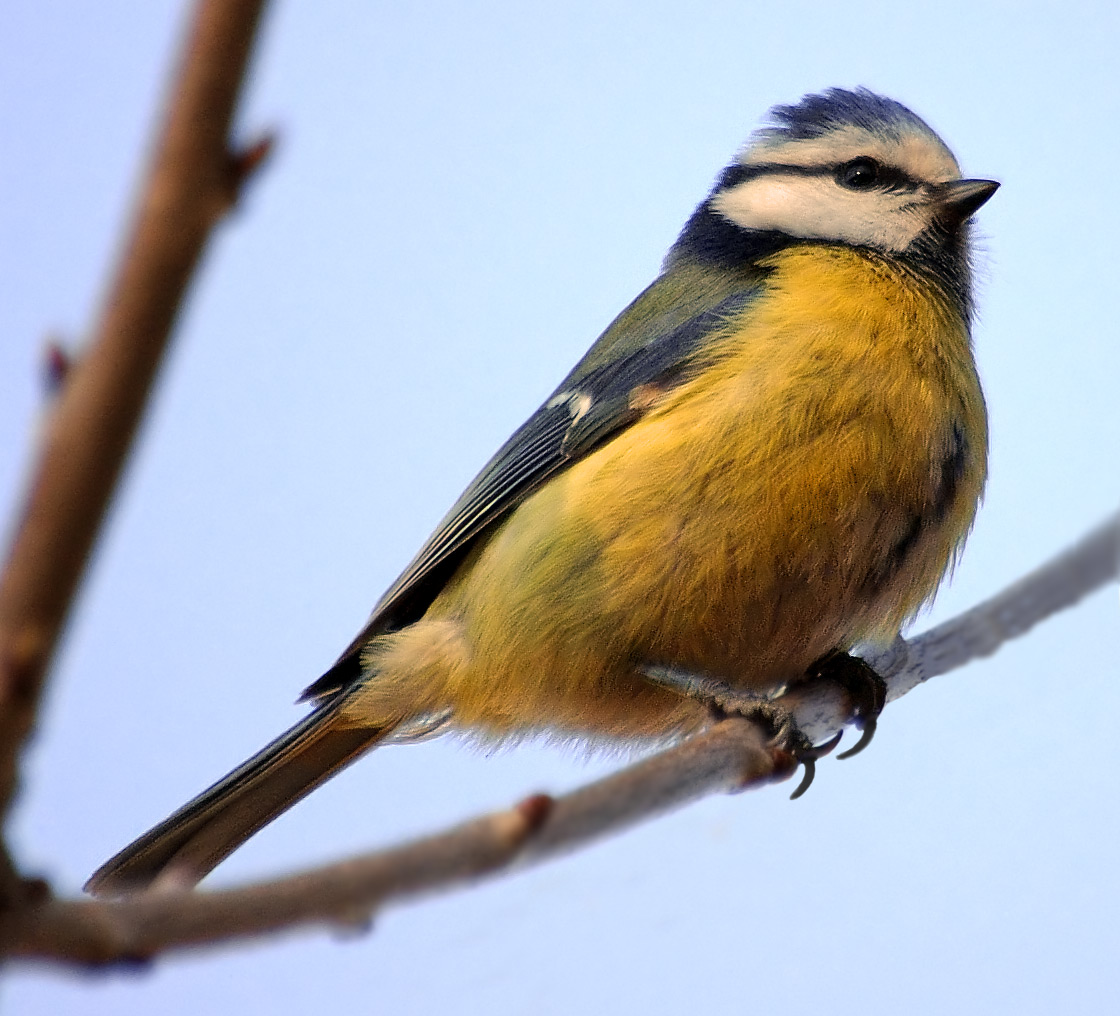
Eurasian blue tit

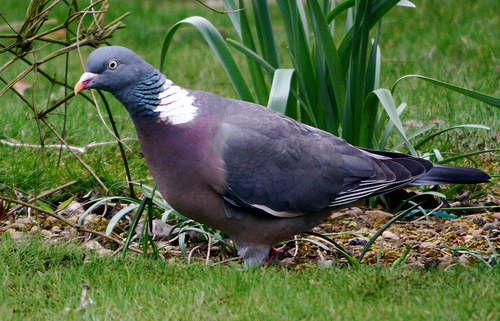
Common wood-pigeon

==== Amphibians and reptiles ====
There are four species of amphibians and nineteen species of reptiles. One species (Mediterranean chameleon, Chamaeleo chamaeleon) is globally threatened, one subspecies is unique, and nineteen species are threatened in Lebanon.

Species include Lebanon viper (Montivipera bornmuelleri), Palestinian viper (Vipera palaestinae), green whip snake (Hierophis viridiflavus), bridled mabuya (Trachylepis vittata), Schreiber's fringe-fingered lizard (Acanthodactylus schreiberi), desert black snake (Walterinnesia aegyptia), common toad (Bufo bufo).

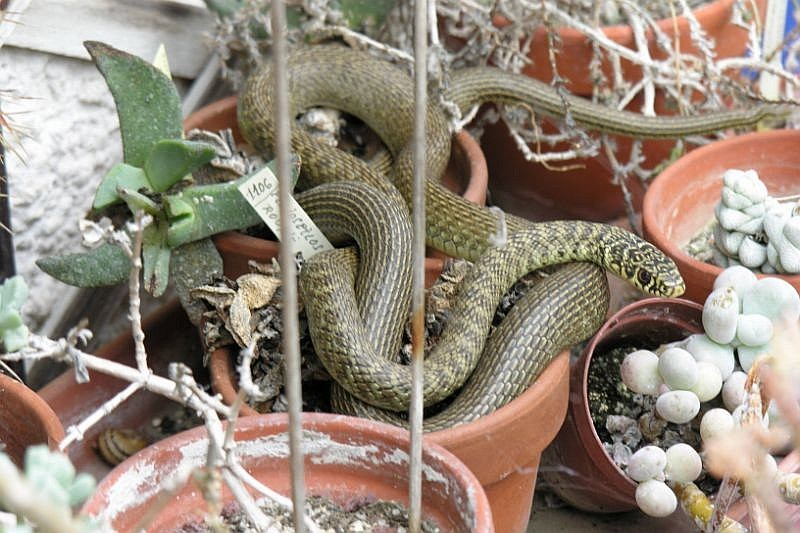
Green whip snake

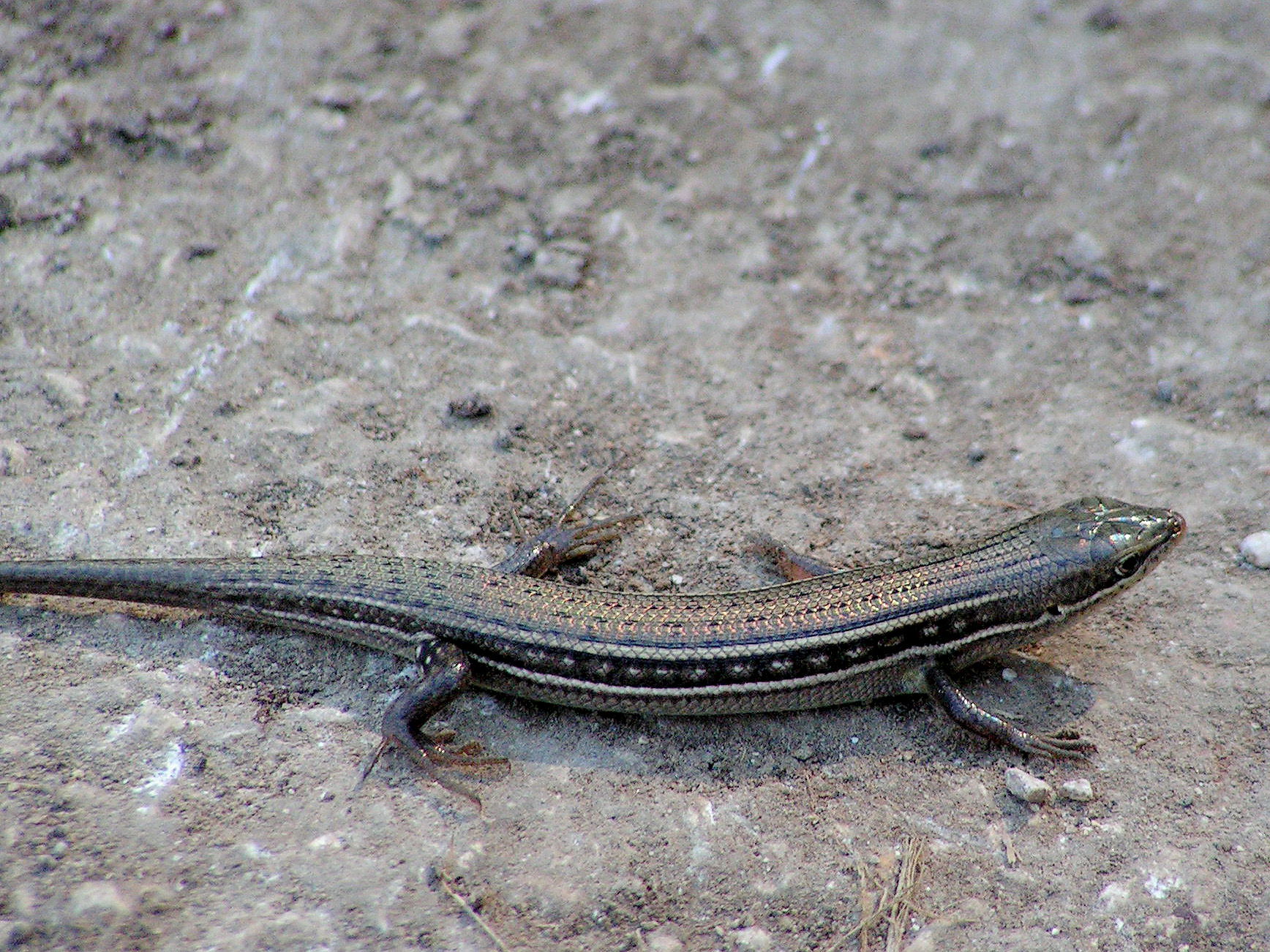
Bridled mabuya

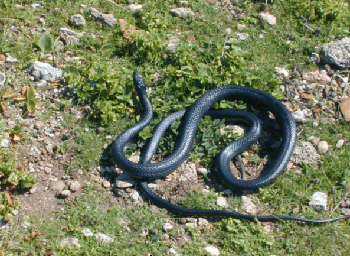
Desert black snake

Common toad

== See also ==
- Al Shouf Cedar Nature Reserve
- Aammiq Wetland
- Palm Islands Nature Reserve
