= Syndemis supervacanea =

Scientific classification
- Kingdom: Animalia
- Phylum: Arthropoda
- Class: Insecta
- Order: Lepidoptera
- Family: Tortricidae
- Genus: Syndemis
- Species: S. supervacanea

Binomial name
- Syndemis supervacanea Razowski, 1984

Species of moth

Syndemis supervacanea is a species of moth of the family Tortricidae. It is found in Shanxi, China.
