= Syndemis cedricola =

Scientific classification
- Domain: Eukaryota
- Kingdom: Animalia
- Phylum: Arthropoda
- Class: Insecta
- Order: Lepidoptera
- Family: Tortricidae
- Genus: Syndemis
- Species: S. cedricola

Binomial name
- Syndemis cedricola (Diakonoff, 1974)

Synonyms
- Parasyndemis cedricola Diakonoff, 1974; Dichelia cedricola

Species of moth

Syndemis cedricola, the Lebanese cedar shoot moth, is a species of moth of the family Tortricidae. It is found in Lebanon and Turkey.

The wingspan is 15–19 mm.

The larvae feed on Cedrus libani, causing damage to the leaves and buds. Larvae are active from April to May and in November.
