= Syndemis xanthopterana =

Scientific classification
- Domain: Eukaryota
- Kingdom: Animalia
- Phylum: Arthropoda
- Class: Insecta
- Order: Lepidoptera
- Family: Tortricidae
- Genus: Syndemis
- Species: S. xanthopterana

Binomial name
- Syndemis xanthopterana Kostyuk, 1980

Species of moth

Syndemis xanthopterana is a species of moth of the family Tortricidae. It is found in Azerbaijan.
