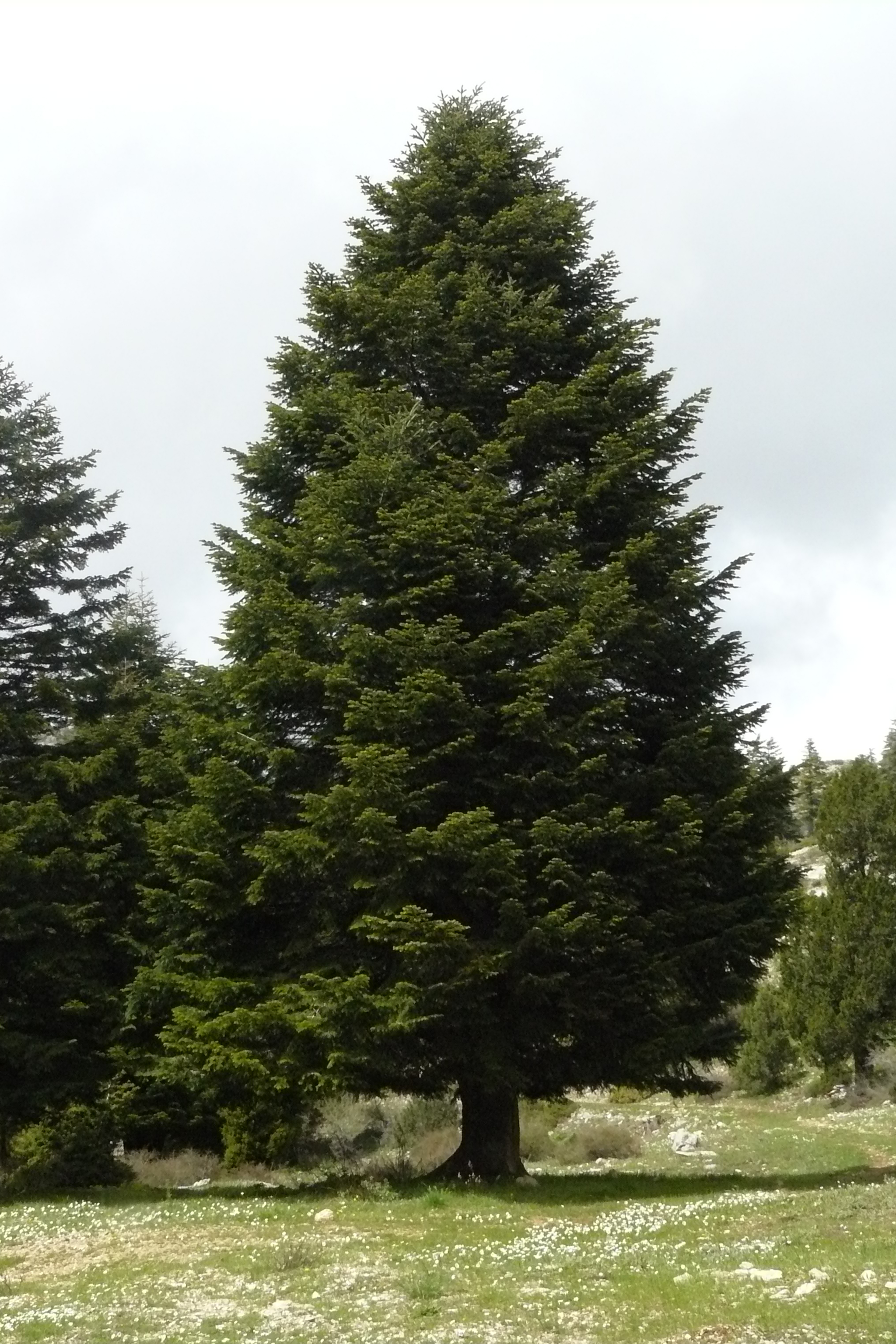
- Cilician fir in north Lebanon

Conservation status
- Near Threatened (IUCN 3.1)

Scientific classification
- Kingdom: Plantae
- Clade: Embryophytes
- Clade: Tracheophytes
- Clade: Spermatophytes
- Clade: Gymnosperms
- Division: Pinophyta
- Class: Pinopsida
- Order: Pinales
- Family: Pinaceae
- Genus: Abies
- Species: A. cilicica

Binomial name
- Abies cilicica (Antoine & Kotschy) Carrière
- Continuous range ✖ Isolated population

Synonyms
- Picea cilicica (Antoine & Kotschy) Rauch. ex Gordon; Pinus cilicica Antoine & Kotschy; Abies cilicica var. isaurica (Coode & Cullen) Silba; Abies cilicica subsp. isaurica Coode & Cullen; Abies cilicica var. pyramidalis Boydak & Erdórul; Abies kotschyana Fenzl ex Tchich.; Abies rinzii Gordon; Abies selinusia Carrière; Abies tchugatskoi P.Lawson ex Gordon; Pinus tchugatskoi Fisch. ex Henkel & Hochst.

= Abies cilicica =

Cilician fir

Species of conifer

Abies cilicica, also known as Cilician fir or Taurus fir, is a species of conifer in the family Pinaceae. It is found mainly in southern Turkey, and in a lesser measure in Lebanon and Syria. Abies cilicica and Cedrus libani, together with Acer hyrcanum subsp. tauricolum and Sorbus torminalis subsp. orientalis, are the predominant trees in the phytocoenosis Abeti-Cedrion, a type of forest of the middle and eastern Taurus Mountains of Turkey. These forests occur between 800 and 2,100 metres elevation. Over 5,000 years of logging, burning, and grazing have reduced these forests to enclaves.

In 2009 at Berenice Troglodytica, the Egypto-Roman port on the Red Sea, archaeologists found: "two blocks of resin from the Syrian fir tree (Abies cilicica), one weighing about 190 g and the other about 339 g, recovered from 1st-century AD contexts in one of the harbour trenches. Produced in areas of greater Syria and Asia Minor, this resin and its oil derivative were used in mummification, as an antiseptic, a diuretic, to treat wrinkles, extract worms and promote hair growth."

The Cilician fir is a significant source of timber in Turkey, where it is relatively common; it is primarily used for plywood for construction. It is not commonly cultivated, however, because of its susceptibility to late frost in early spring.

== Gallery ==
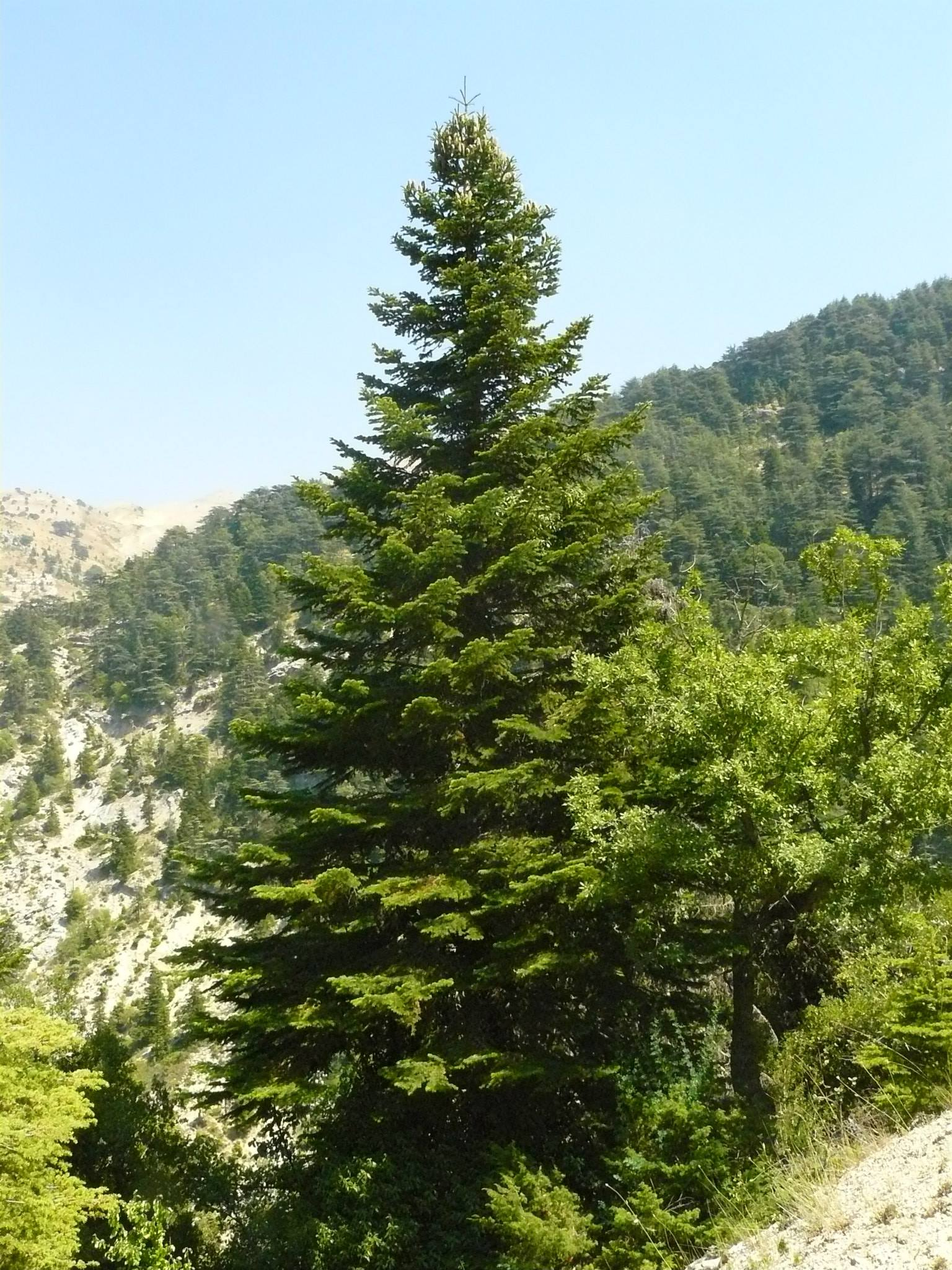
Abies cilicica in the Horsh Ehden reserve, Lebanon

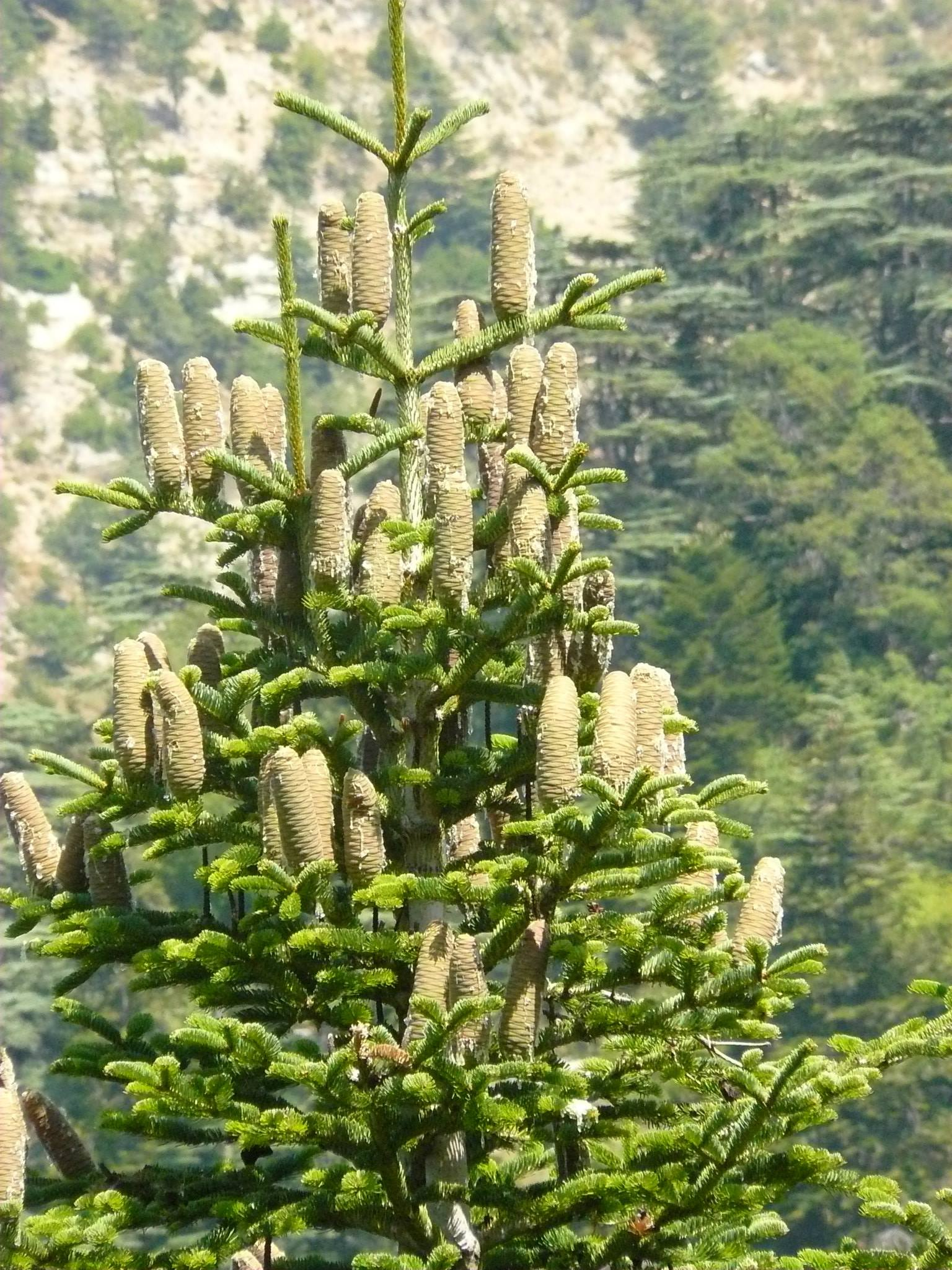
Abies cillicica cones

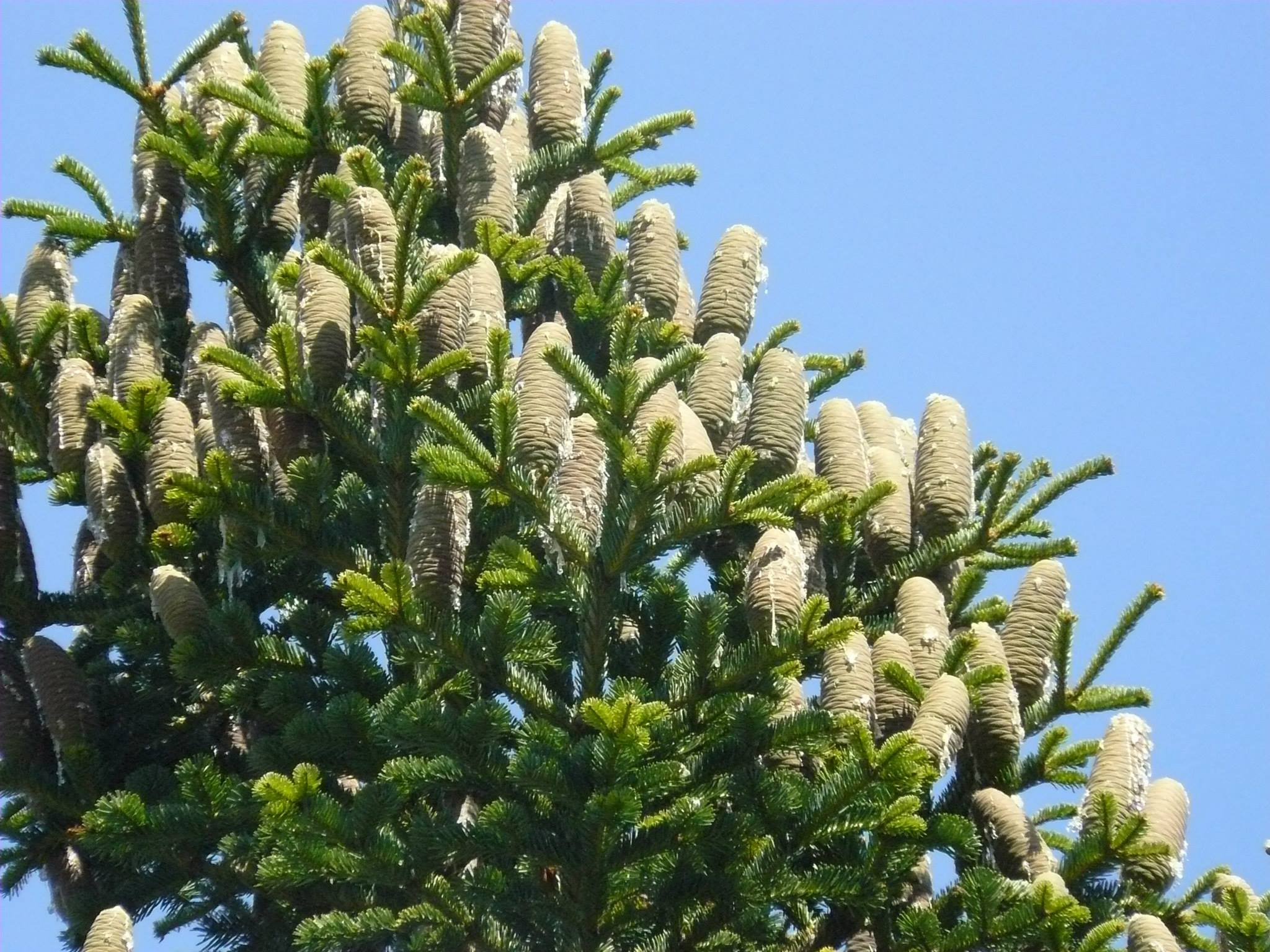
Abies cilicica, close-up
