= Cedar Valley (Cyprus) =

Coordinates: 35.031°N 32.658°E

Cedar Valley (Greek: Κοιλάδα Kέδρων) is a valley in the Troodos Mountains of central Cyprus on the southern slope of Mount Tripylos. It is named for the Cyprus cedar, Cedrus brevifolia prevalent there. The valley has been designated a Natura 2000 site.
