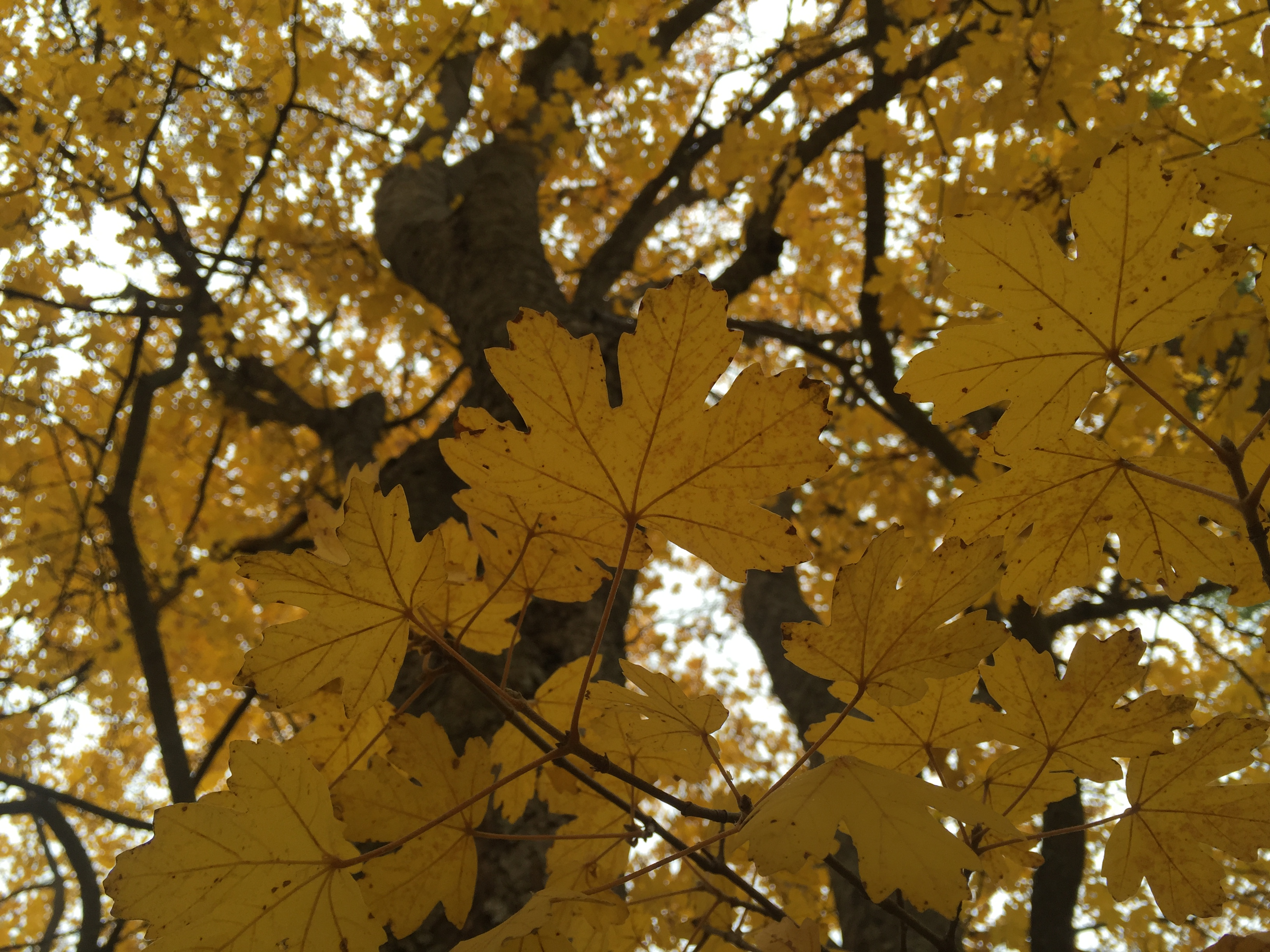
- Taurus maple (Acer hyrcanum subsp. tauricolum) in Autumn, Horsh Ehden Nature Reserve, Lebanon.
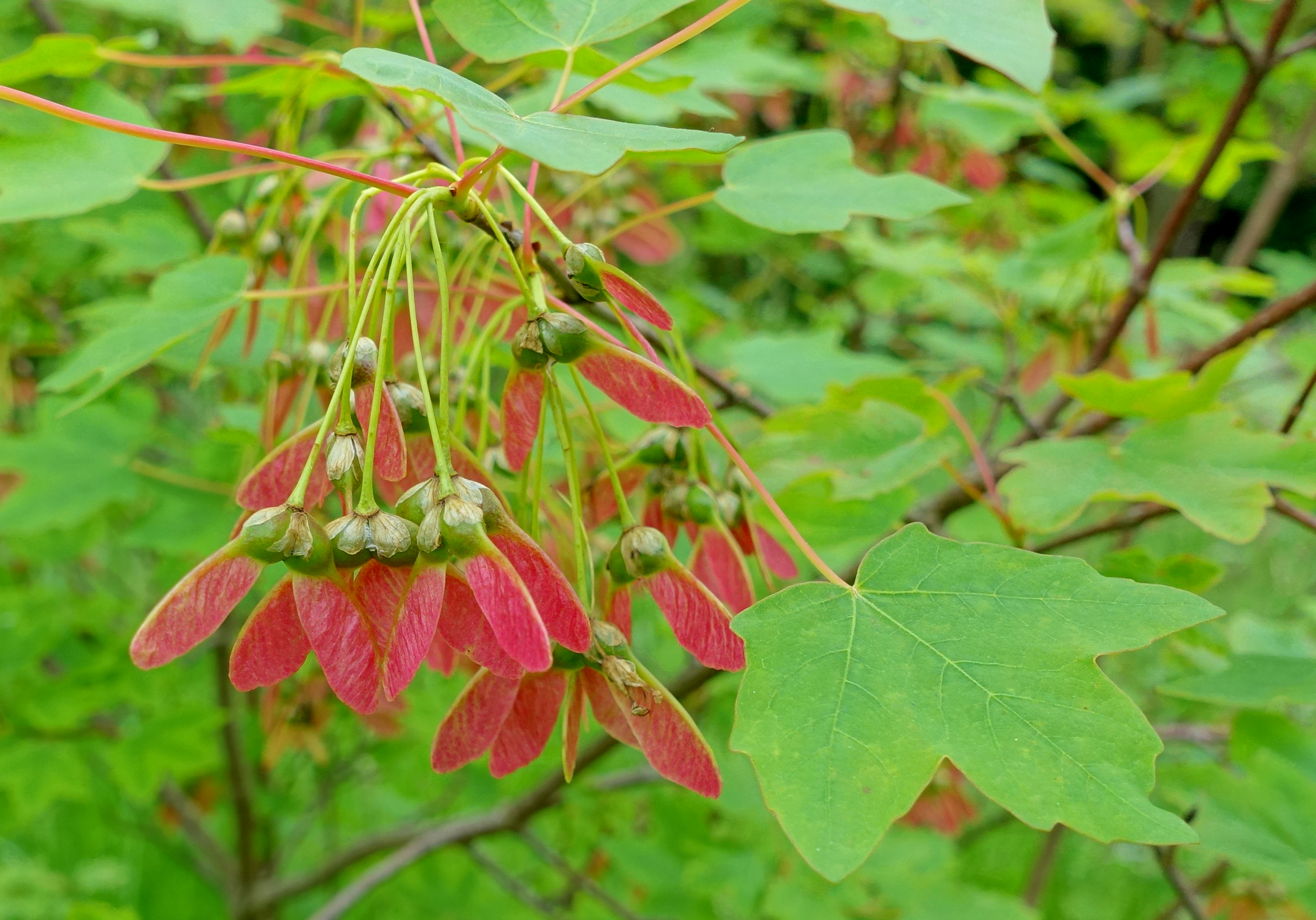

Scientific classification
- Kingdom: Plantae
- Clade: Tracheophytes
- Clade: Angiosperms
- Clade: Eudicots
- Clade: Rosids
- Order: Sapindales
- Family: Sapindaceae
- Genus: Acer
- Section: Acer sect. Acer
- Series: Acer ser. Monspessulana
- Species: A. hyrcanum

Binomial name
- Acer hyrcanum Fisch. & C.A.Mey. 1838
- Distribution

Synonyms
- List: Acer amaliae Orph. ex Boiss.; Acer hyrcanum var. paradoxum Bornm. & Sint.; Acer italum var. hyrcanum (Fisch. & C.A.Mey.) Pax; Acer italum subsp. hyrcanum (Fisch. & C.A.Mey.) Pax; Acer italum var. serbicum Pax; Acer italum f. serbicum (Pax) Schwer.; Acer monspessulanum var. lycicum Bornm.; Acer opalus subsp. hyrcanum (Fisch. & C.A.Mey.) A.E.Murray; Acer opalus var. paradoxum (Bornm. & Sint.) A.E.Murray; Acer intermedium Pančić; Acer keckianum (Asch. & Sint. ex Pax) Asch. & Sint. ex Pojark.; Acer reginae-amaliae Orph. ex Boiss.; Acer stevenii Pojark.; Acer libani Pojark.; Acer reygassei Boiss. & Blanche; Acer tauricolum Boiss. & Balansa

= Acer hyrcanum =

Species of maple

Acer hyrcanum is a maple species sometimes referred to as Balkan maple. It grows in southeastern Europe and western Asia.

== Description ==
Acer hyrcanum is a deciduous tree up to 15 metres (49 feet) tall. Leaves are up to 4 cm (1.6 in) across, usually 5-lobed but occasionally with only 3 lobes, dark green on top, lighter green underneath because of a layer of wax. The flowers open in early spring and are greenish-yellow in color, arranged in short-stalked corymbs. The fruits are hairless samaras, up to 3 cm (1.2 in) long. The grayish-brown bark fissures irregularly when old.

== Uses ==
Most of the subspecies of Acer hyrcanum are grown in cultivation.

== Subspecies ==
List of subspecies of Acer hyrcanum:

- Acer hyrcanum subsp. hyrcanum - Armenia; Azerbaijan, Turkey, Iran
- Acer hyrcanum subsp. intermedium (Pančić) Palam. - Albania; Bulgaria; Former Yugoslavia; Greece
- Acer hyrcanum subsp. keckianum (Asch. & Sint. ex Pax) Yalt. - Turkey
- Acer hyrcanum subsp. reginae-amaliae (Orph. ex Boiss.) E.Murray - Greece
- Acer hyrcanum subsp. sphaerocaryum Yalt. - Turkey
- Acer hyrcanum subsp. stevenii (Pojark.) E.Murray - Crimea
- Acer hyrcanum subsp. tauricolum (Boiss. & Balansa) Yalt. - Lebanon; Syria; Turkey
