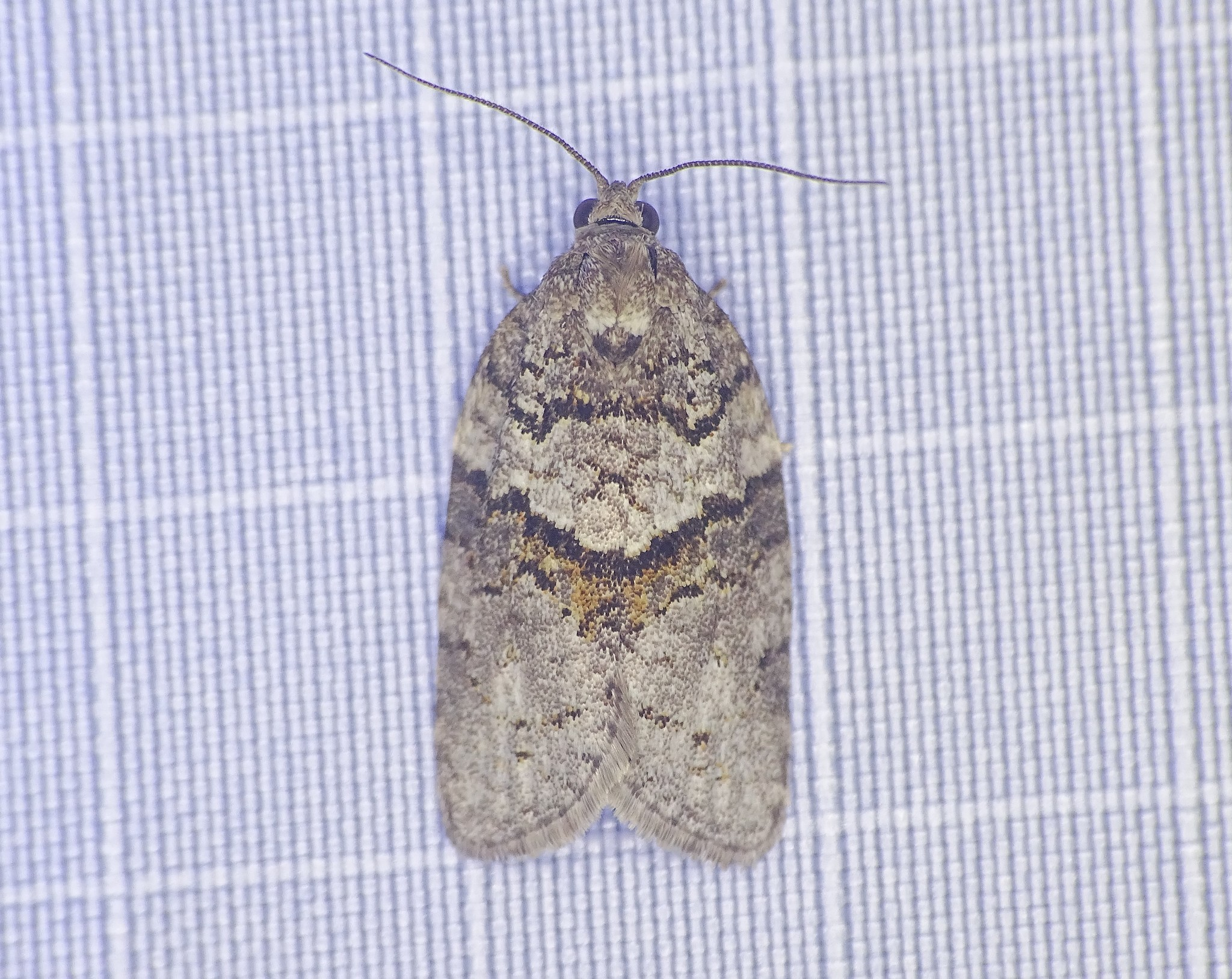

Scientific classification
- Kingdom: Animalia
- Phylum: Arthropoda
- Class: Insecta
- Order: Lepidoptera
- Family: Tortricidae
- Genus: Syndemis
- Species: S. afflictana

Binomial name
- Syndemis afflictana (Walker, 1863)

Synonyms
- Sciaphila afflictana Walker, 1863; Lozotaenia fuscolineana Clemens, 1865

= Syndemis afflictana =

Species of moth

Syndemis afflictana, the gray leafroller, dead leaf roller or black-and-gray banded leafroller, is a species of moth of the family Tortricidae. It is found in North America, where it has been recorded from southern Canada and the northern United States. In the west, the range extends south in the mountains to California. The species is also present in Florida. The habitat consists of coniferous forests.

The wingspan is 18–23 mm.
