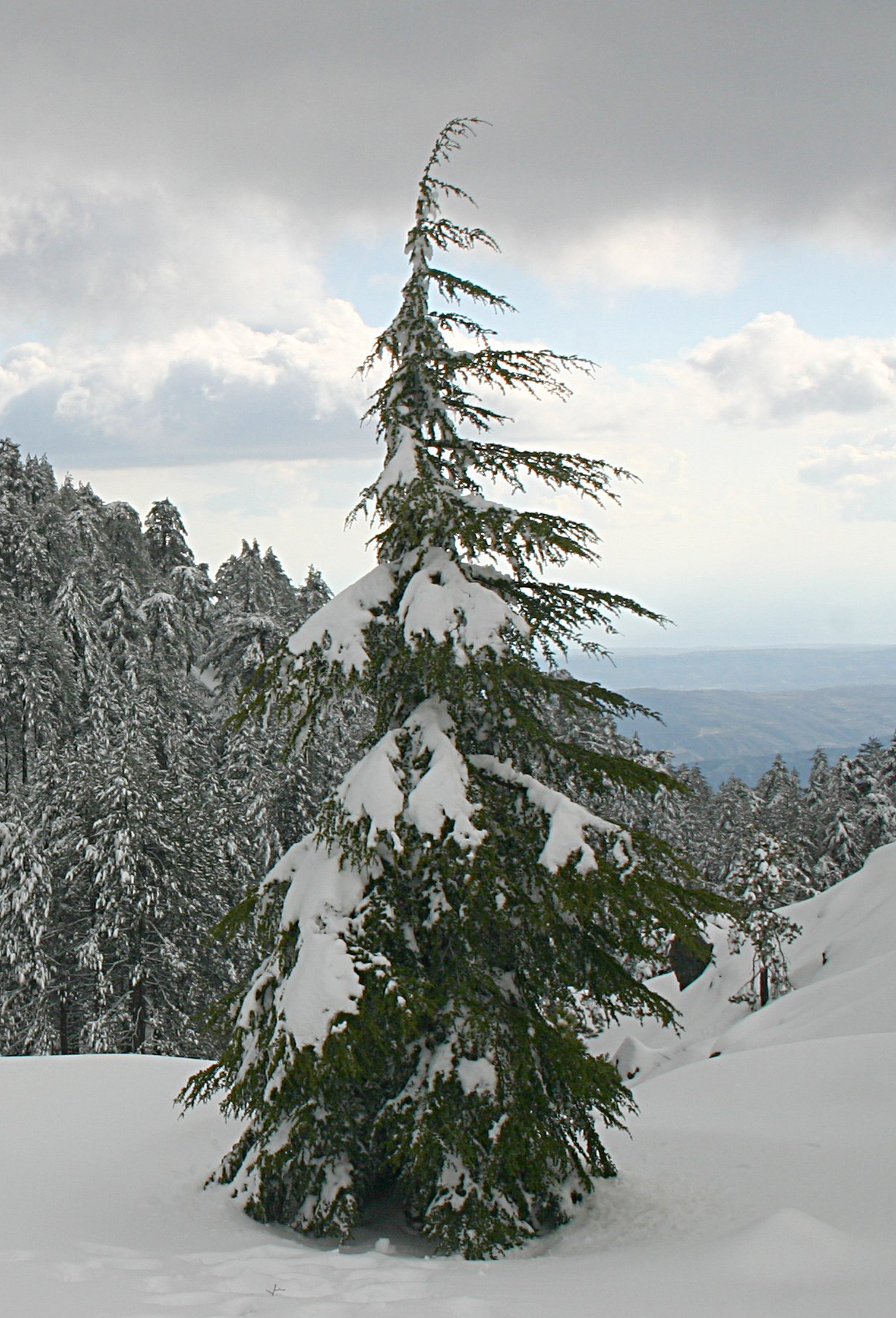
- A young tree in Cyprus

Conservation status
- Vulnerable (IUCN 3.1)

Scientific classification
- Kingdom: Plantae
- Clade: Tracheophytes
- Clade: Gymnosperms
- Division: Pinophyta
- Class: Pinopsida
- Order: Pinales
- Family: Pinaceae
- Genus: Cedrus
- Species: C. libani
- Variety: C. l. var. brevifolia

Trinomial name
- Cedrus libani var. brevifolia Hook.f.

Synonyms
- Cedrus brevifolia (Hook.f.) Elwes & A.Henry (1908); Cedrus libani subsp. brevifolia (Hook.f.) Meikle (1977); Cedrus libanitica subsp. brevifolia (Hook.f.) O.Schwarz (1944); Cedrus libanotica subsp. brevifolia (Hook.f.) Holmboe (1914)

= Cedrus libani var. brevifolia =

Cyprus cedar

Species of conifer

Cedrus libani var. brevifolia, the Cyprus cedar, is a variety of Lebanon cedar. It is a conifer in the pine family, Pinaceae. It is native to the Troödos Mountains of central Cyprus. It grows in the Cedar Valley in Pafos State Forest, in monotypic forest stands, particularly on mountain tops, and often in mixed forest stands with Pinus brutia, Quercus alnifolia, and Platanus orientalis, from 800 to 1,400 metres elevation. It is known from five natural stands – Tripylos, Mauroi Kremoi, Sellae tis Ellias, Throni, and Exo Milos. The largest stand at Tripylos was inventoried at 2 km^{2} and 16,000 mature individuals with diameter at breast height (DBH) of 12 cm or greater. The IUCN Red List assesses the variety as Vulnerable.

The tree is considered by some botanists to be a variety of the Cedrus libani (cedar of Lebanon), and by others as a separate species Cedrus brevifolia, or as a subspecies, Cedrus libani subsp. brevifolia.
