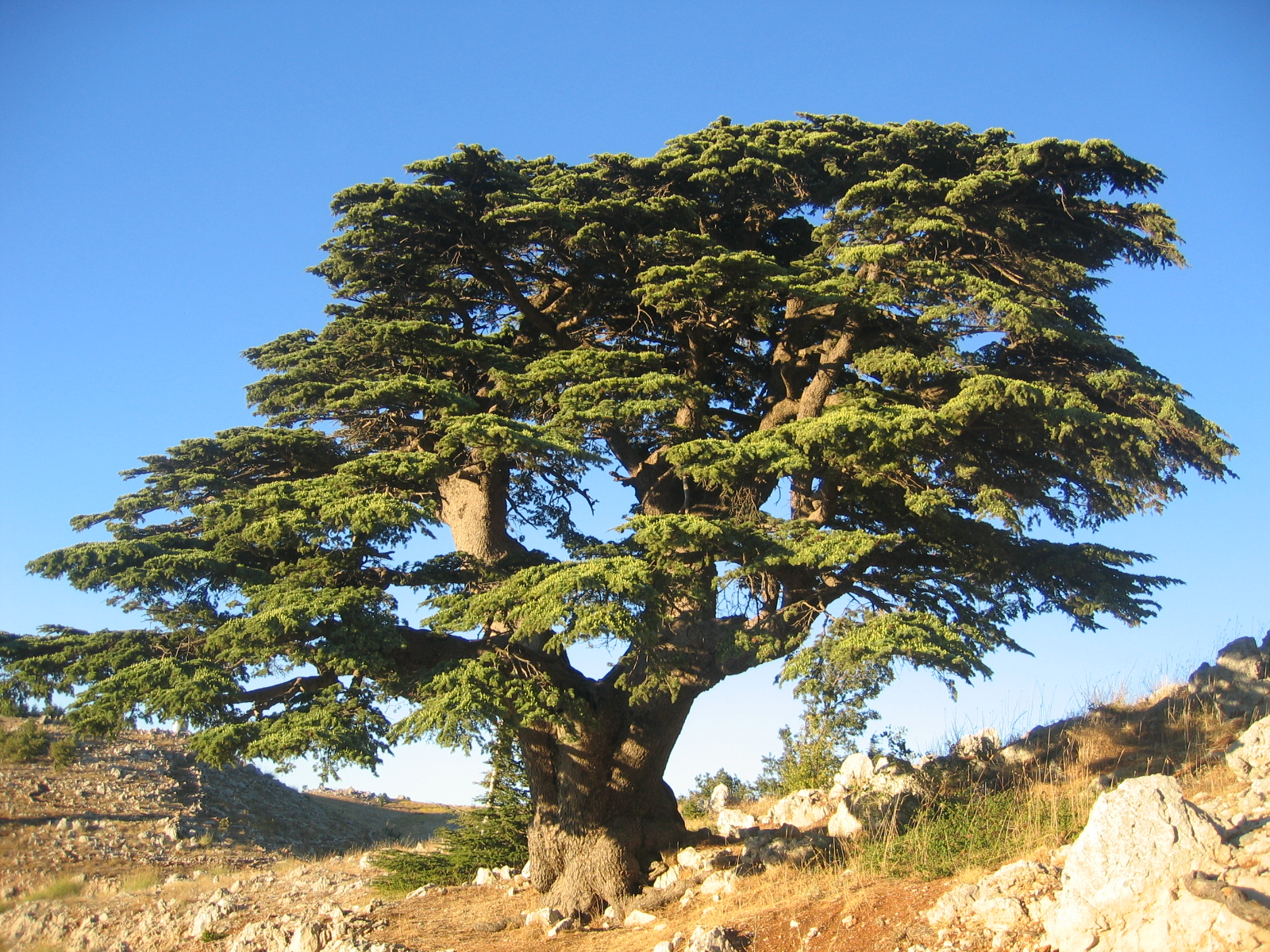
- Cedrus libani var. libani in Al Shouf Cedar Nature Reserve

Conservation status
- Vulnerable (IUCN 3.1)

Scientific classification
- Kingdom: Plantae
- Clade: Tracheophytes
- Clade: Gymnosperms
- Division: Pinophyta
- Class: Pinopsida
- Order: Pinales
- Family: Pinaceae
- Genus: Cedrus
- Species: C. libani

Binomial name
- Cedrus libani A.Rich. (1823)

Varieties
- Cedrus libani var. libani; Cedrus libani var. brevifolia; Cedrus libani var. stenocoma
- Native range ✖ Isolated population (var. libani) ✖ var. brevifolia (syn. Cedrus brevifolia)

Synonyms
- Synonymy: Abies cedrus (L.) J.St.-Hil. (1805); Cedrus cedrus (L.) Huth (1893), not validly publ.; Cedrus effusa (Salisb.) Voss (1907), nom. superfl.; Cedrus libanitica Trew ex Pilg. (1926), nom. superfl.; Cedrus libanitica subsp. libani (A.Rich.) O.Schwarz (1944), not validly publ.; Cedrus libanotica Link (1831), nom. superfl.; Cedrus libanotica subsp. libani (A.Rich.) Holmboe (1914); Cedrus patula K.Koch (1873), nom. superfl.; Larix cedrus (L.) Mill. (1768); Larix patula Salisb. (1807), nom. superfl.; Peuce cedrus (L.) Rich. (1810), not validly publ.; Picea cedrus (L.) Peterm. (1838-1845); Pinus cedrus L. (1753); Pinus cedrus var. effusa Voss (1913), not validly publ.; Pinus effusa Salisb. (1796), nom. superfl. Synonyms of C. libani var. libani: Cedrus elegans Knight (1850); Cedrus libanensis Juss. ex Mirb. (1825); Cedrus libani var. argentea Antoine & Kotschy (1855); Cedrus libani f. nana (Loudon) Beissn. (1887); Cedrus libani var. nana Loudon (1838); Cedrus libani f. pendula (Carrière) Beissn. (1887); Cedrus libani pendula Knight & Perry (1850), nom. nud.; Cedrus libani var. pendula Carrière (1855); Cedrus libani var. pendula-sargentii Hornibr. (1923); Cedrus libani var. stenocoma (O.Schwarz) Frankis (2000 publ. 2001); Cedrus libani subsp. stenocoma (O.Schwarz) Greuter & Burdet (1981); Cedrus libanitica var. pendula (Carrière) L.H.Bailey (1933); Cedrus libanitica var. sargentii Hornibr. (1939), nom. superfl.; Cedrus libanitica subsp. stenocoma O.Schwarz (1944); Cedrus libanotica f. pendula (Carrière) Rehder (1925); Cedrus libanotica var. pendula (Carrière) Rehder (1927)

= Cedrus libani =

Lebanon cedar

Species of cedar tree from the Eastern Mediterranean

Cedrus libani, commonly known as cedar of Lebanon, Lebanon cedar, or Lebanese cedar (Arabic: أرز لبناني, romanized: ʾarz lubnāniyy), is a species of large conifer in the pine family, Pinaceae, and is native to the mountains of the Eastern Mediterranean basin. Known for its longevity, height, and durable wood, it has held profound significance for millennia. The tree features in ancient Mesopotamian literature. It is the national emblem of Lebanon and is widely used as an ornamental tree in parks and gardens. Historically, the ancient Phoenicians used Cedar wood for shipbuilding and traded Cedar trees with Ancient Egypt, Ancient Greece, Anatolians, Iberians, Punics, Sicilians, Romans and Ancient Iraq.

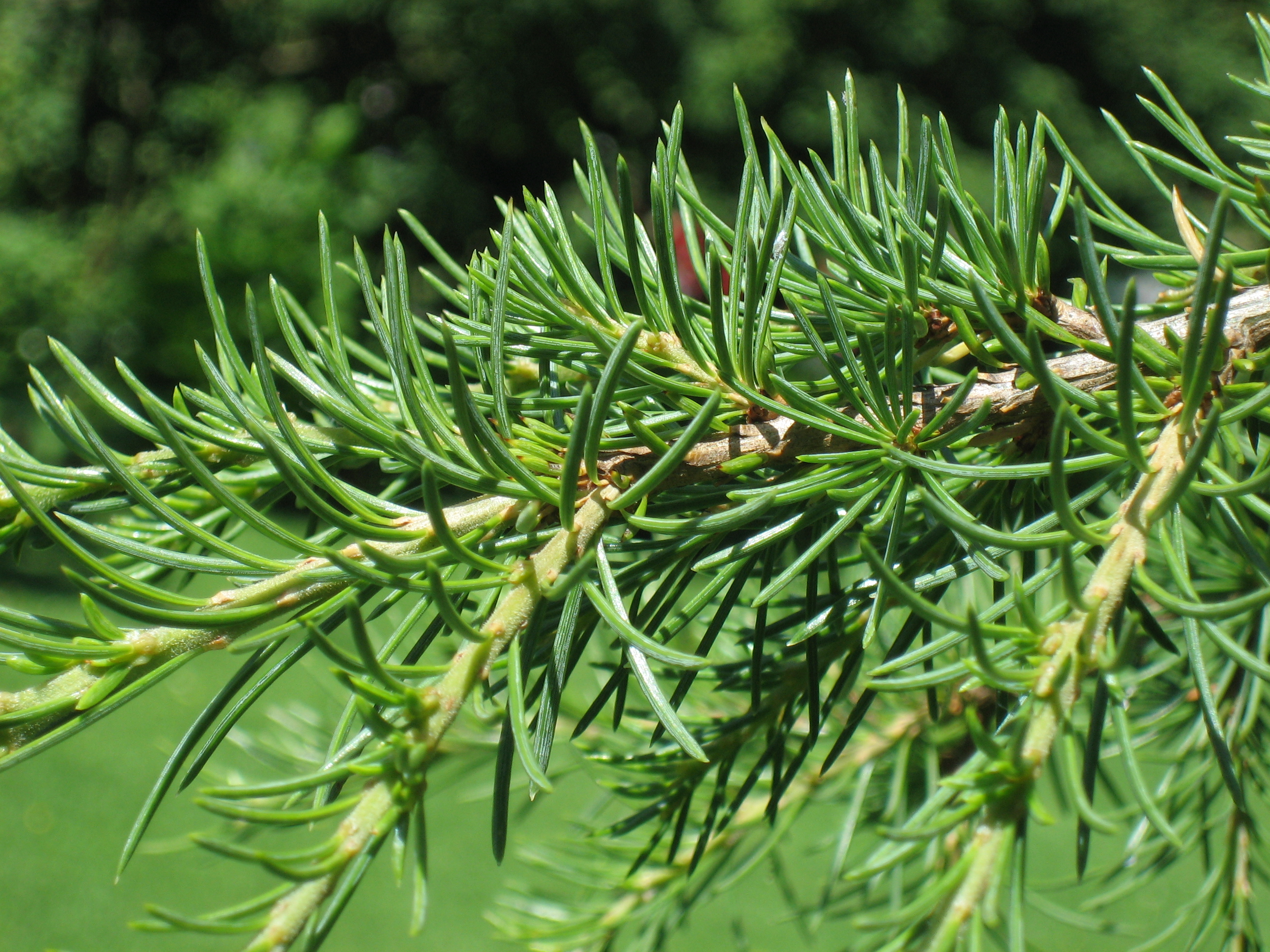
Foliage

Cedrus libani can reach 40 m (130 ft) in height, with a massive monopodial columnar trunk up to 2.5 m (8 ft 2 in) in diameter. The trunks of old, open-grown trees often fork into several large, erect branches. The rough and scaly bark is dark grey to blackish brown, and is run through by deep, horizontal fissures that peel in small chips. The first-order branches are ascending in young trees; they grow to a massive size and take on a horizontal, wide-spreading disposition. Second-order branches are dense and grow in a horizontal plane. The crown is conical when young, becoming broadly tabular with age with fairly level branches; trees growing in dense forests maintain more conical shape.

== Shoots and leaves ==
The shoots are dimorphic, with both long and short shoots. New shoots are pale brown, older shoots turn grey, grooved and scaly. C. libani has slightly resinous ovoid vegetative buds measuring 2 to 3 mm (0.079 to 0.118 in) long and 1.5 to 2 mm (0.059 to 0.079 in) wide enclosed by pale brown deciduous scales. The leaves are needle-like, arranged in spirals and concentrated at the proximal end of the long shoots, and in clusters of 15–35 on the short shoots; they are 5 to 35 mm (0.20 to 1.38 in) long and 1 to 1.5 mm (0.039 to 0.059 in) wide, rhombic in cross-section, and vary from light green to glaucous green with stomatal bands on all four sides.

== Cones ==
Cedrus libani produces cones beginning at around the age of 20–40. Its cones are borne in autumn, the male cones appear in early September and the female ones in late September. Male cones occur at the ends of the short shoots; they are solitary and erect about 4 to 5 cm (1.6 to 2.0 in) long and mature from pale green to pale yellow-brown. The female seed cones also grow at the terminal ends of short shoots. The young seed cones are resinous, sessile, and pale green; they require 12 months after pollination to mature. The mature, woody cones are 8 to 12 cm (3.1 to 4.7 in) long and 3 to 6 cm (1.2 to 2.4 in) wide; they are scaly, resinous, ovoid or barrel-shaped, and green ripening to grey-brown the autumn after pollination. Mature cones open from top to bottom, they disintegrate and lose their seed scales, releasing the seeds until only the cone rachis remains attached to the branches.

The seed scales are thin, broad, and coriaceous, measuring 3.5 to 4 cm (1.4 to 1.6 in) long and 3 to 3.5 cm (1.2 to 1.4 in) wide. The seeds are ovoid, 10 to 14 mm (0.39 to 0.55 in) long and 4 to 6 mm (0.16 to 0.24 in) wide, attached to a light brown wedge-shaped wing that is 20 to 30 mm (0.79 to 1.18 in) long and 15 to 18 mm (0.59 to 0.71 in) wide. C. libani grows rapidly until the age of 45 to 50 years; growth becomes extremely slow after the age of 70.

== Taxonomy ==
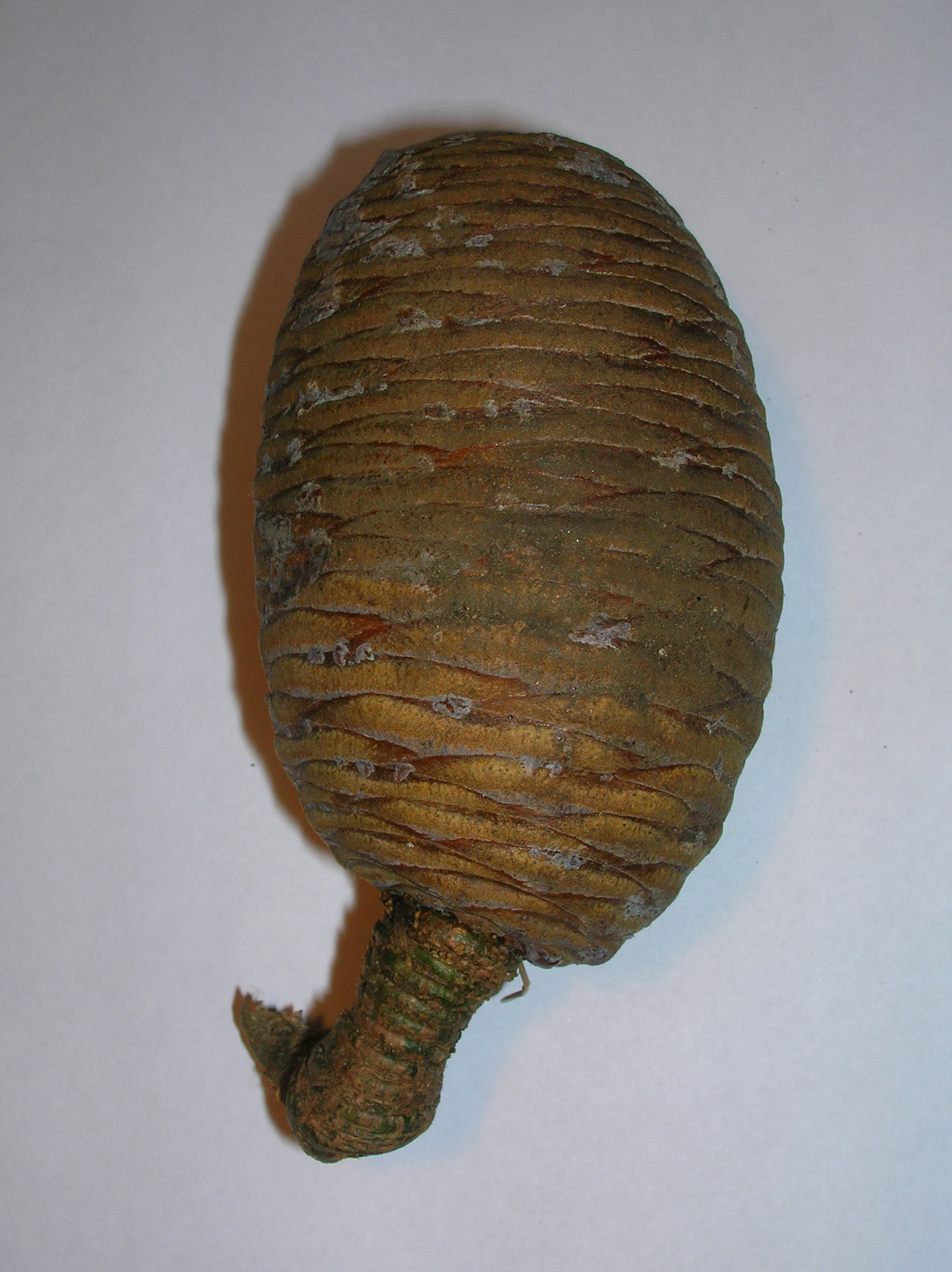
Female cone showing flecks of resin

Cedrus is the Latin name for true cedars. The specific epithet refers to the Lebanon mountain range where the species was first described by French botanist Achille Richard; the tree is commonly known as the Lebanon cedar or cedar of Lebanon. Two to three distinct types are accepted as varieties: C. libani var. libani, C. libani var. brevifolia, and C. libani var. stenocoma; the last not being considered distinct by all authorities.

C. libani var. libani: Lebanon cedar, cedar of Lebanon – grows in Lebanon, western Syria, and south-central Turkey. C. libani var. stenocoma (the Taurus cedar), considered a subspecies in earlier literature, is now considered as a variety or ecotype of C. libani var. libani. It usually has a spreading crown that does not flatten. This distinct morphology is a habit that is assumed to cope with the competitive environment, since the tree occurs in dense stands mixed with the tall-growing Abies cilicica, or in pure stands of young cedar trees. Isozyme analysis however placed var. stenocoma closer to var. brevifolia than to var. libani, even placing var. brevifolia embedded within var. stenocoma samples.

C. libani var. brevifolia: The Cyprus cedar occurs on the island's Troodos Mountains. This taxon was considered a separate species from C. libani because of morphological and ecophysiological trait differences. It is characterised by slow growth, shorter needles, and higher tolerance to drought and aphids. Genetic relationship studies, however, did not separate C. brevifolia as a separate species, the markers being indistinguishable from those of C. libani.

== Distribution and habitat ==
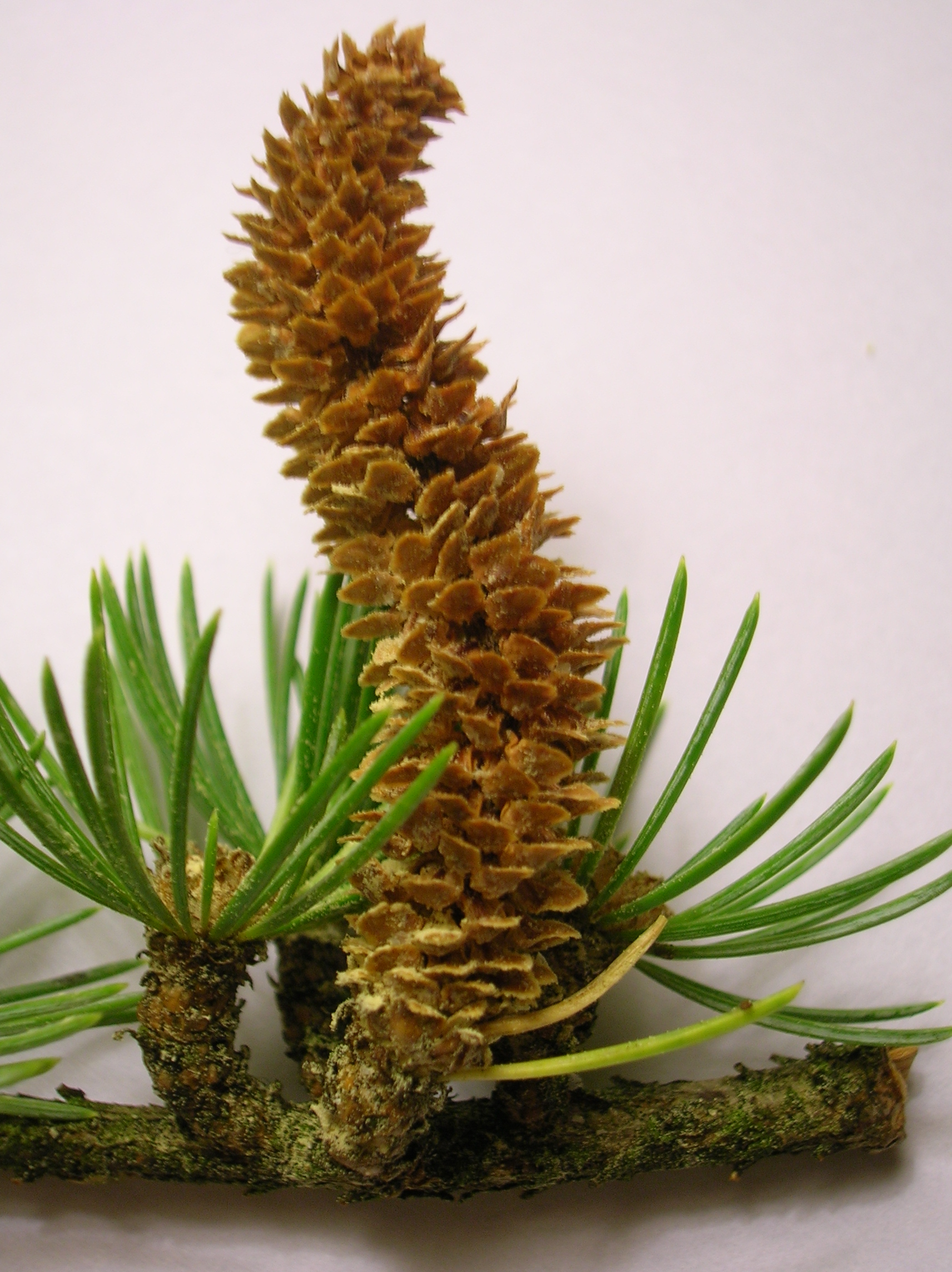
Male cone

C. libani var. libani is endemic to elevated mountains around the Eastern Mediterranean in Lebanon, Syria, and Turkey. The tree grows in well-drained calcareous lithosols on rocky, north- and west-facing slopes and ridges and thrives in rich loam or a sandy clay in full sun. Its natural habitat is characterised by warm, dry summers and cool, moist winters with an annual precipitation of 1,000 to 1,500 mm (39 to 59 in); the trees are blanketed by a heavy snow cover at the higher elevations. In Lebanon and Turkey, it occurs most abundantly at elevations of 1,300 to 3,000 m (4,300 to 9,800 ft), where it forms pure forests or mixed forests with Cilician fir (Abies cilicica), European black pine (Pinus nigra), Turkish pine (Pinus brutia), and several juniper species. In Turkey, it can occur as low as 500 m (1,600 ft).

C. libani var. brevifolia grows in similar conditions in the Troodos Mountains of Cyprus at medium to high elevations ranging from 900 to 1,525 m (2,953 to 5,003 ft).

== History and symbolism ==
In the Epic of Gilgamesh, one of the earliest great works of literature, the Sumerian hero Gilgamesh and his friend Enkidu travel to the legendary Cedar Forest to kill its guardian and cut down its trees. While early versions of the story place the forest in Iran, later Babylonian accounts of the story place the Cedar Forest in Lebanon.

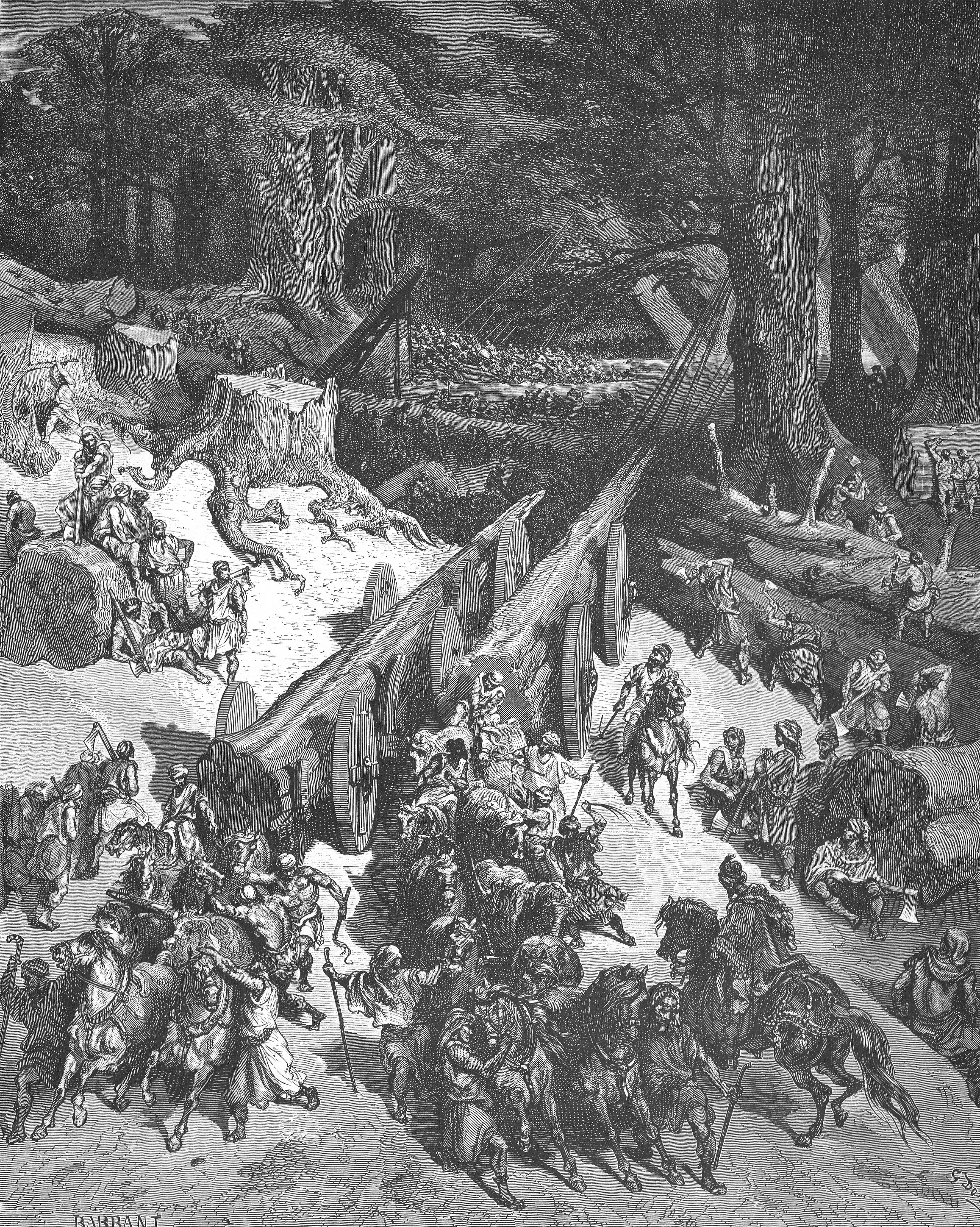
Cedars of Lebanon felled for use in the Jerusalem Temple, illustration by Gustave Doré (1866)

The Lebanon cedar is mentioned several times in the Bible. Hebrew priests were ordered by Moses to use the bark of the Lebanon cedar in the treatment of leprosy. Solomon also procured cedar timber to build the Temple in Jerusalem. The Hebrew prophet Isaiah used the Lebanon cedar (together with "oaks of Bashan", "all the high mountains" and "every high tower") as examples of loftiness as a metaphor for the pride of the world and in Psalm 92:12 it says "The righteous shall flourish like the palm tree: he shall grow like a cedar in Lebanon".

According to a rabbinic legend found in the Talmud, the cedar of Lebanon appears symbolically in Yohanan ben Zakkai's meeting with the Roman general Vespasian during the First Jewish–Roman War. As the story goes, when ben Zakkai secretly fled the besieged Jerusalem to negotiate with Vespasian, he prophesied the general's rise to the imperial throne by citing a prophecy from the Book of Isaiah: "And the Lebanon shall fall by a mighty one" (Isaiah 10:34). In this interpretation, "Lebanon" is understood to represent the Temple in Jerusalem, which was built using cedars from Lebanon, and the "mighty one" is Vespasian, implying that his destruction of the Temple would signal his ascent as emperor.

=== National and regional significance ===
The Flag of Lebanon

The Lebanon cedar is the national emblem of Lebanon, and is displayed on the flag of Lebanon and coat of arms of Lebanon. It is also the logo of Middle East Airlines, which is Lebanon's national carrier. Beyond that, it is also the main symbol of Lebanon's "Cedar Revolution" of 2005, the 17 October Revolution, also known as the Thawra ("Revolution"). Lebanon is sometimes metonymically referred to as the Land of the Cedars.

== Cultivation ==
Cultivation of Lebanon cedar dates back at least 3,200 years, when the Hittite Empire established two populations of the species in northern Turkey where it did not occur naturally.

The Lebanon cedar is now widely planted as an ornamental tree in parks and gardens.

=== Britain and Ireland ===
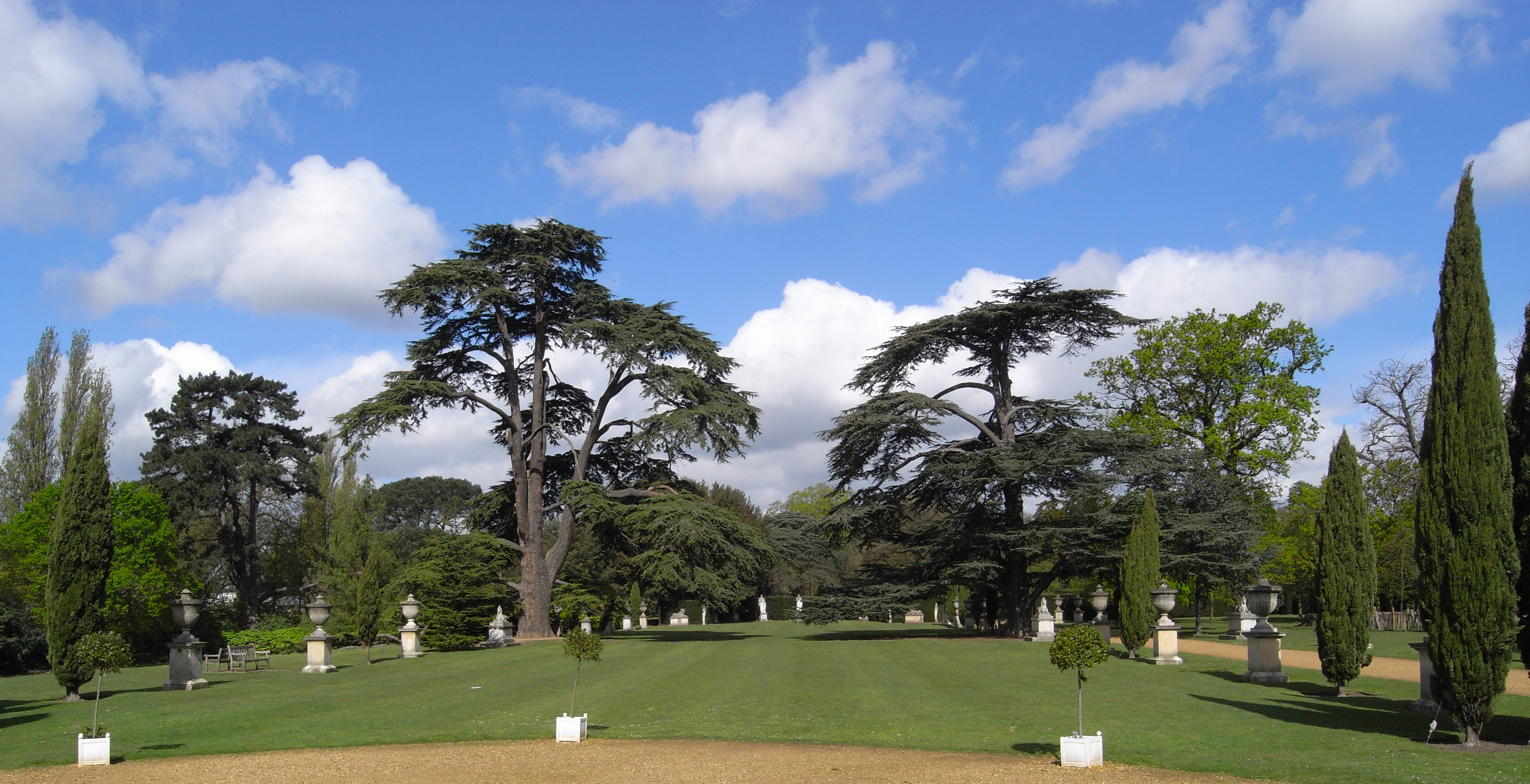
The cedars at Chiswick House

The first Lebanon cedars in Britain were introduced by Edward Pococke, who collected seed in 1638–39 while based in Syria as chaplain to the Turkey Company; on his return to Britain, he was given the living of Childrey; a tree he planted at the Rectory there in 1646 is the oldest surviving specimen in Britain. Most other very early-planted trees in Britain were killed in an unusually severe winter in 1739–1740, but one planted at Peper Harow in Surrey in 1735 also survives. In Ireland, one at Adare Manor in County Limerick, thought to have been planted in 1645, may also be from Pococke's original import, but this is not verified. The species is mentioned in Sylva, or A Discourse of Forest-Trees and the Propagation of Timber by John Evelyn. In Britain, cedars of Lebanon are known for their use in London's Highgate Cemetery and Blenheim Palace.

Two of the oldest cedars in Britain survive on the lawn in front of Chiswick House which was laid out by the Richard Boyle, 3rd Earl of Burlington and William Kent in the 1720s. At Bowood House the arboretum contains cedars, one of which in 2016 was measured at more than 126 feet (38 m) making it one of the tallest in Europe. In the 1760s, Charles Lennox, 3rd Duke of Richmond planted some 2,000 trees at Goodwood House. Those that survive are among the finest examples that may be seen anywhere in the United Kingdom.

C. libani has gained the Royal Horticultural Society's Award of Garden Merit (confirmed 2017).

=== France ===
One of the oldest cedars in France was planted in the Jardin des Plantes in Paris in 1734 by Bernard de Jussieu. Another was planted in 1756 by Dom Robbe, the founder of the Jardin des Plantes d’Amiens in the Hôtel de préfecture de la Somme, Amiens.

=== North America ===
Cedrus libani on the western edge of the Quad, University of Washington, Seattle.

The first cedars arrived in North America when Peter Colinson sent seed to John Bartram in Pennsylvanio in 1746. George Washington was buried in 1799 beneath a Cedar of Lebanon at Mount Vernon.

Arkansas, among other US states, has a Champion Tree program that records exceptional tree specimens. A Lebanon cedar listed by the state is located inside Hot Springs National Park and is estimated to be over 100 years old.

Cedrus libani is considered hardy to USDA Zone 7 (-12.2 to -17.7 °C).

=== Propagation ===
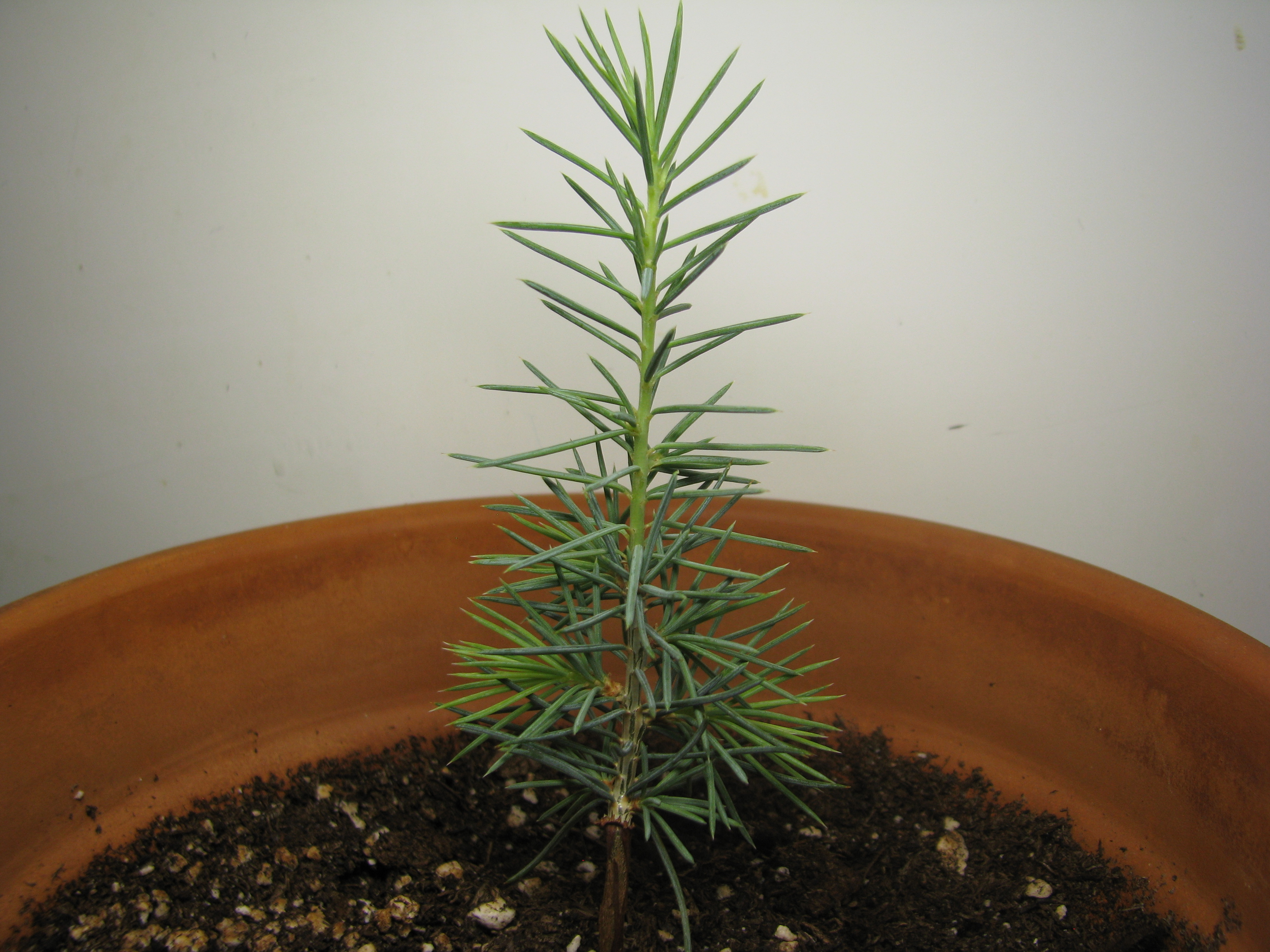
An eight-month-old seedling

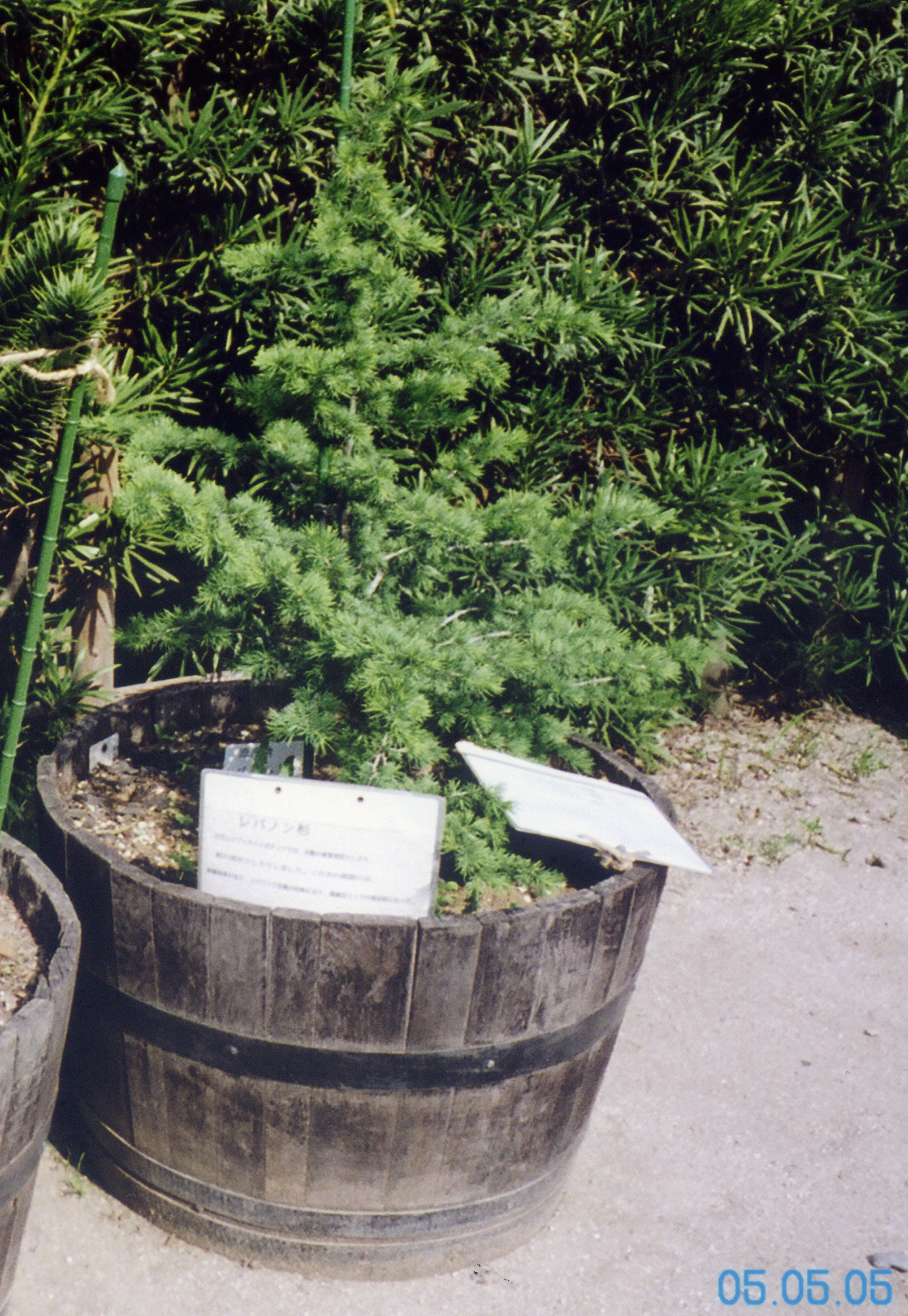
Small Cedrus libani in Shimizu Park, Noda, Chiba, Japan

In order to germinate Cedrus libani seeds, potting soil is preferred, since it is less likely to contain fungal species which may kill the seedling in its early stages. Before sowing it is important to soak the seed at room temperature for a period of 24 hours followed by cold stratification (~3–5 °C) for two to four weeks. Once the seeds have been sown, it is recommended that they be kept at room temperature (~20 °C) and in the vicinity of sunlight. The soil should be kept slightly damp with low frequency watering. Over-watering may cause damping off which will quickly kill the seedlings. Initial growth will be around 3–5 cm the first year and will accelerate subsequent years.

== Uses ==
Cedar wood is prized for its fine grain, attractive yellow colour, and fragrance. It is exceptionally durable and immune to insect ravages. Wood from C. libani has a density of 560 kg/m^{3}; it is used for furniture, construction, and handicrafts. In Turkey, shelterwood cutting and clearcutting techniques are used to harvest timber and promote uniform forest regeneration. Cedar resin (cedria) and cedar essential oil (cedrum) are prized extracts from the timber and cones of the cedar tree.

== Ecology and conservation ==
Over the centuries, extensive deforestation has occurred, with only small remnants of the original forests surviving. Deforestation has been particularly severe in Lebanon and on Cyprus; on Cyprus, only small trees up to 25 m (82 ft) tall survive, though Pliny the Elder recorded cedars 40 m (130 ft) tall there. Attempts have been made at various times throughout history to conserve the Lebanon cedars. The first was made by the Roman emperor Hadrian; he created an imperial forest and ordered it marked by inscribing boundary stones, two of which are in the museum of the American University of Beirut.

Extensive reforestation of cedar is carried out in the Mediterranean region. In Turkey, over 50 million young cedars are planted annually, covering an area around 300 square kilometres (74,000 acres). Lebanese cedar populations are also expanding through an active program combining replanting and protection of natural regeneration from browsing goats, hunting, forest fires, and woodworms. The Lebanese approach emphasizes natural regeneration by creating proper growing conditions. The Lebanese state has created several reserves, including the Chouf Cedar Reserve, the Jaj Cedar Reserve, the Tannourine Reserve, the Ammouaa and Karm Shbat Reserves in the Akkar district, and the Cedars of God forest near Bsharri.

Because during the seedling stage, differentiating C. libani from C. atlantica or C. deodara is difficult, the American University of Beirut has developed a DNA-based method of identification to ensure that reforestation efforts in Lebanon are of the cedars of Lebanon and not other types.

== Diseases and pests ==
C. libani is susceptible to a number of soil-borne, foliar, and stem pathogens. The seedlings are prone to fungal attacks. Botrytis cinerea, a necrotrophic fungus known to cause considerable damage to food crops, attacks the cedar needles, causing them to turn yellow and drop. Armillaria mellea (commonly known as honey fungus) is a basidiomycete that fruits in dense clusters at the base of trunks or stumps and attacks the roots of cedars growing in wet soils. The Lebanese cedar shoot moth (Parasyndemis cedricola) is a species of moth of the family Tortricidae found in the forests of Lebanon and Turkey; its larvae feed on young cedar leaves and buds.

== In art and literature ==
An engraving of a painting by William Henry Bartlett, Beirout and Mount Lebanon was published in Fisher's Drawing Room Scrap Book, 1838 with a poetical illustration by Letitia Elizabeth Landon, entitled The Cedars of Lebanon.

== Gallery ==
Cedar views in Lebanon

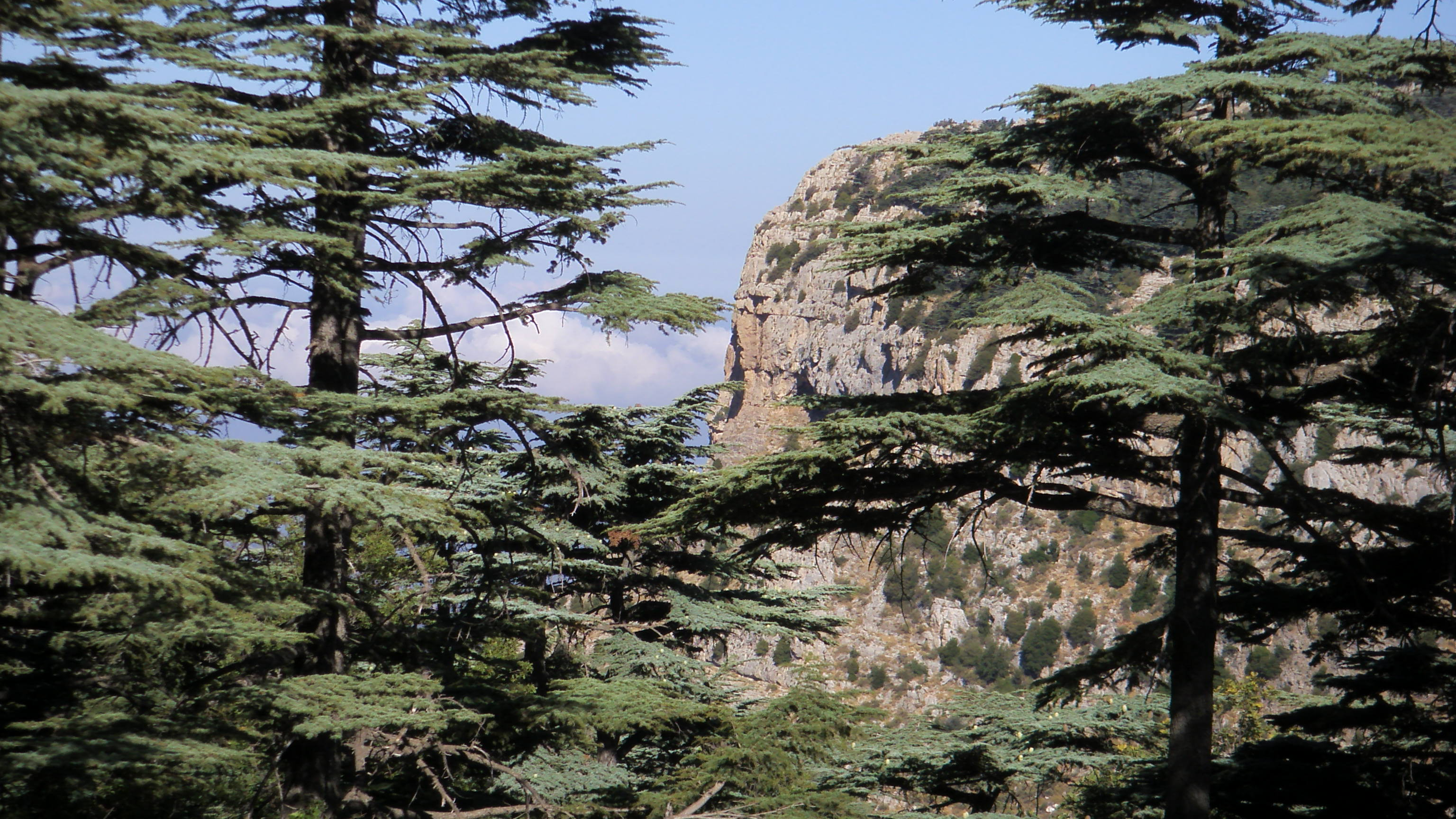
Tannourine

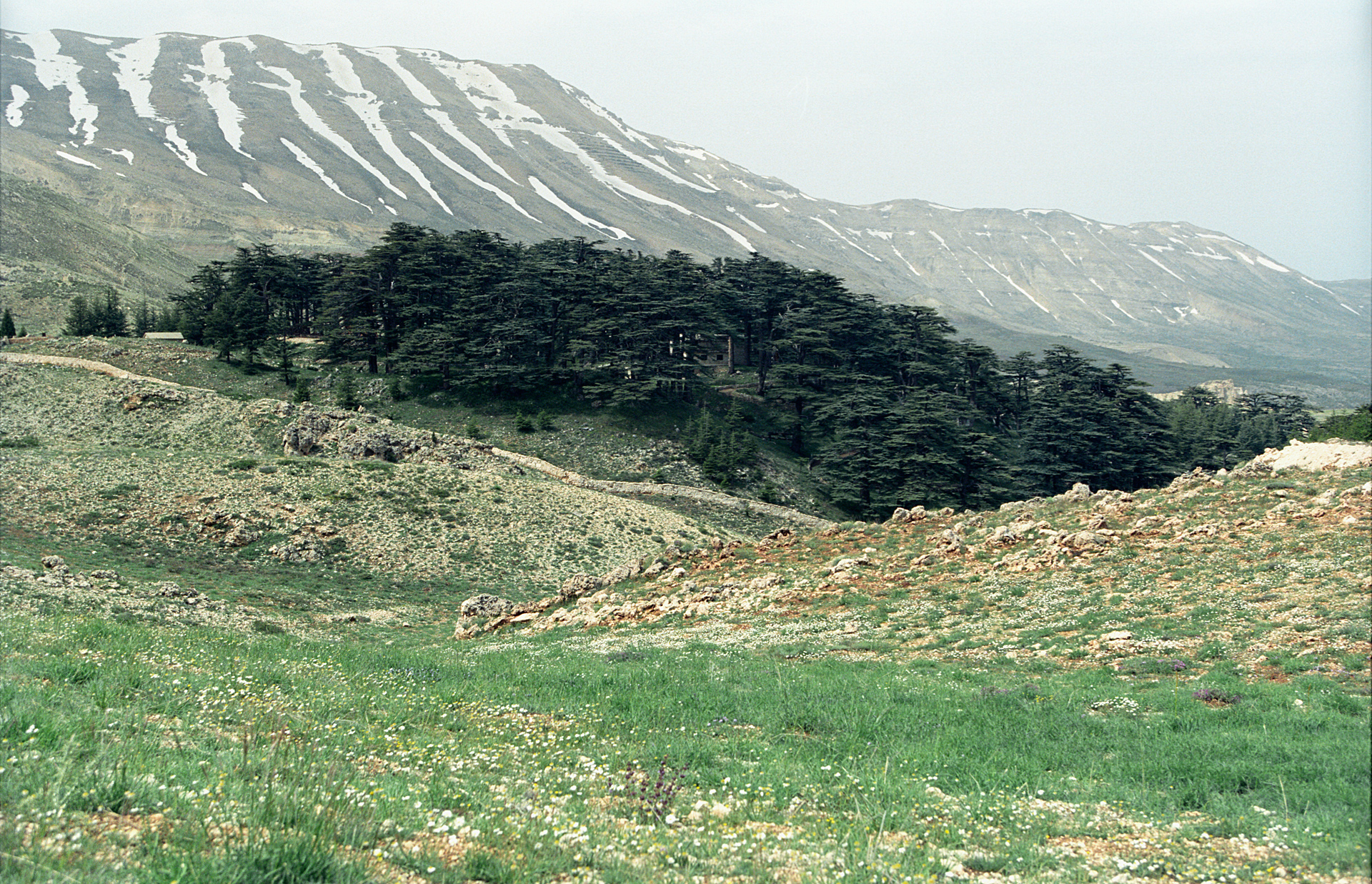
"Cedars of God" grove, Bsharri

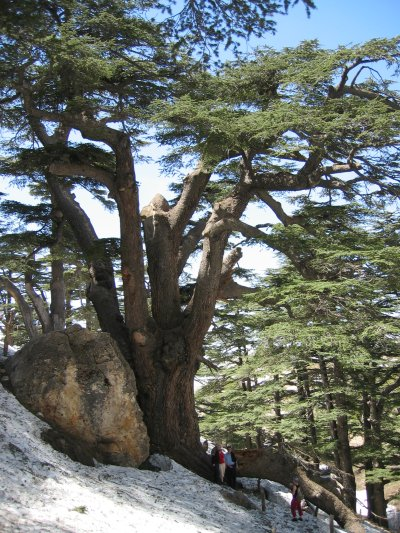
"Cedars of God", Bsharri

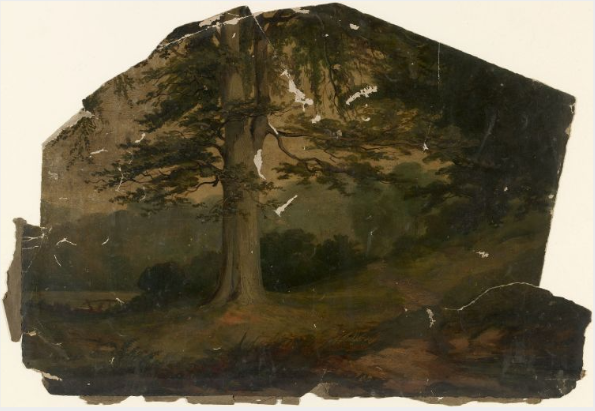
19th century painting

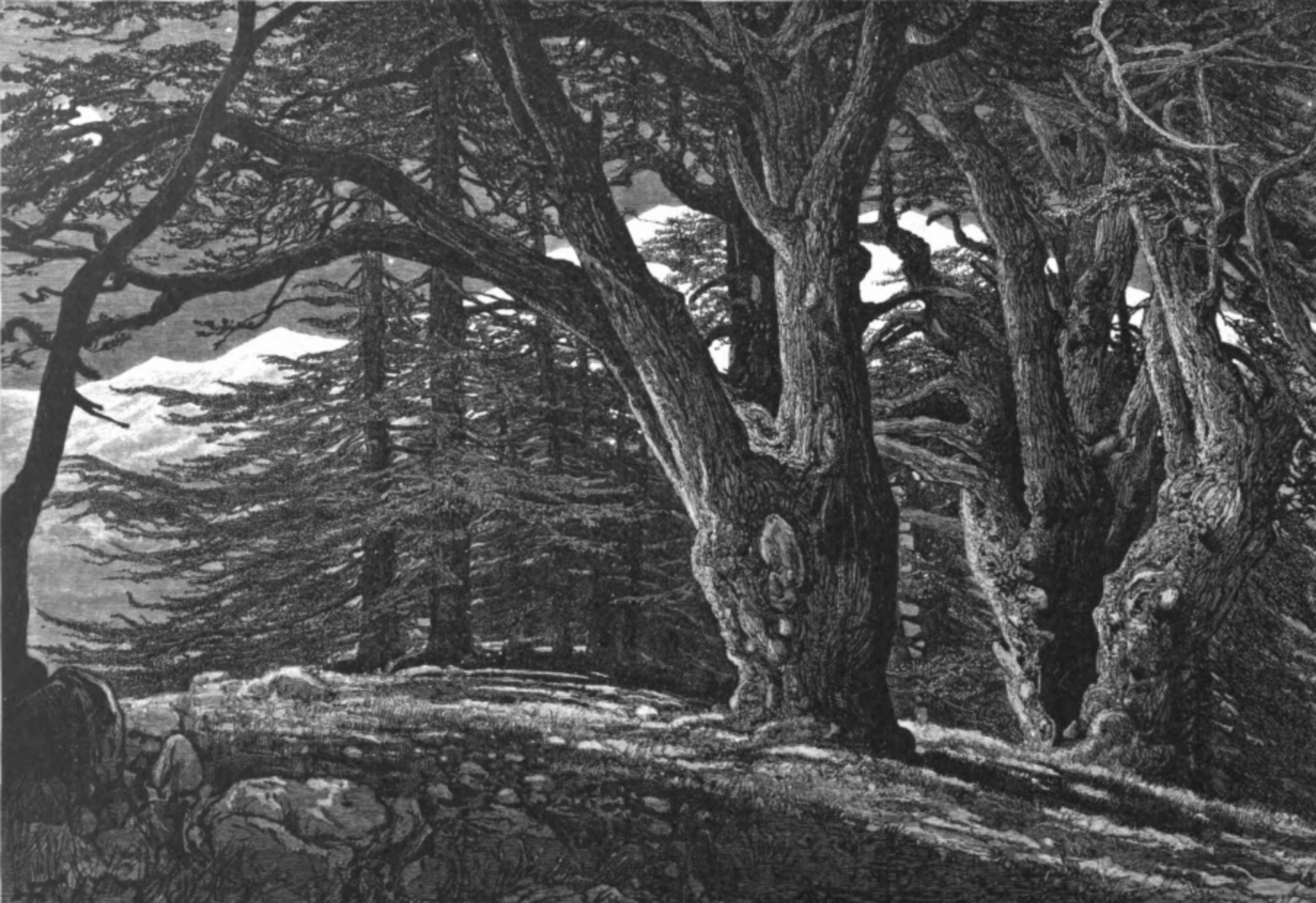
1881 engraving

== See also ==
- Cedar Forest – Lebanon cedar forest that was home to the gods in Ancient Mesopotamian religion
- Cedars of God – an old-growth C. libani forest and World Heritage Site
- List of plants known as cedar

== Bibliography ==
- CABI (1 January 2013). Praciak, Andrew (ed.). The CABI Encyclopedia of Forest Trees. Centre for Agriculture and Bioscience International. ISBN 978-1-78064-236-9.
- Coxe, John Redman (1 January 1808). The Philadelphia Medical Dictionary: Containing a Concise Explanation of All the Terms Used in Medicine, Surgery, Pharmacy, Botany, Natural History, Chymistry, and Materia Medica. Thomas Dobson; Thomas and George Palmer, printers.
- Cromer, Gerald (1 January 2004). A War of Words: Political Violence and Public Debate in Israel. Frank Cass. ISBN 978-0-7146-5631-1.
- Dagher-Kharrat, Magida Bou; Mariette, Stéphanie; Lefèvre, François; Fady, Bruno; March, Ghislaine Grenier-de; Plomion, Christophe; Savouré, Arnould (21 November 2006). "Geographical diversity and genetic relationships among Cedrus species estimated by AFLP". Tree Genetics & Genomes. 3 (3): 275–285. doi:10.1007/s11295-006-0065-x. ISSN 1614-2942. S2CID 25475555.
- Debazac, E. F. (1 January 1964). Manuel des conifères (in French). École nationale des eaux et forêts.
- Eckenwalder, James E. (14 November 2009). Conifers of the World: The Complete Reference. Timber Press. ISBN 978-0-88192-974-4.
- Erman, Adolf (1 January 1927). The Literature of the Ancient Egyptians: Poems, Narratives, and Manuals of Instruction, from the Third and Second Millennia B. C. Methuen & Company, Limited.
- Fabre, JP; Bariteau, M; Chalon, A; Thevenet, J (2001). "Possibilités de multiplication de pucerons Cedrobium laportei Remaudiére (Homoptera, Lachnidae) sur différentes provenances du genre Cedrus et sur deux hybrides d'espéces, perspectives d'utilisation en France". International Meeting on Sylviculture of Cork Oak (Quercus Suber L.) and Atlas Cedar (Cedrus Atlantica Manetti).
- Fady, B.; Lefèvre, F.; Reynaud, M.; Vendramin, G. G.; Bou Dagher-Kharrat, M.; Anzidei, M.; Pastorelli, R.; Savouré, A.; Bariteau, M. (1 October 2003). "Gene flow among different taxonomic units: evidence from nuclear and cytoplasmic markers in Cedrus plantation forests". Theoretical and Applied Genetics. 107 (6): 1132–1138. doi:10.1007/s00122-003-1323-z. ISSN 0040-5752. PMID 14523524. S2CID 11703268.
- Farjon, Aljos (27 April 2010). A Handbook of the World's Conifers (2 Vols.). BRILL. ISBN 978-90-04-17718-5.
- Greuter, W.; Burdet, H.M.; Long, G., eds. (1984). "A critical inventory of vascular plants of the circum-mediterranean countries". ww2.bgbm.org. Botanic Garden and Botanical Museum, Berlin.
- Güner, Adil, ed. (9 April 2001). Flora of Turkey and the East Aegean Islands: Flora of Turkey, Volume 11 (1 ed.). Edinburgh University Press. ISBN 978-0-7486-1409-7.
- Hemery, Gabriel; Simblet, Sarah (21 October 2014). The New Sylva: A Discourse of Forest and Orchard Trees for the Twenty-First Century. A&C Black. ISBN 978-1-4088-3544-9.
- Howard, Frances (1 January 1955). Ornamental Trees: An Illustrated Guide to Their Selection and Care. University of California Press. ISBN 978-0-520-00795-6.
- Mehdi, Ladjal (1 January 2001). Variabilité de l'adaptation à la sécheresse des cèdres méditerranéens (Cedrus atlantica, C. Brevifolia et C. Libani): aspects écophysiologiques. Doctorate Thesis, Université Henri Poincaré Nancy 1. Faculté des Sciences et Techniques (These de doctorat) – via www.theses.fr.
- Masri, Rania (1995), "The Cedars of Lebanon: significance, awareness and management of the Cedrus libani in Lebanon", Cedars awareness and salvation effort lecture, Massachusetts Institute of Technology seminar on the environment in Lebanon, Massachusetts Institute of Technology
- Shackley, Myra (1 October 2004). "Managing the Cedars of Lebanon: Botanical Gardens or Living Forests?". Current Issues in Tourism. 7 (4–5): 417–425. doi:10.1080/13683500408667995. ISSN 1368-3500. S2CID 153516841.
- Saint-Vincent, Bory de (1 January 1823). Dictionnaire classique d'histoire naturelle (in French). Vol. 3. Paris: Rey et Gravier. p. 299.
- Talhouk, Salma; Zurayk, Rami (2003). "Conifer conservation in Lebanon". Acta Horticulturae. 615 (615): 411–414. doi:10.17660/ActaHortic.2003.615.46. Archived from the original on 25 February 2021.
