= List of Pabstiella species =

The following is a list of Pabstiella species accepted by the Plants of the World Online as of August 2023.

- Pabstiella acrogenia Luer & Toscano
- Pabstiella alligatorifera (Rchb.f.) Luer
- Pabstiella analoga Luer & Toscano
- Pabstiella aperta (Kraenzl.) Pupulin
- Pabstiella arcuata (Lindl.) Luer
- Pabstiella armeniaca (Barb.Rodr.) L.Kollmann
- Pabstiella aryter (Luer) F.Barros
- Pabstiella atrata (Chiron & Xim.Bols.) Karremans
- Pabstiella aurantiaca (Barb.Rodr.) Chiron
- Pabstiella aveniformis (Hoehne) Luer
- Pabstiella bacillaris (Pabst) Luer
- Pabstiella biriricensis Chiron & Xim.Bols.
- Pabstiella bofiae Chiron & Tesch
- Pabstiella brachystele Chiron & N.Sanson
- Pabstiella bradei (Schltr.) Luer
- Pabstiella brasilica Luer & Toscano (Synonym of Madisonia brasilica)
- Pabstiella calcarata (Cogn.) Luer
- Pabstiella calimanii Toscano & Luer
- Pabstiella campestris (Barb.Rodr.) Luer
- Pabstiella capijumensis Luer & Toscano
- Pabstiella caraguatatubensis M.R.Miranda, F.J.de Jesus & Chiron
- Pabstiella carinifera (Barb.Rodr.) Luer
- Pabstiella carrisii (Brade) Luer (Synonym of Madisonia carrisii)
- Pabstiella castellensis (Brade) Luer
- Pabstiella catafestae Chiron & Xim.Bols.
- Pabstiella colorata (Pabst) Luer & Toscano
- Pabstiella conceicionensis Chiron & N.Sanson
- Pabstiella conspersa (Hoehne) Luer
- Pabstiella cordilabia (Pabst) Luer
- Pabstiella crassicaulis (Barb.Rodr.) Luer
- Pabstiella curti-bradei (Pabst) Luer
- Pabstiella dasilvae Chiron & Xim.Bols.
- Pabstiella decurva Luer & Toscano
- Pabstiella deltoglossa (Cogn.) Toscano & Luer
- Pabstiella determannii (Luer) F.Barros
- Pabstiella discors Luer & Toscano
- Pabstiella dracula (Seehawer) Luer & Toscano
- Pabstiella elegans J.Ponert, M.Portilla & Karremans
- Pabstiella elegantula (Cogn.) Luer
- Pabstiella ephemera (Lindl.) Luer
- Pabstiella eunapolitana C.R.M.Silva & S.L.X.Tobias
- Pabstiella fasciata (Seehawer) Luer
- Pabstiella fluminensis (Pabst) Luer
- Pabstiella fragae (L.Kollmann & A.P.Fontana) L.Kollmann
- Pabstiella freyi Luer & Toscano
- Pabstiella fusca (Lindl.) Chiron & Xim.Bols.
- Pabstiella garayi (Pabst) Luer
- Pabstiella ghillanyi (Pabst) Luer
- Pabstiella glandulipetala (Luer & R.Vásquez) Karremans
- Pabstiella gossameri Luer & Toscano
- Pabstiella gracilicaulis (Seehawer) Luer
- Pabstiella granulosa (Barb.Rodr.) Chiron & Xim.Bols.
- Pabstiella henrique-aragonii (Pabst) Chiron & Xim.Bols.
- Pabstiella hileiaensis N.Gut., E.C.Smidt & Toscano
- Pabstiella ibiunensis C.R.M.Silva & Campacci
- Pabstiella ignota (Luer) Karremans
- Pabstiella imbeana (Brade) F.Barros & C.F.Hall
- Pabstiella integripetala (E.M.Pessoa & F.Barros) Karremans
- Pabstiella intraptila Chiron & Xim.Bols.
- Pabstiella isabelae Chiron & Xim.Bols.
- Pabstiella itaguacuensis F.J.de Jesus & Campacci
- Pabstiella juquitibensis Campacci & S.L.X.Tobias
- Pabstiella lacerticeps Luer & Toscano
- Pabstiella laxiflora (Porsch) Chiron
- Pabstiella leucopyramis (Rchb.f.) Luer
- Pabstiella lineolata (Barb.Rodr.) Luer
- Pabstiella lingua (Lindl.) Luer
- Pabstiella lobiglossa Chiron & N.Sanson
- Pabstiella lueriana Fraga & L.Kollmann
- Pabstiella marinsiensis Campacci & C.R.M.Silva
- Pabstiella matinhensis (Hoehne) Luer
- Pabstiella melior Luer & Toscano
- Pabstiella menegattii Chiron & Tesch
- Pabstiella miniatolineolata (Hoehne) Luer
- Pabstiella mirabilis (Schltr.) Brieger & Senghas
- Pabstiella miragliae (Leite) Luer
- Pabstiella muricatifolia Fraga & L.Kollmann
- Pabstiella naimekei Chiron & Xim.Bols.
- Pabstiella novabelenensis Campacci
- Pabstiella nymphalis Luer & Toscano
- Pabstiella osculator Luer & Toscano
- Pabstiella pandurifera (Lindl.) F.Barros & C.F.Hall
- Pabstiella pantherina (Seehawer) Luer & Toscano
- Pabstiella parvifolia (Lindl.) Luer
- Pabstiella pellifeloidis (Barb.Rodr.) Luer
- Pabstiella piraquarensis (Hoehne) Luer
- Pabstiella pleurothalloides (Cogn.) Luer
- Pabstiella pomerana Chiron & Xim.Bols.
- Pabstiella pristeoglossa (Rchb.f. & Warm.) Luer
- Pabstiella pseudotrifida L.Kollmann & D.R.Couto
- Pabstiella punctatifolia (Barb.Rodr.) Chiron
- Pabstiella purpurea (Seehawer) Luer & Toscano
- Pabstiella quadridentata (Barb.Rodr.) Luer
- Pabstiella quasi Luer & Toscano
- Pabstiella ramphastorhyncha (Barb.Rodr.) L.Kollmann
- Pabstiella recurviloba Toscano & Luer
- Pabstiella rhombilabia Chiron & N.Sanson
- Pabstiella ribeironensis Chiron & Xim.Bols.
- Pabstiella robertoi (Luer & Toscano) Luer
- Pabstiella rubrolineata (Hoehne) Luer
- Pabstiella rupicola L.Kollmann
- Pabstiella ruschii (Hoehne) Luer
- Pabstiella sansonii Luer & Toscano
- Pabstiella sarcopetala (Barb.Rodr.) Luer
- Pabstiella savioi Luer & Toscano
- Pabstiella seriata (Lindl.) Luer & Toscano
- Pabstiella setibensis Chiron & Xim.Bols.
- Pabstiella silvanae Chiron & Xim.Bols.
- Pabstiella sordida (Kraenzl.) Luer
- Pabstiella sousae C.R.M.Silva & Campacci
- Pabstiella sparsiflora (Schltr.) Luer
- Pabstiella spathuliglossa (Hoehne) Luer
- Pabstiella stictophylla (Schltr.) J.O.Caetano & L.R.S.Guim.
- Pabstiella syringodes (Luer) F.Barros
- Pabstiella tabacina (Barb.Rodr.) Luer
- Pabstiella tenera (Barb.Rodr.) Luer
- Pabstiella teschiana Chiron & Xim.Bols.
- Pabstiella transparens (Schltr.) Luer
- Pabstiella tricolor (Barb.Rodr.) Luer
- Pabstiella trifida (Lindl.) Luer
- Pabstiella trimeropetala (Pabst) Luer
- Pabstiella tripterantha (Rchb.f.) F.Barros
- Pabstiella truncatilabia Chiron & Tesch
- Pabstiella truncicola (Rchb.f.) Luer
- Pabstiella uniflora (Lindl.) Luer
- Pabstiella varellae Toscano, Luer & Jacques Klein
- Pabstiella vellozoana (Schltr.) Luer
- Pabstiella verboonenii (Luer & Toscano) Luer
- Pabstiella versicolor (Porsch) Luer
- Pabstiella villosisepala L.Kollmann & Fraga
- Pabstiella viridula (Barb.Rodr.) Luer & Toscano
- Pabstiella wacketii (Handro & Pabst) Luer
- Pabstiella wanderbildtiana (Pabst) F.Barros & C.F.Hall
- Pabstiella wawraeana (Barb.Rodr.) Chiron & Xim.Bols.
- Pabstiella yauaperyensis (Barb.Rodr.) F.Barros
