= P. armeniaca =

P. armeniaca may refer to:

- Phlomis armeniaca, a herbaceous plant species found in Turkey
- Pireneitega armeniaca, a spider species in the genus Pireneitega
- Pleurothallis armeniaca, an orchid species in the genus Pleurothallis
- Prunus armeniaca, the apricot tree, a plant species

== See also ==
- Armeniaca (disambiguation)
