= Phlomis grandiflora =

Scientific classification
- Kingdom: Plantae
- Clade: Tracheophytes
- Clade: Angiosperms
- Clade: Eudicots
- Clade: Asterids
- Order: Lamiales
- Family: Lamiaceae
- Genus: Phlomis
- Species: P. grandiflora

Binomial name
- Phlomis grandiflora H.S.Thomps.

Synonyms
- Phlomis fimbrilligera Hub.-Mor.; Phlomis grandiflora var. fimbrilligera (Hub.-Mor.) Hub.-Mor.

Species of flowering plant

Phlomis grandiflora, called Jerusalem sage along with a number of other species, is a flowering plant in the family Lamiaceae, native to the eastern Aegean Islands and Turkey. Its cultivar 'Lloyd's Silver' has gained the Royal Horticultural Society's Award of Garden Merit as an ornamental.
