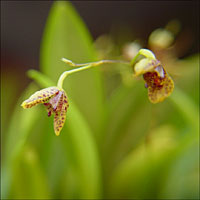

Scientific classification
- Kingdom: Plantae
- Clade: Tracheophytes
- Clade: Angiosperms
- Clade: Monocots
- Order: Asparagales
- Family: Orchidaceae
- Subfamily: Epidendroideae
- Genus: Pabstiella
- Species: P. fusca

Binomial name
- Pabstiella fusca (Lindl.) Chiron & Xim. Bols.

Synonyms
- Effusiella fusca; Effusiella hypnicola; Humboltia hypnicola; Pabstiella hypnicola; Pleurothallis fusca; Pleurothallis hypnicola; Specklinia hypnicola; Stelis hypnicola

= Pabstiella fusca =

Species of perennial herb

Pabstiella fusca is a species of perennial herb in the family Orchidaceae. The species is both epiphytic and cespitosic.

The species is native to southern parts of Brazil. It can be found in São Paulo, Rio Grande Do Sul, Santa Catarina, Cerrado, Bahia, Espirito Santo, Rio de Janeiro, Paraná, Minas Gerais, as well as the Atlantic Forest.

Pabstiella fusca lives on trees at an altitude of 1200 m located in forests with humid climates as well as trees that are deciduous.
