= Pabstiella verboonenii =

Scientific classification
- Kingdom: Plantae
- Clade: Tracheophytes
- Clade: Angiosperms
- Clade: Monocots
- Order: Asparagales
- Family: Orchidaceae
- Subfamily: Epidendroideae
- Genus: Pabstiella
- Species: P. verboonenii

Binomial name
- Pabstiella verboonenii (Luer & Toscano) Luer

Synonyms
- Pleurothallis verboonenii Luer & Toscano

Species of plant

Pabstiella verboonenii is a species of orchid plant native to Brazil.
