= Pabstiella alligatorifera =

Scientific classification
- Kingdom: Plantae
- Clade: Tracheophytes
- Clade: Angiosperms
- Clade: Monocots
- Order: Asparagales
- Family: Orchidaceae
- Subfamily: Epidendroideae
- Genus: Pabstiella
- Species: P. alligatorifera

Binomial name
- Pabstiella alligatorifera (Rchb.f.) Luer

Synonyms
- Pleurothallis alligatorifera Rchb.f.; Pleurothallis blumenavii (Barb.Rodr.) Cogn.

Species of plant

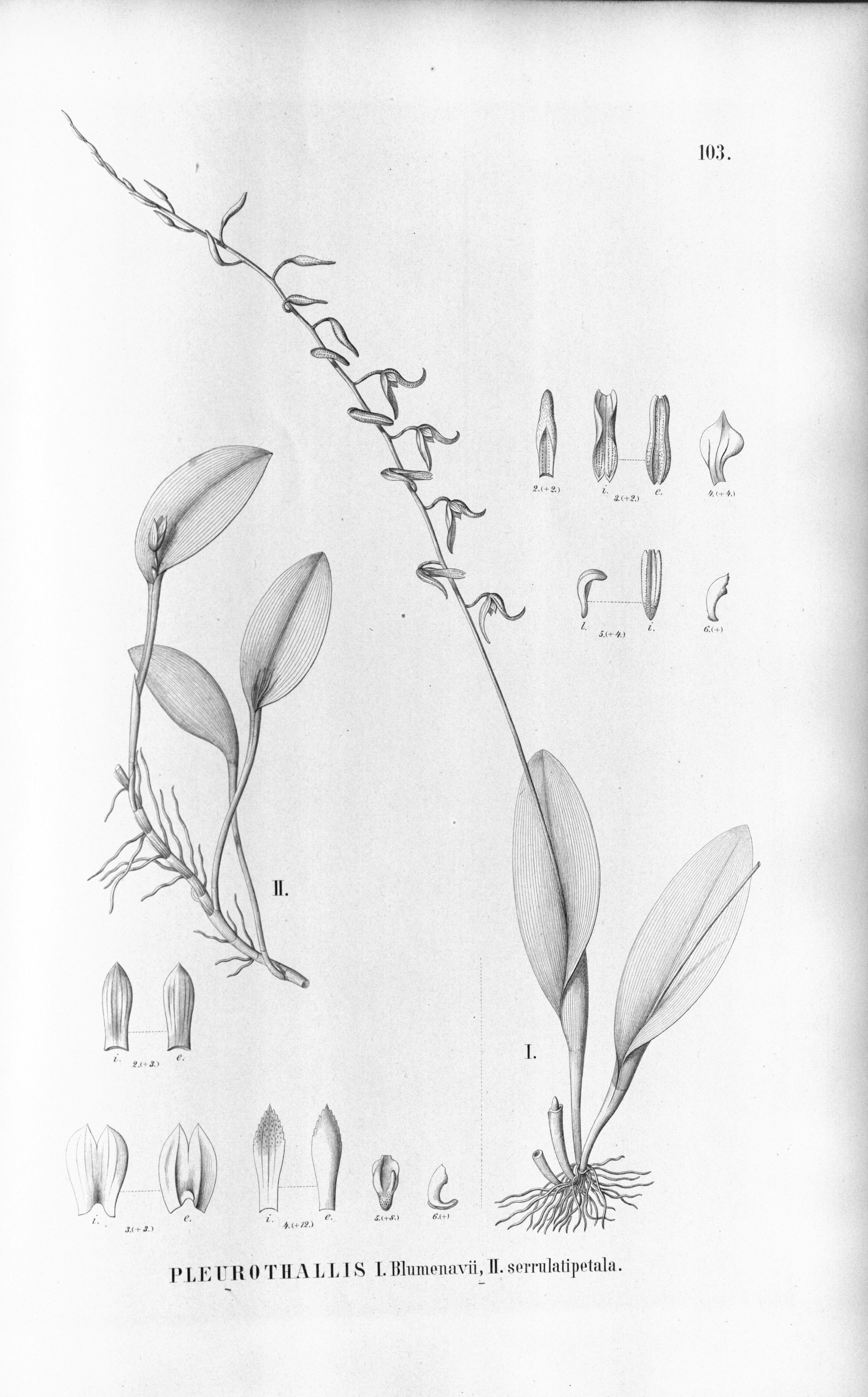
Illustration of I. Pabstiella alligatorifera (as syn. Pleurothallis blumenavii) II. Acianthera serrulatipetala (as syn. Pleurothallis serrulatipetala)

Pabstiella alligatorifera is a species of orchid plant native to Brazil.
