= Pabstiella wacketii =

Scientific classification
- Kingdom: Plantae
- Clade: Tracheophytes
- Clade: Angiosperms
- Clade: Monocots
- Order: Asparagales
- Family: Orchidaceae
- Subfamily: Epidendroideae
- Genus: Pabstiella
- Species: P. wacketii

Binomial name
- Pabstiella wacketii (Handro & Pabst) Luer

Synonyms
- Pleurothallis wacketii Handro & Pabst

Species of plant

Pabstiella wacketii is a species of orchid plant native to Brazil.
