= Palliser expedition =

19th-century research expedition in Canada

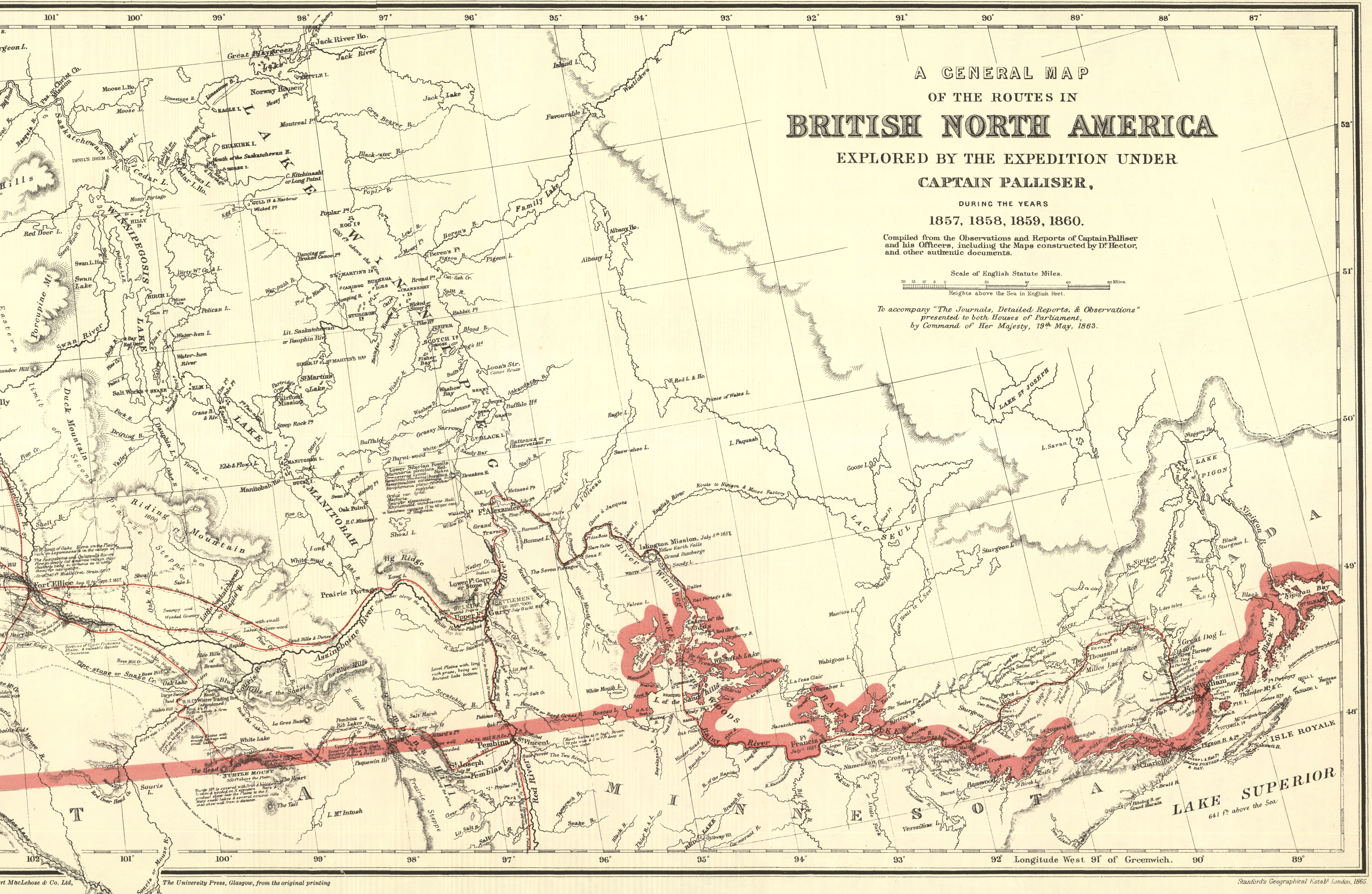
A Section of a General Map of the Routes in British North America Explored by the Expedition Under Captain Palliser (1865)

The Palliser expedition, officially the British North American Exploring Expedition, explored and surveyed the open prairies and rugged wilderness of western Canada from 1857 to 1860. The expedition was led by Irish-born explorer John Palliser, and accompanied by a party of four other men: James Hector, Eugène Bourgeau, Thomas Blakiston and John W. Sullivan. With the support of the British government and the Royal Geographical Society it became an official expedition with the stated purpose of gathering scientific information about the landscapes of British-claimed north-western North America (today's western Canada), in particular the territory of Rupert's Land, including information on the geography, climate, soil, flora and fauna, in order to discover its capabilities for settlement and transportation.

The expedition was the first detailed and scientific survey of the region between Lake Superior and the southern passes of the Rocky Mountains in British North America. The expedition provided a better understanding of the remote western frontier and the new observations and knowledge were significant for the expansion into and development of the western prairies by European settlers. The expedition's reports impacted changes in the economy, settlement, transportation, Indigenous communities and the campaign for expansionism in Canada.

== Participants ==
The party consisted of:

- John Palliser, geographer
- James Hector, geologist, naturalist, and surgeon
- Eugène Bourgeau, botanist
- Thomas Blakiston, magnetic observer
- John W. Sullivan, mathematician and sextant observer
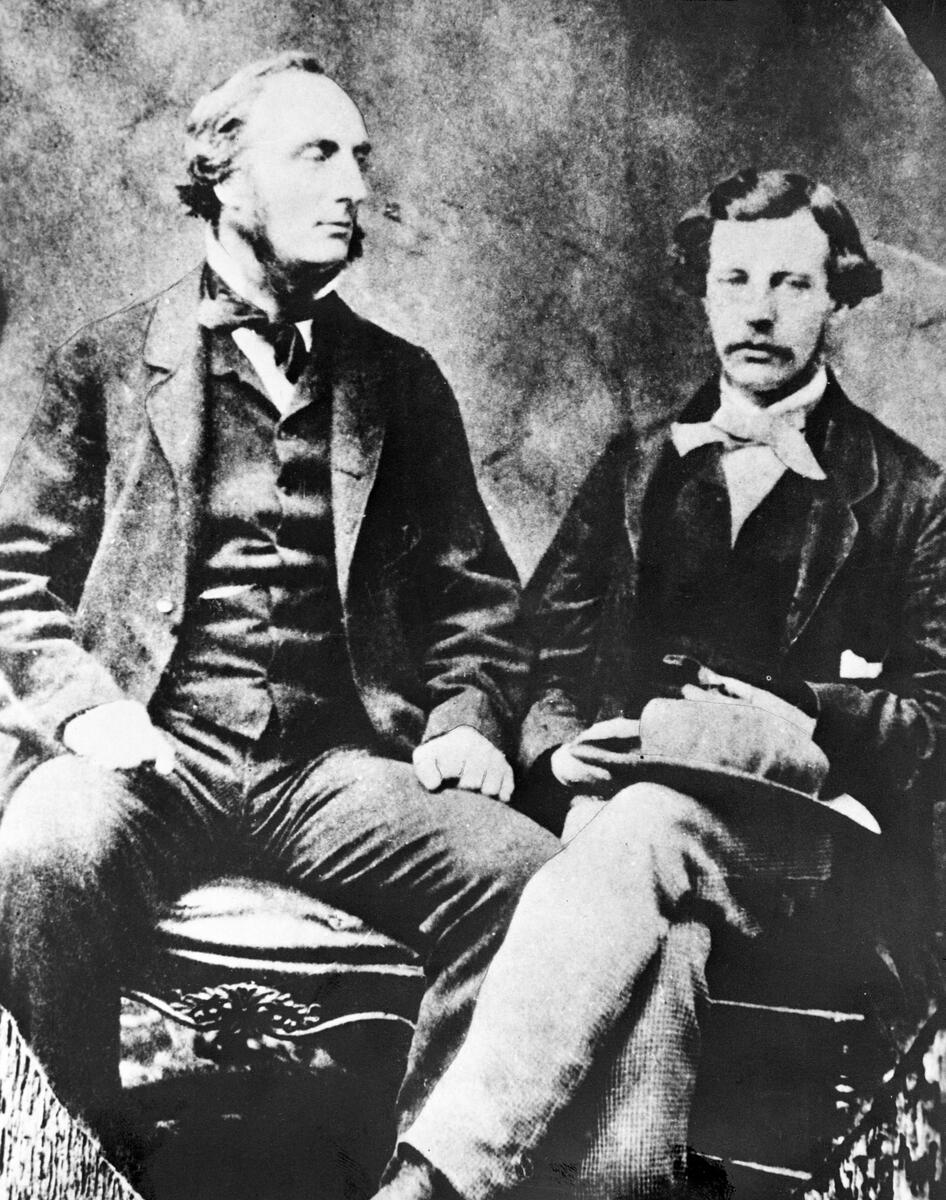
Captain John Palliser and James Hector

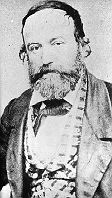
Eugène Bourgeau

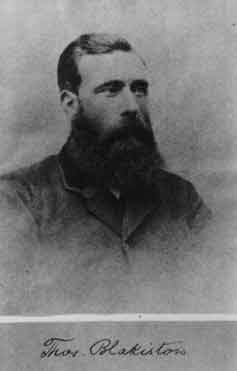
Thomas Wright Blakiston

As well, local guides and interpreters traveled with the party and assisted it in its work.

Such was Maskepetoon, later chief of a small Cree band. "In 1857 he was engaged by John Palliser’s expedition to act as guide from the Qu’Appelle lakes (near Fort Qu’Appelle) to the elbow of the South Saskatchewan River (near Elbow); from the expedition’s members he acquired the name Nichiwa, the Cree term for 'friend'."

== Background ==
=== Views of the West ===
With little information about the western prairies and the frontiers of European settlement in British North America, the basis of public knowledge prior to the expedition was largely speculation. There were two main views of the west at the time; one view, which had been the dominant perception leading up to 1856, depicted the region as a remote and barren wasteland, an excessively rugged wilderness that had little prospect for economically useful resources or settlement. With the increasing economic changes of the mid-19th century, the region began to be viewed differently, from the dominant landscapes to the growing potential for economic opportunities. This other view was the expansionist view, which became popular in 1856 and 1857 and viewed the uncharted territory in the west as a "promised land" with many possibilities for agricultural prosperity. With the expansionist view and the potential in the land, the western prairies began to also be seen as a place to settle and live as the barren and harsh wilderness was portrayed as a visionary countryside.

One of the earliest visionaries of western Canada was Arthur Dobbs, who saw the agricultural potential and fertile soils in the mid-18th century. Even with little information or supporting evidence regarding the land's potential, visions of the west were influential in portraying British North America as an untouched and unsettled wilderness full of opportunity. In the 1850s, the image of the west was influenced largely by the British government.

Thomas Devine created the first map of British North America's West in 1857, which showed the territories of the Hudson's Bay Company. The map described the land and its potential rather than focusing on the physical features of the landscape, and reflected the expansionist views of the west at the time. Expeditions such as Palliser's and Henry Youle Hind's were direct results of the expansionist campaign. With the increasing frequency of expeditions to the west, exploring the North West became more popular, specifically among young British men interested in experiencing the wilderness before it was taken over by settlers.

== Purpose ==
The western prairies had only been known by the few small Indigenous communities that lived there and the few British fur traders and missionaries, who themselves did not know much about the land. Some of the fur traders and explorers who had been through the area had collected and recorded information and maps; however, this information was often private and not easily accessible by the general public. In order to support the expansionists' claims of the promises that the west held, promising land needed to be found and publicly documented. Palliser and Hind's expeditions were results of increasing pressure by the British government to learn more about the west. Both the Canadian and British governments’ interest in the region and some of these possible opportunities of the land were responsible for their investment and involvement in further research and expeditions.

The purpose of the Palliser expedition was to explore three main areas: the land between Lake Superior and the Red River Colony, the land between the Red River Colony and the Rocky Mountains, and the land beyond the Rocky Mountains towards the Pacific Ocean along the continent's western coast. The route between Lake Superior and Red River connected trading posts and was used by the Hudson's Bay Company for some travel. The route had been used frequently by the HBC for trading furs by canoe before 1821. While the pass had not been originally part of the expedition, John Ball wanted a neutral perspective of the company's route to determine if it could be reliably used by travellers and for transporting goods as a connecting route to Canada. Palliser and his party also examined a route called White Fish River to see where the Kaministikwia River connected to the main river and determine if it could be used for transportation purposes or as another possible pass from Canada to the prairies. Palliser had seen major waterways facilitating transportation in Mississippi and Missouri and saw the potential for connecting the Red River Colony to Canada.

In collecting accurate and detailed information about the land the party was travelling through, they recorded the different landscapes and terrains from bodies of water to forests and mountains.

== Forming the expedition ==
While some explorers had travelled from Red River out west, many followed routes along the Saskatchewan River that had long been used by fur traders. Palliser became aware of the existence of other routes, primarily used by indigenous communities. In 1848, Palliser met James Sinclair, a Métis explorer with the HBC, who told Palliser about another pass which was off the route from the Red River Colony to the Rocky Mountains and along the United States border. In 1856, Palliser's interest in the western prairies initiated his plan to explore western Canada along the American border on a formal expedition. His interest in some of these alternative routes became an idea for a project that could be used to survey the land and provide information about the uncharted region. His project was proposed to the Royal Geographical Society, which was involved in coordinating research expeditions and worked with the government to help fund some of them, after he was elected as a member of the society on November 24, 1856. Through the society, the Expedition Committee approved Palliser's proposal, but recommended that the expedition include the help of professional scientists who were able to conduct scientific research that could be used to better understand the land, as Palliser himself did not have any formal training. Under the recommendation of John Ball, who was the parliamentary under-secretary of state for the colonies during 1856, the British government provided funding towards the expedition of £5,000. Given the government's interest in the same region, they accepted the proposal and provided funding and support for the expedition. The government's involvement was a recognition of the desire and need for development and expansion in the west. While the expedition started out, in Palliser's vision, as a one-man expedition exploring the west, it quickly became a legitimate, carefully organized and well-funded expedition through connections to influential and authoritative people and organizations.

John Ball helped organize the group of men to accompany Palliser on the expedition. The men that made up the expedition were trained scientists of various fields. James Hector was a geologist, naturalist and physician. Other members of the British party were Eugène Bourgeau, who had made many contributions in botanical work; Thomas Wright Blakiston, a geographer and magnetical observer; and John W. Sullivan, a mathematician and sextant observer, who was also the secretary for the expedition and responsible for astronomical observations.

== Expedition routes ==
=== Timeline ===
Palliser, Hector, Bourgeau, and Sullivan sailed for New York on 16 May 1857.

==== 1857 ====
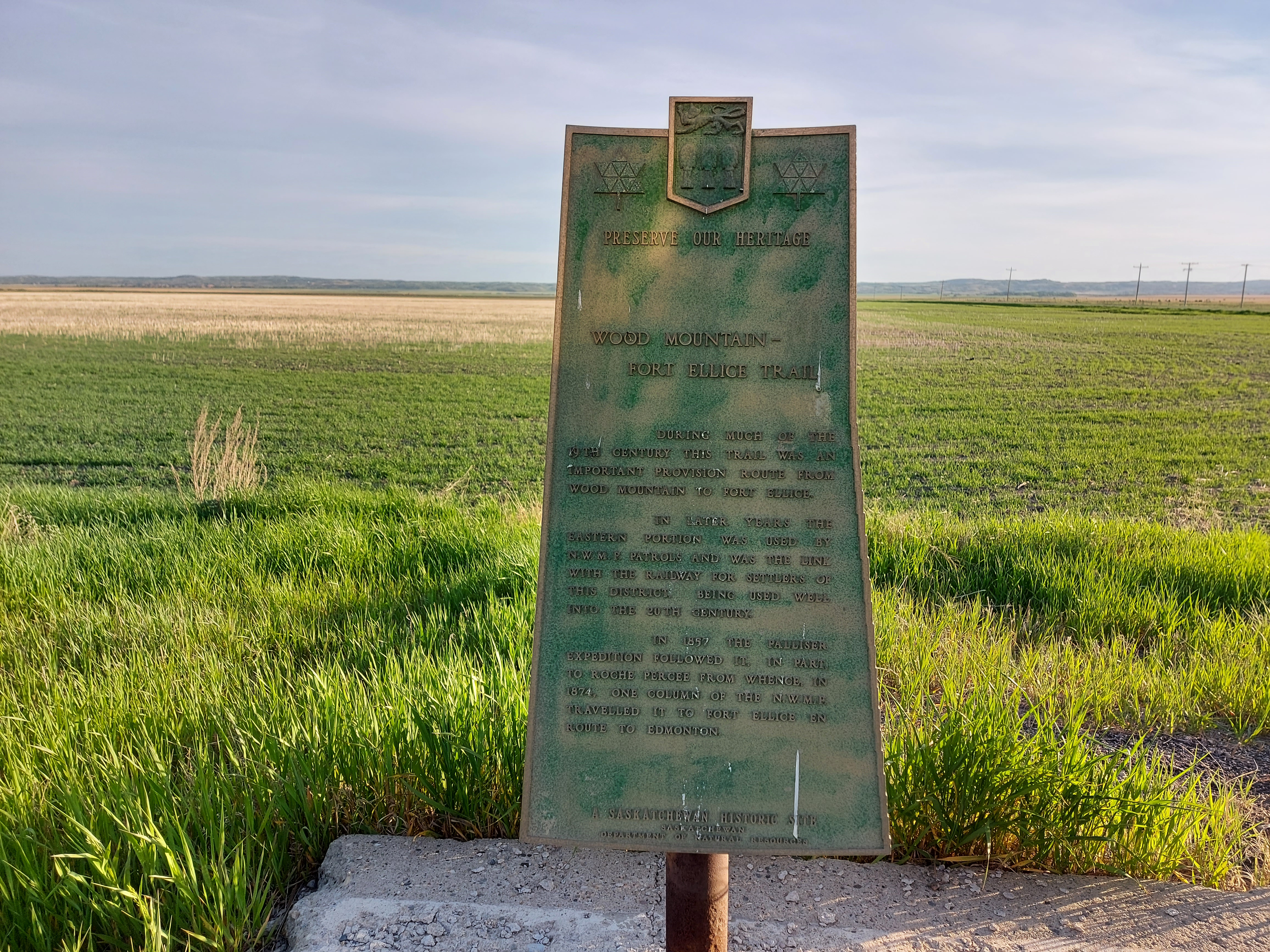
A plaque in Arcola, Saskatchewan, commemorating the Palliser Expedition, as well as the March West and the Fort Ellice-Wood Mountain Trail.

In May 1857, Palliser and the group of men began the expedition. They sailed from Sault Ste Marie by steamship across Lake Superior and Lake Huron. They continued by canoes and by June 12 they had almost reached Isle Royale and continued through Thunder Bay, across the Kaministikwia River and into Fort William, the starting point of the routes they had set out to explore; the first stretch of land was between Lake Superior and Red River. The expedition continued with horses and carts, with supplies provided by the HBC. At Red River Palliser employed a number of Métis guides to assist on the trip west. These guides also acted as interpreters, scouts and armed escorts.

In June 1857, the party explored White Fish River to determine the river connections and potential usage of the waterways along with the help of three local Ojibwas. They travelled from Thunder Bay up the Kaministiquia River, climbed Mountain Portage, stopped at the Priest's Portage and crossed nine other portages.

They continued via the Red River and across the prairies. They met Charles W. Iddings, an American surveyor, along the United States border. The expedition continued through Turtle Mountain, Fort Ellice, Roche Percée, along the South Saskatchewan River to Fort Carlton, then along the North Saskatchewan River, where they spent the winter of 1857/1858.

==== 1858 ====
In the spring they marched west, and searched for mountain crossings west of modern-day Irricana. Palliser and Sullivan mapped the North Kananaskis Pass and North Kootenay Pass before returning to Fort Edmonton for the winter. Hector crossed the Vermilion Pass and discovered the Kicking Horse Pass. During the winter, Palliser, Captain Arthur Brisco and William Roland Mitchell went south to Rocky Mountain House to meet the Blackfoot and Northern Peigan First Nations.

==== 1859 ====
In 1859, the expedition mapped the confluence of the Red Deer River and South Saskatchewan River, as well as the Cypress Hills, before turning again west. Hector crossed the Rockies through the Howse Pass, and tried unsuccessfully to push through to the Pacific Coast. Palliser and Sullivan crossed the mountains through the North Kootenay Pass and continued down the Kootenay River to Fort Colville, which by then was on American soil as a result of the Oregon Treaty of 1846 and placement of the boundary at the 49th parallel.

Sullivan explored the Columbia River and its tributaries as far west as the Okanogan Valley, while Palliser crossed over land to Midway, BC. Unable to find passes to the Pacific north of the 49th parallel, they reunited with Hector in Fort Colvile. From there, they travelled 598 miles (962 km) downstream on the Columbia River to Fort Vancouver and the Pacific Coast, then north to Fort Victoria. The expedition returned to the East Coast by ship through San Francisco and Panama (where they had to go overland to reach a ship to travel in the Atlantic), then to Montreal. From there, they finally sailed back to Liverpool.

== Role of science in expansion ==
The science that was used in this expedition in the surveying of the land and information that was gathered was significant in the types of agriculture that could be grown and opportunities for settlement and transportation. The expedition collected and filed astronomical, meteorological, geological and magnetic data, described the fauna and flora of the lands crossed, as well as considerations regarding settlement and transportation. The research conducted on the expeditions by Hind and Palliser began to redefine the landscape of western British North America in its topography and the differences in the atmosphere. The party recorded longitude and latitude points, altitudes, chronometer rates, variations of the compass, collected different types of plants, recorded measures of the rivers, and observed the various geographical terrains and characteristics of the landscapes. The measurements were compared to previous information and recording of the land by other explorers and scientists in recent years. They looked at existing agricultural development in the soil and the kinds of vegetation being grown in some regions.

== Impact ==
=== Expansionist campaign and the economy ===
Two of the main areas that were discovered on the expedition were the stretch of land which is known now as the fertile belt for the prosperous soil between Red River and the Saskatchewan River Valley and the Rockies. The second expanse of land is through the prairies and extends across the American border, and has become known as Palliser's triangle. They reported to the government that this region was too arid for subsistence agriculture, a finding that was overruled by later officials. That was much to the detriment of those who tried to farm there, particularly when homesteading was encouraged by government grants of land From surveying the land, large amounts of fertile land were found which contributed to the change from an economy built around fur-trading to agriculture. The knowledge and plans for western British North America became more clear after Palliser and Hind's expeditions, with the detailed records and observations they were able to create a more accurate representation and understanding of the west. After three years of publishing details of the expedition, Palliser presented his report to the British Parliament in 1863. A comprehensive map of the surveyed areas was published in 1865. They concluded that transport through American territory was more feasible. While they found several passes suitable for crossing the Rocky Mountains, they were prevented from proceeding to the Pacific by mountains further west. From this better understanding and supported evidence of promising land and opportunities, work on expanding the west, settlement and connecting Canada to the west through additions to transportation. One of the passes that that party explored on their expedition was later used for transportation purposes, as the Canadian Pacific Railway built through part of it. The opportunities that the land provided became a priority. In connecting the west with Canada, by 1870 agriculture was becoming the main focus and resource in the western prairies, though trading fur continued to be part of the economy. Palliser and Hind's expeditions and the research they conducted and the information that they contributed led to the western prairies being divided into regions based on the geography, climate, soil and agricultural potential.

=== Settlement and Indigenous communities ===
The transition in the economic sectors from fur trading to agricultural created more development in western Canada, with a growing population of European settlers. The large presence of European settlers in the west made them a large economic power and created conflict with Indigenous communities in the region. The changes in the economy as a result of this expansion were very rapid and had affected the Metis and Indigenous people as they experienced a shift in their economic, political and cultural control over their communities. Within the 1870s, the foundation of the economy in western Canada was broken down with the isolation and separation from the rest of Canada, and systems of power among Indigenous communities. The disappearance of the buffalo led to the Indigenous communities becoming more reliant on European settlers and the government as they lost their main resource of economic dependency and began selling their land and moving on to reserves.
