= Pabstiella truncicola =

Scientific classification
- Kingdom: Plantae
- Clade: Tracheophytes
- Clade: Angiosperms
- Clade: Monocots
- Order: Asparagales
- Family: Orchidaceae
- Subfamily: Epidendroideae
- Genus: Pabstiella
- Species: P. truncicola

Binomial name
- Pabstiella truncicola (Rchb.f.) Luer

Synonyms
- Pleurothallis truncicola Rchb.f.

Species of plant

Pabstiella truncicola is a species of orchid plant native to Brazil.
