= Pabstiella trifida =

Scientific classification
- Kingdom: Plantae
- Clade: Tracheophytes
- Clade: Angiosperms
- Clade: Monocots
- Order: Asparagales
- Family: Orchidaceae
- Subfamily: Epidendroideae
- Genus: Pabstiella
- Species: P. trifida

Binomial name
- Pabstiella trifida (Lindl.) Luer

Synonyms
- Pleurothallis bicristata Cogn.; Pleurothallis curtii Schltr.; Pleurothallis trifida Lindl.

Species of orchid

Pabstiella trifida is a species of orchid plant.
