= Pabstiella elegantula =

Scientific classification
- Kingdom: Plantae
- Clade: Tracheophytes
- Clade: Angiosperms
- Clade: Monocots
- Order: Asparagales
- Family: Orchidaceae
- Subfamily: Epidendroideae
- Genus: Pabstiella
- Species: P. elegantula

Binomial name
- Pabstiella elegantula (Cogn.) Luer

Synonyms
- Pleurothallis avenacea Ames

Species of plant

Pabstiella elegantula is a species of orchid and is native to Brazil.
