= Pabstiella curti-bradei =

Scientific classification
- Kingdom: Plantae
- Clade: Tracheophytes
- Clade: Angiosperms
- Clade: Monocots
- Order: Asparagales
- Family: Orchidaceae
- Subfamily: Epidendroideae
- Genus: Pabstiella
- Species: P. curti-bradei

Binomial name
- Pabstiella curti-bradei (Pabst) Luer

Synonyms
- Pleurothallis curti-bradei Pabst

Species of plant

Pabstiella curti-bradei is a species of orchid plant native to Brazil.
