= Pabstiella uniflora =

Scientific classification
- Kingdom: Plantae
- Clade: Tracheophytes
- Clade: Angiosperms
- Clade: Monocots
- Order: Asparagales
- Family: Orchidaceae
- Subfamily: Epidendroideae
- Genus: Pabstiella
- Species: P. uniflora

Binomial name
- Pabstiella uniflora (Lindl.) Luer

Synonyms
- Humboltia leontoglossa (Rchb.f.) Kuntze; Humboltia uniflora (Lindl.) Kuntze; Lepanthes punctata Barb.Rodr.; Lepanthes striata Barb.Rodr.; Lepanthes umbrosa Barb.Rodr.; Pabstiella punctata (Barb.Rodr.) Luer & Toscano; Pleurothallis guttulata Cogn.; Pleurothallis leontoglossa Rchb.f.; Pleurothallis umbrosa (Barb.Rodr.) Cogn.; Pleurothallis uniflora Lindl.; Specklinia leontoglossa (Rchb.f.) Luer; Specklinia uniflora (Lindl.) Pridgeon & M.W.Chase

Species of plant

Pabstiella uniflora is a species of orchid plant native to Ecuador.
