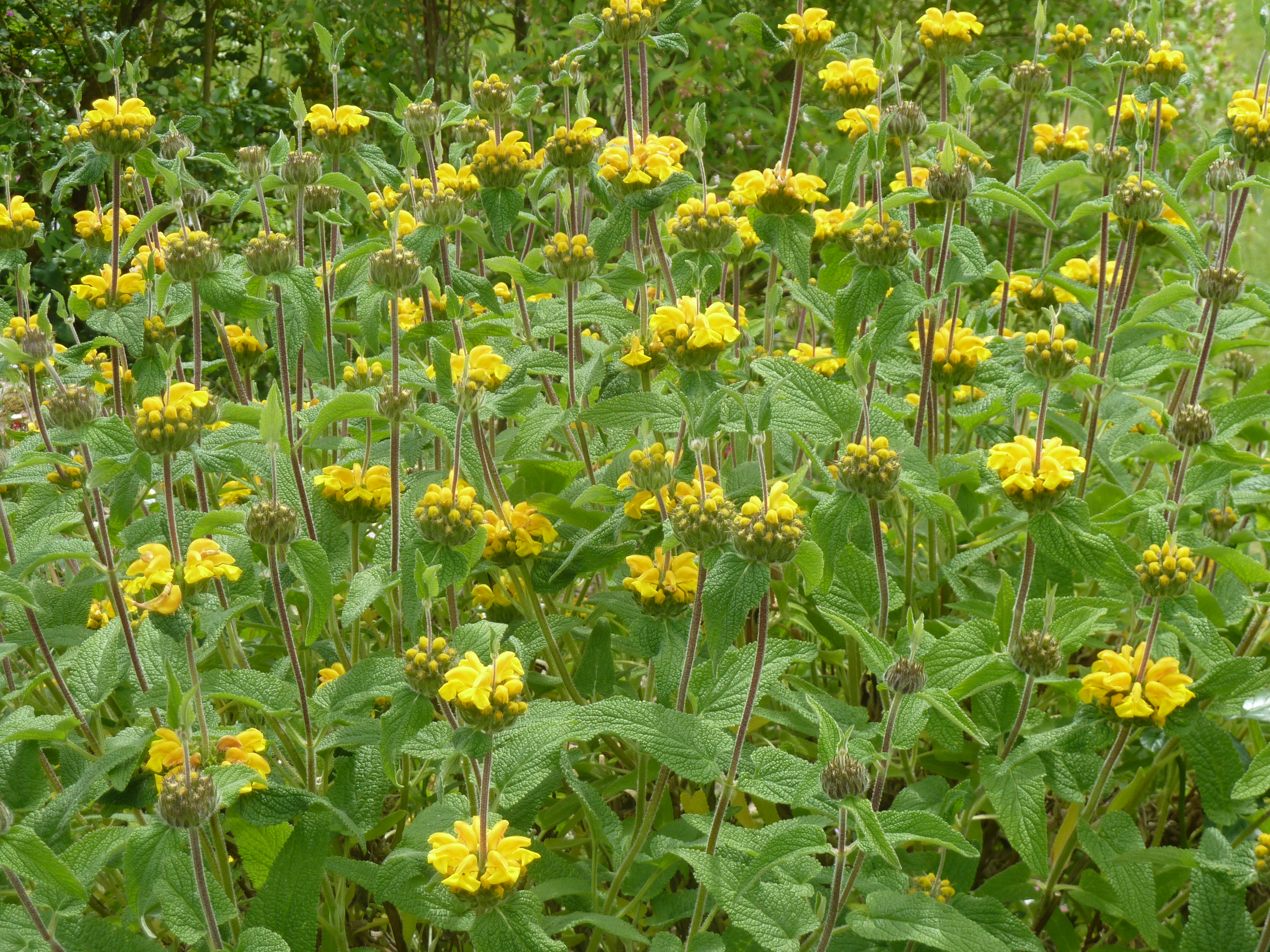

Scientific classification
- Kingdom: Plantae
- Clade: Tracheophytes
- Clade: Angiosperms
- Clade: Eudicots
- Clade: Asterids
- Order: Lamiales
- Family: Lamiaceae
- Genus: Phlomis
- Species: P. longifolia

Binomial name
- Phlomis longifolia Boiss. & C.I.Blanche

Synonyms
- Phlomis bailanica Vierh.; Phlomis bertramii Post

= Phlomis longifolia =

Species of flowering plant

Phlomis longifolia, the long-leaved Jerusalem sage, is a species of flowering plant in the mint and sage family Lamiaceae, native to the hills of Cyprus, Turkey and Lebanon.

Growing to 100 cm (39 in) tall and broad, this small evergreen shrub has felted green sage-like leaves; and, in summer, bright yellow flowers on erect stems. Hardy to −10 °C (14 °F), it requires full sun and well-drained soil.

The Royal Horticultural Society has given its Award of Garden Merit to the variety Phlomis longifolia var. bailanica.
