= Pabstiella arcuata =

Scientific classification
- Kingdom: Plantae
- Clade: Embryophytes
- Clade: Tracheophytes
- Clade: Angiosperms
- Clade: Monocots
- Order: Asparagales
- Family: Orchidaceae
- Subfamily: Epidendroideae
- Genus: Pabstiella
- Species: P. arcuata

Binomial name
- Pabstiella arcuata (Lindl.) Luer

Synonyms
- Pleurothallis arcuata Lindl.

Species of orchid

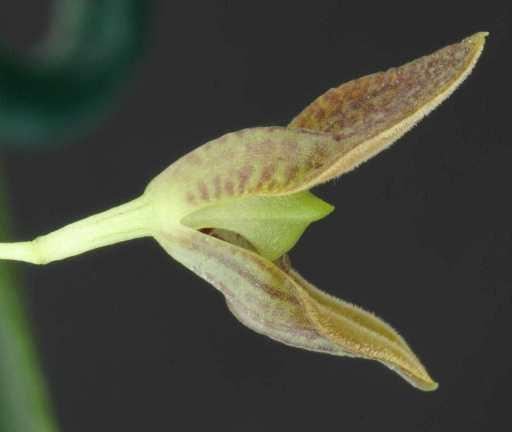
Orchid

Pabstiella arcuata is a species of orchid plant native to Brazil.
