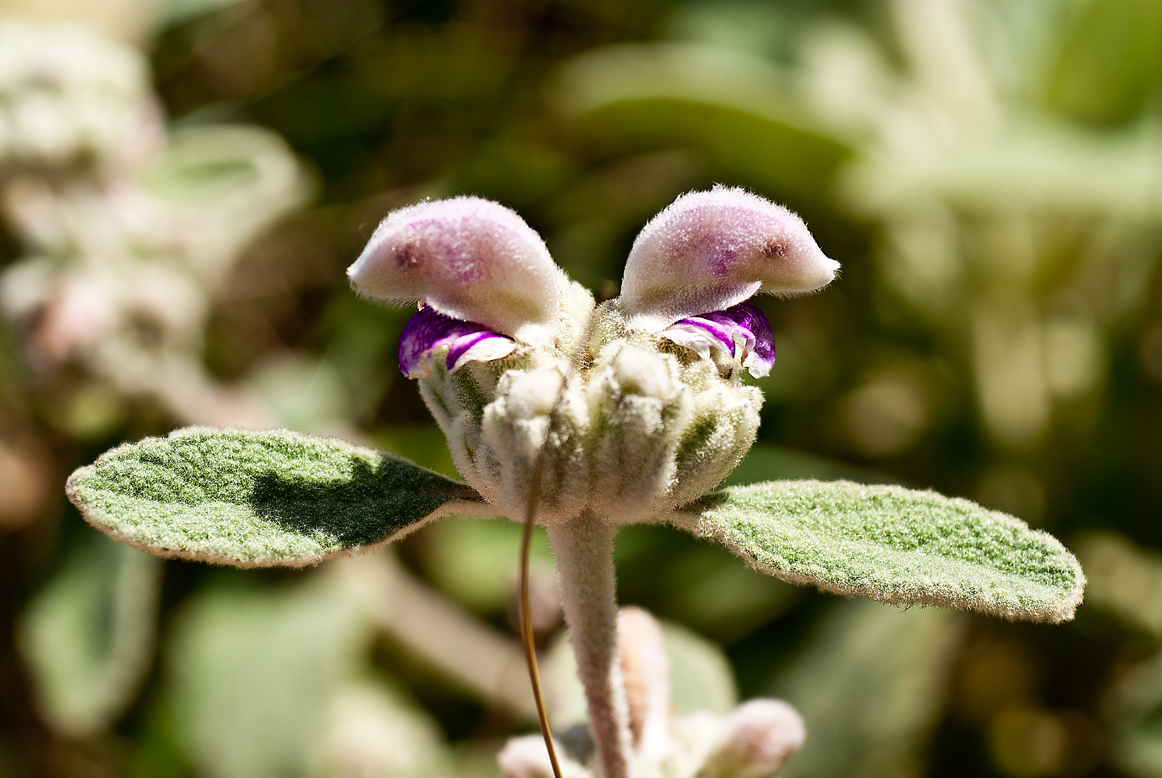

Scientific classification
- Kingdom: Plantae
- Clade: Tracheophytes
- Clade: Angiosperms
- Clade: Eudicots
- Clade: Asterids
- Order: Lamiales
- Family: Lamiaceae
- Genus: Phlomis
- Species: P. italica

Binomial name
- Phlomis italica L.

= Phlomis italica =

Species of flowering plant

Phlomis italica, the Balearic Island sage, is a species of flowering plant in the mint and sage family Lamiaceae, native to the Balearic Islands of Spain, and cultivated as a temperate ornamental plant. It is an evergreen shrub with large, oval, woolly grey-green leaves. In summer, circles of pale pink flowers appear at intervals along the erect stems. The height and spread is 50–100 cm (20–39 in). Though hardy, it prefers a sheltered position in full sun.
