= Pabstiella versicolor =

Scientific classification
- Kingdom: Plantae
- Clade: Tracheophytes
- Clade: Angiosperms
- Clade: Monocots
- Order: Asparagales
- Family: Orchidaceae
- Subfamily: Epidendroideae
- Genus: Pabstiella
- Species: P. versicolor

Binomial name
- Pabstiella versicolor (Porsch) Luer

Synonyms
- Pleurothallis podoglossa Hoehne; Pleurothallis versicolor Porsch

Species of plant

Pabstiella versicolor is a species of orchid plant native to Brazil.
