= Pabstiella calcarata =

Scientific classification
- Kingdom: Plantae
- Clade: Tracheophytes
- Clade: Angiosperms
- Clade: Monocots
- Order: Asparagales
- Family: Orchidaceae
- Subfamily: Epidendroideae
- Genus: Pabstiella
- Species: P. calcarata

Binomial name
- Pabstiella calcarata (Cogn.) Luer

Species of orchid

Pabstiella calcarata is a species of orchid native to Central and South America.
