= Pabstiella aurantiaca =

Scientific classification
- Kingdom: Plantae
- Clade: Tracheophytes
- Clade: Angiosperms
- Clade: Monocots
- Order: Asparagales
- Family: Orchidaceae
- Subfamily: Epidendroideae
- Genus: Pabstiella
- Species: P. aurantiaca

Binomial name
- Pabstiella aurantiaca (Barb.Rodr.) Chiron

Synonyms
- Pleurothallis aurantiaca Barb.Rodr.

Species of orchid

Pabstiella aurantiaca is a species of orchid plant.
