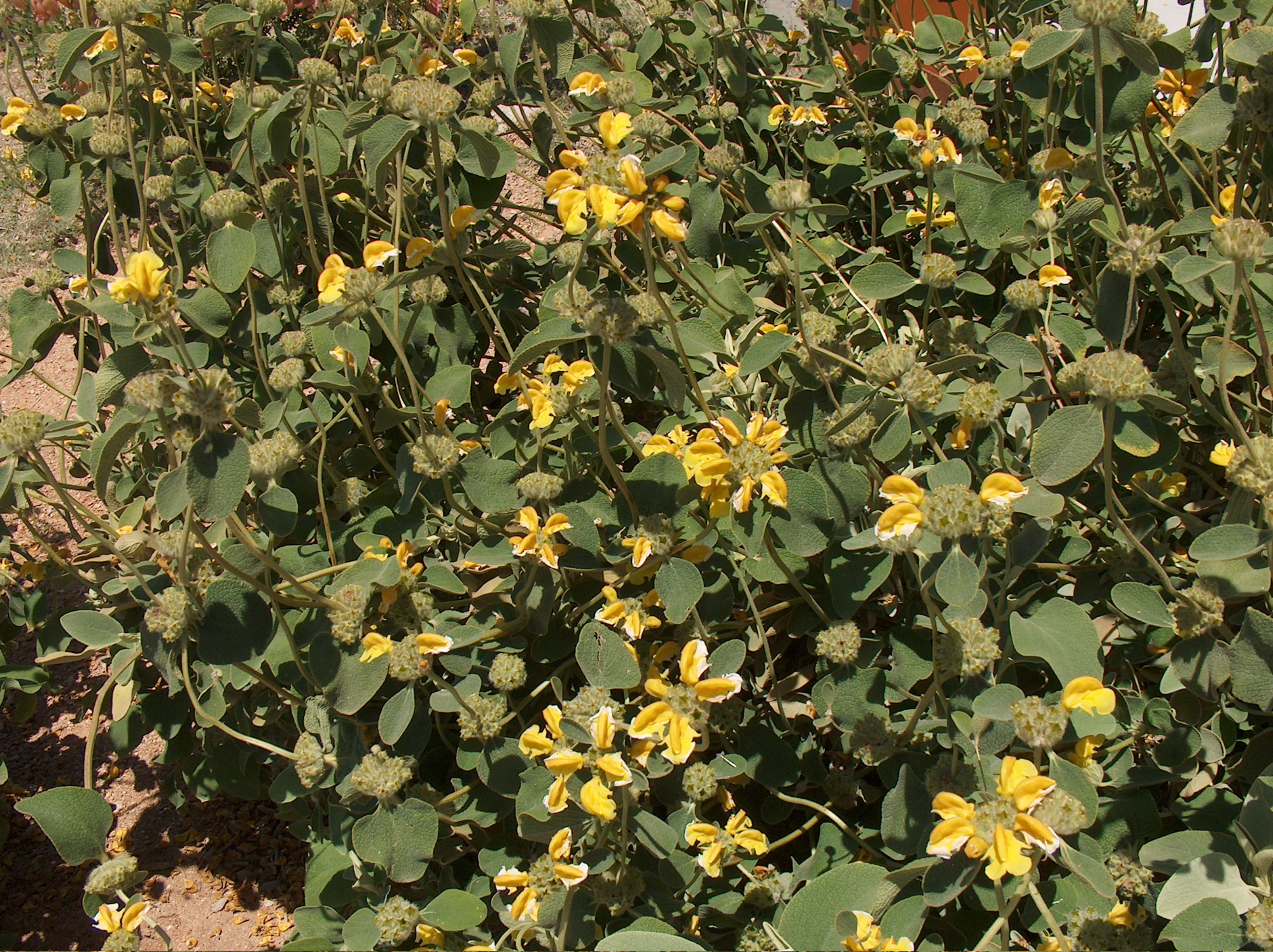

Scientific classification
- Kingdom: Plantae
- Clade: Embryophytes
- Clade: Tracheophytes
- Clade: Angiosperms
- Clade: Eudicots
- Clade: Asterids
- Order: Lamiales
- Family: Lamiaceae
- Genus: Phlomis
- Species: P. chrysophylla

Binomial name
- Phlomis chrysophylla Boiss.

= Phlomis chrysophylla =

Species of flowering plant in the sage family

Phlomis chrysophylla, the golden-leaved Jerusalem sage, is a species of flowering plant in the family Lamiaceae, native to southwest Asia. It is an evergreen shrub growing to 1 m (3 ft) tall by 1.2 m (4 ft) wide, with woolly-textured, sage-like leaves that turn lime green with age, and yellow flowers carried in the leaf axils in early summer.

The specific epithet chrysophylla means "golden-leaved".

In cultivation it requires some protection in winter. It has gained the Royal Horticultural Society's Award of Garden Merit.
