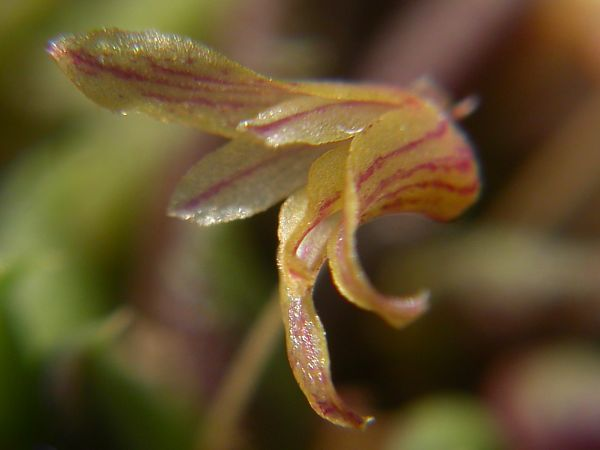

Scientific classification
- Kingdom: Plantae
- Clade: Tracheophytes
- Clade: Angiosperms
- Clade: Monocots
- Order: Asparagales
- Family: Orchidaceae
- Subfamily: Epidendroideae
- Genus: Pabstiella
- Species: P. aveniformis

Binomial name
- Pabstiella aveniformis (Hoehne) C.N. Gonç. & Waechter (2004)

Synonyms
- Pleurothallis aveniformis; Specklinia aveniformis; Acianthera aveniformis

= Pabstiella aveniformis =

Species of orchid

Pabstiella aveniformis is a species of orchid.
