= Pabstiella wanderbildtiana =

Scientific classification
- Kingdom: Plantae
- Clade: Tracheophytes
- Clade: Angiosperms
- Clade: Monocots
- Order: Asparagales
- Family: Orchidaceae
- Subfamily: Epidendroideae
- Genus: Pabstiella
- Species: P. wanderbildtiana

Binomial name
- Pabstiella wanderbildtiana (Pabst) F.Barros & C.F.Hall

Synonyms
- Pleurothallis wanderbildtiana Pabst

Species of plant

Pabstiella wanderbildtiana is a species of orchid plant native to Brazil.
