= Pabstiella trimeropetala =

Scientific classification
- Kingdom: Plantae
- Clade: Tracheophytes
- Clade: Angiosperms
- Clade: Monocots
- Order: Asparagales
- Family: Orchidaceae
- Subfamily: Epidendroideae
- Genus: Pabstiella
- Species: P. trimeropetala

Binomial name
- Pabstiella trimeropetala (Pabst) Luer

Synonyms
- Pleurothallis trimeropetala Pabst

Species of orchid

Pabstiella trimeropetala is a species of orchid plant native to Brazil.
