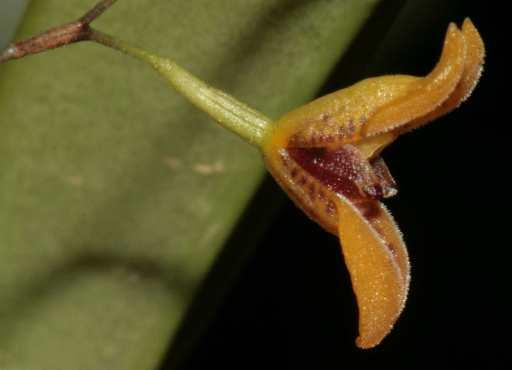

Scientific classification
- Kingdom: Plantae
- Clade: Tracheophytes
- Clade: Angiosperms
- Clade: Monocots
- Order: Asparagales
- Family: Orchidaceae
- Subfamily: Epidendroideae
- Genus: Pabstiella
- Species: P. wawraeana

Binomial name
- Pabstiella wawraeana (Barb.Rodr.) Chiron & Xim.Bols.

Synonyms
- Lepanthes wawraeana Barb.Rodr.; Pleurothallis cuneifolia Cogn.

= Pabstiella wawraeana =

Species of orchid

Pabstiella wawraeana is a species of orchid native to southern Brazil.
