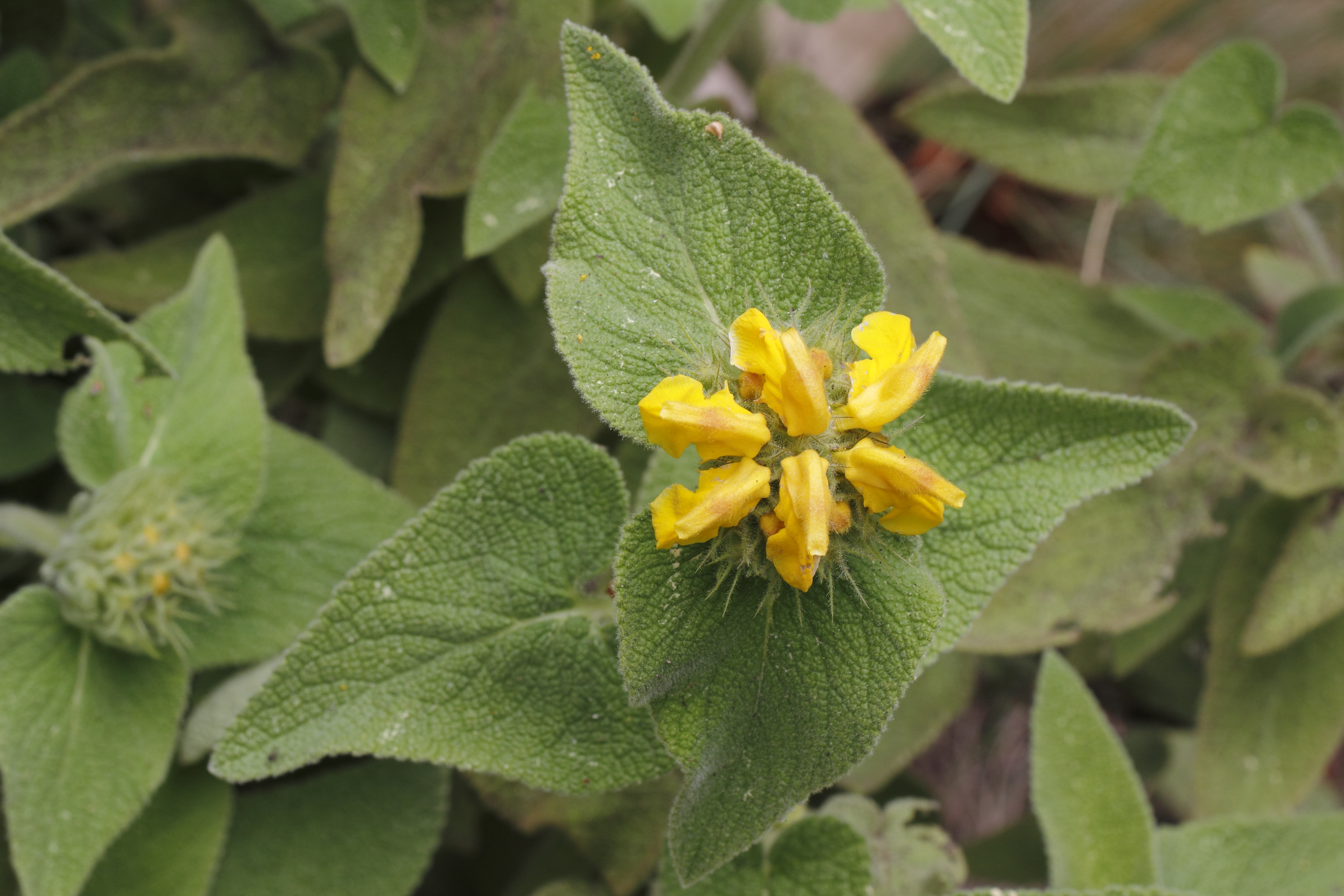
- Phlomis bourgaei, flowers and leaves

Scientific classification
- Kingdom: Plantae
- Clade: Embryophytes
- Clade: Tracheophytes
- Clade: Angiosperms
- Clade: Eudicots
- Clade: Asterids
- Order: Lamiales
- Family: Lamiaceae
- Genus: Phlomis
- Species: P. bourgaei

Binomial name
- Phlomis bourgaei Boiss.

Synonyms
- Phlomis schwarzii P.H.Davis

= Phlomis bourgaei =

Species of flowering plant in the sage family

Phlomis bourgaei, the puckered gray-green Turkish phlomis, is a species of flowering plant in the family Lamiaceae, native to East Aegean Islands to South West Turkey.

The specific epithet bourgaei is a taxonomic patronym honouring the French botanical traveller Eugène Bourgeau (1813–1877), who collected in Anatolia, North Africa, and North America.

== Description ==
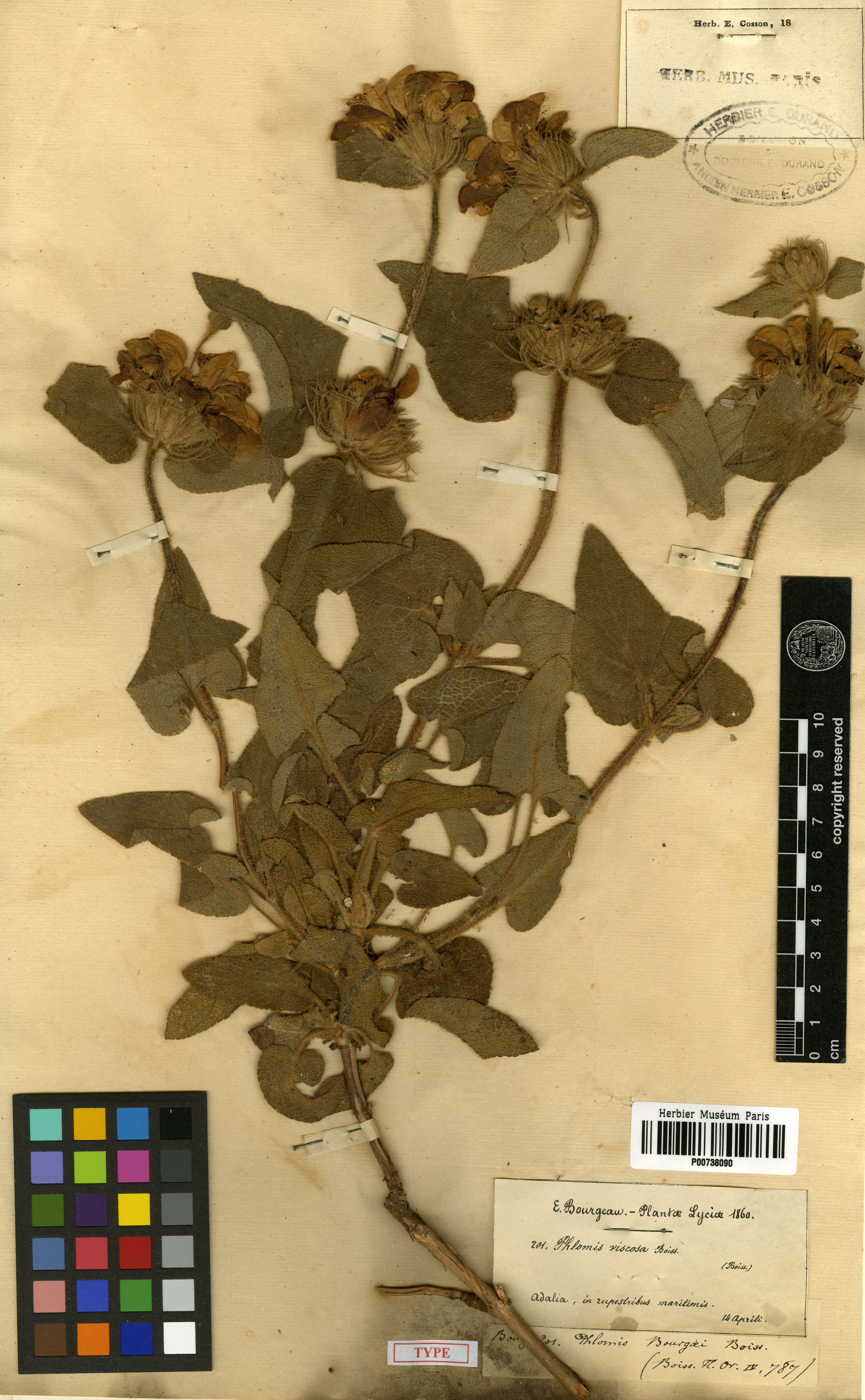
Herbarium specimen of Phlomis bourgaei, collected by Eugène Bourgeau in 1860

It is a shrub, evergreen, growing to 1 m (3 ft) tall by 80 cm (3 ft) wide. The foliage shows a pronounced seasonal dimorphism. In winter and spring, the large, gray-green leaves develop horizontally to maximize photosynthesis during the growing period. In summer, after the flowering, the big leaves fall and the plant then produces a new generation of smaller, undulated leaves, compressed against each other along the stems to reduce the area of sun exposure and limit evapotranspiration. These new leaves are covered with a thick coat of wooly, golden brown hairs.

The flowers are yellow with 20–30 mm corolla, appear in April–May, and are carried in the leaf axils.

In the wild, P. bourgaei grows in shrublands, oak scrubs, and pine woods, on serpentine and calcareous rocks. In cultivation it requires a well-drained soil and an exposure with sun or partial shade, and tolerates limestone.

== Hybrids ==
- Phlomis × termessi Davis (Phlomis bourgaei Boiss. × Phlomis lycia D. Don)
