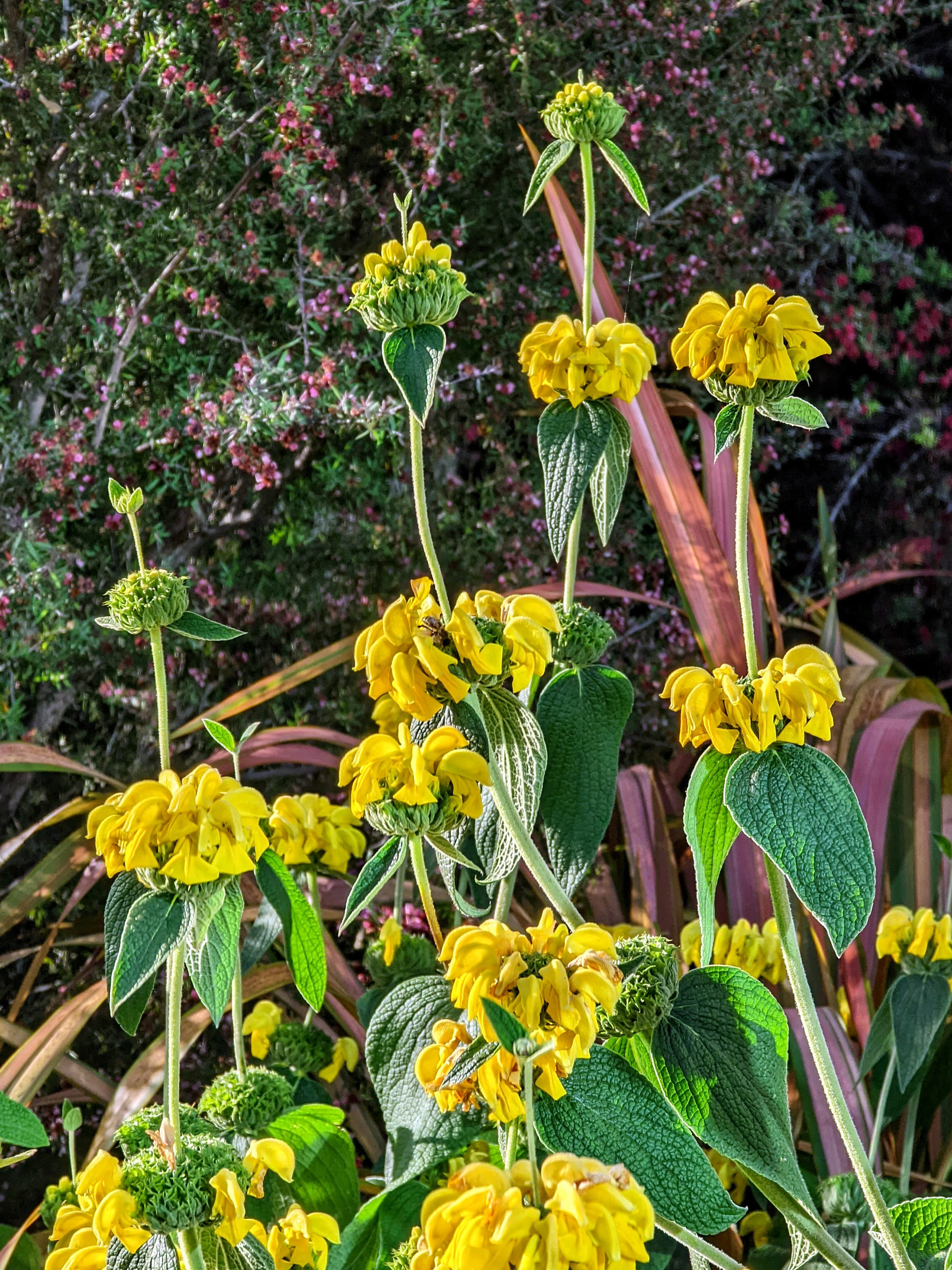

Scientific classification
- Kingdom: Plantae
- Clade: Tracheophytes
- Clade: Angiosperms
- Clade: Eudicots
- Clade: Asterids
- Order: Lamiales
- Family: Lamiaceae
- Genus: Phlomis
- Species: P. russeliana

Binomial name
- Phlomis russeliana (Sims) Lag. ex Benth.

Synonyms
- Phlomis lunariifolia var. russeliana Sims

= Phlomis russeliana =

Species of flowering plant

Phlomis russeliana, Turkish sage, is a species of flowering plant in the family Lamiaceae, native to Turkey and Syria in south west Asia. It is often confused with the closely related P. samia, and wrongly marketed as Phlomis viscosa. Growing to 1 m (3.3 ft) tall, it is a herbaceous perennial with hairy, erect stems. The textured, grey-green, sage-like leaves are arrow shaped, and point downwards. In summer, whorls of green buds develop in the leaf axils at regular intervals up each vertical stem, giving a distinctive tiered effect. The buds open to globose clusters of dull yellow hooded flowers.

Phlomis russeliana is cultivated as an ornamental garden flower, in moist soil in full sun. It is hardy in all temperate zones down to −20 °C (−4 °F). The flowers are long-lasting, the dried flower-heads providing architectural interest throughout the winter months, as well as multiple seeds for propagation in the early spring. It has been given the Royal Horticultural Society's Award of Garden Merit.

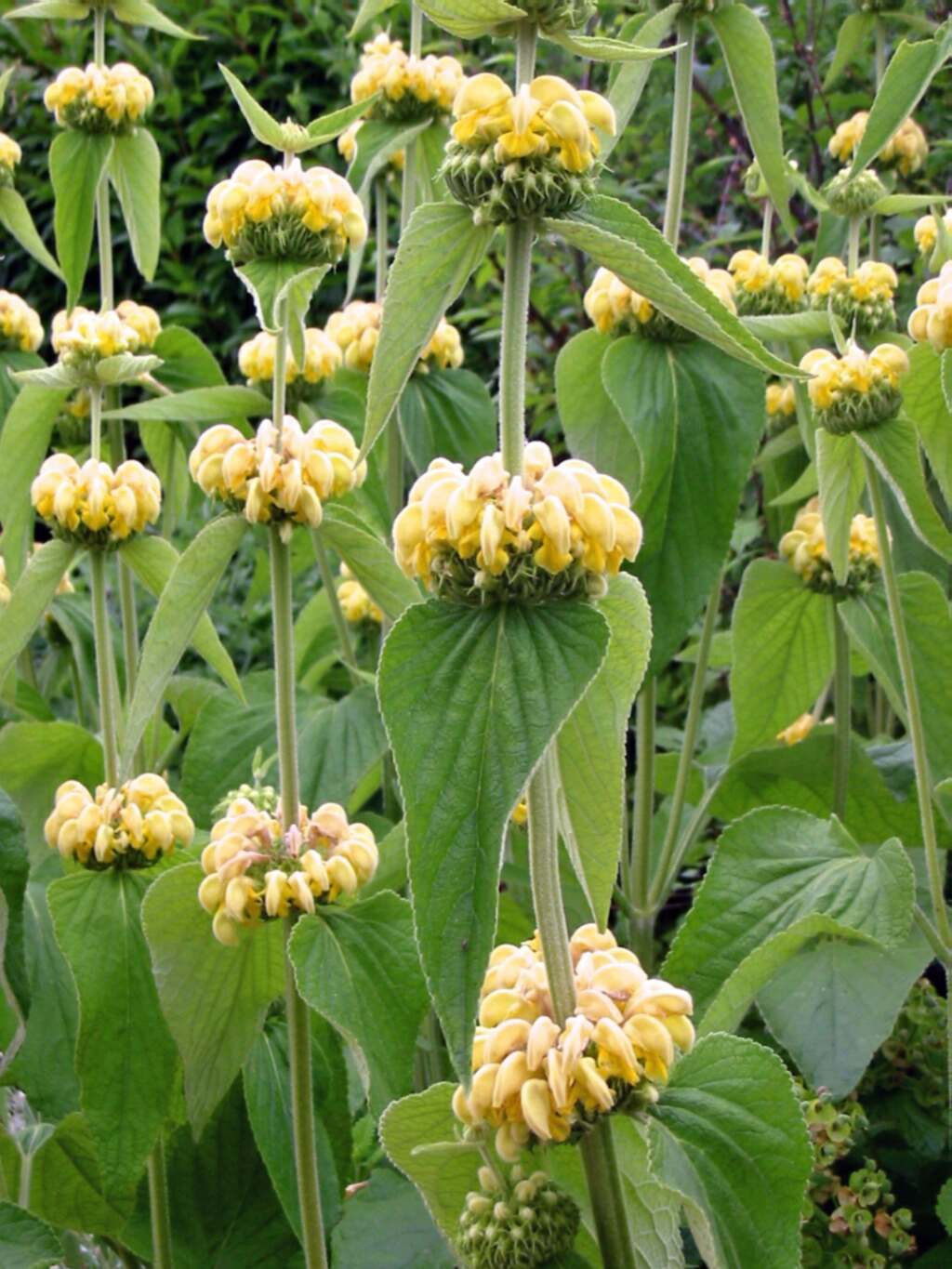

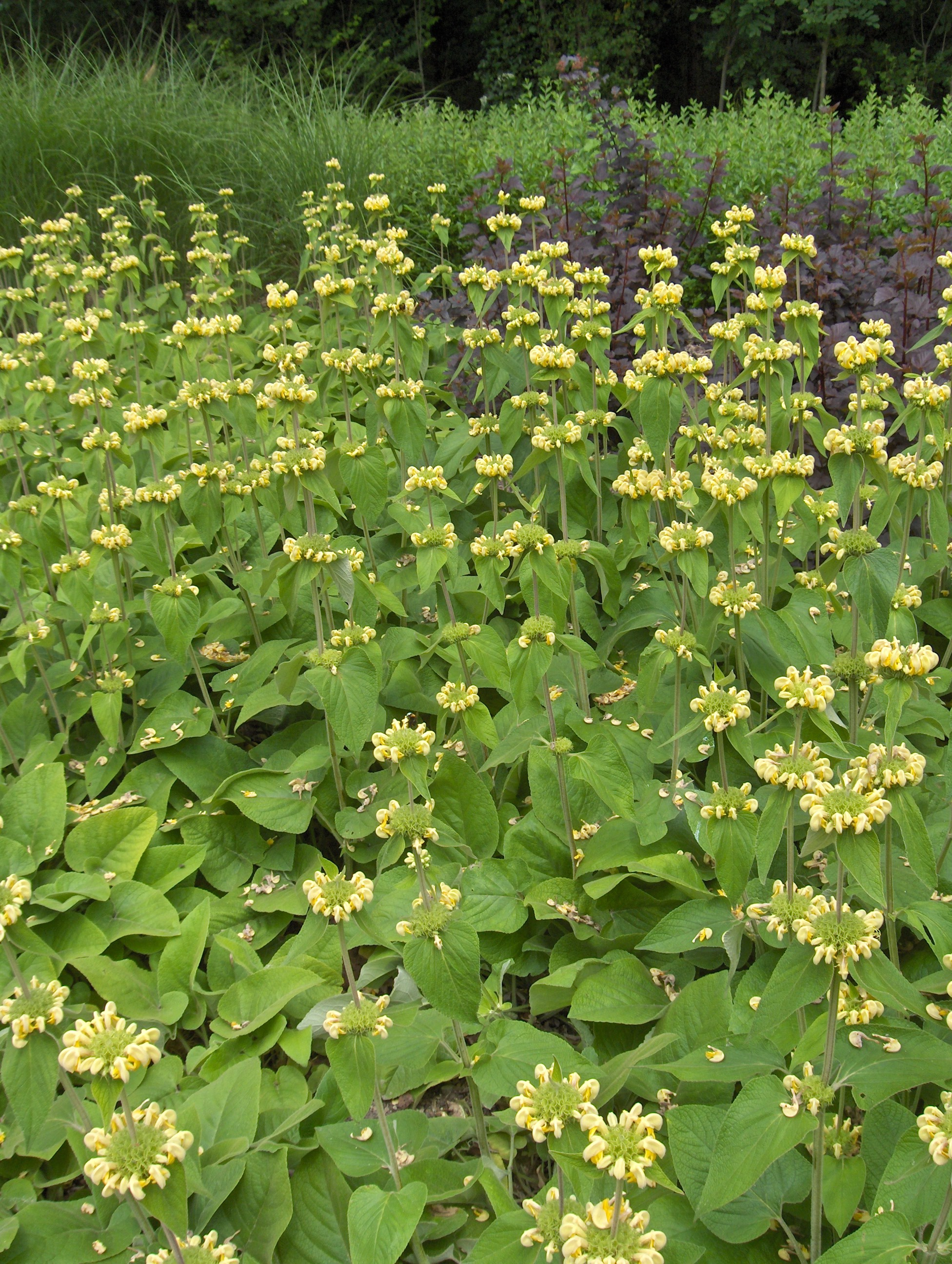

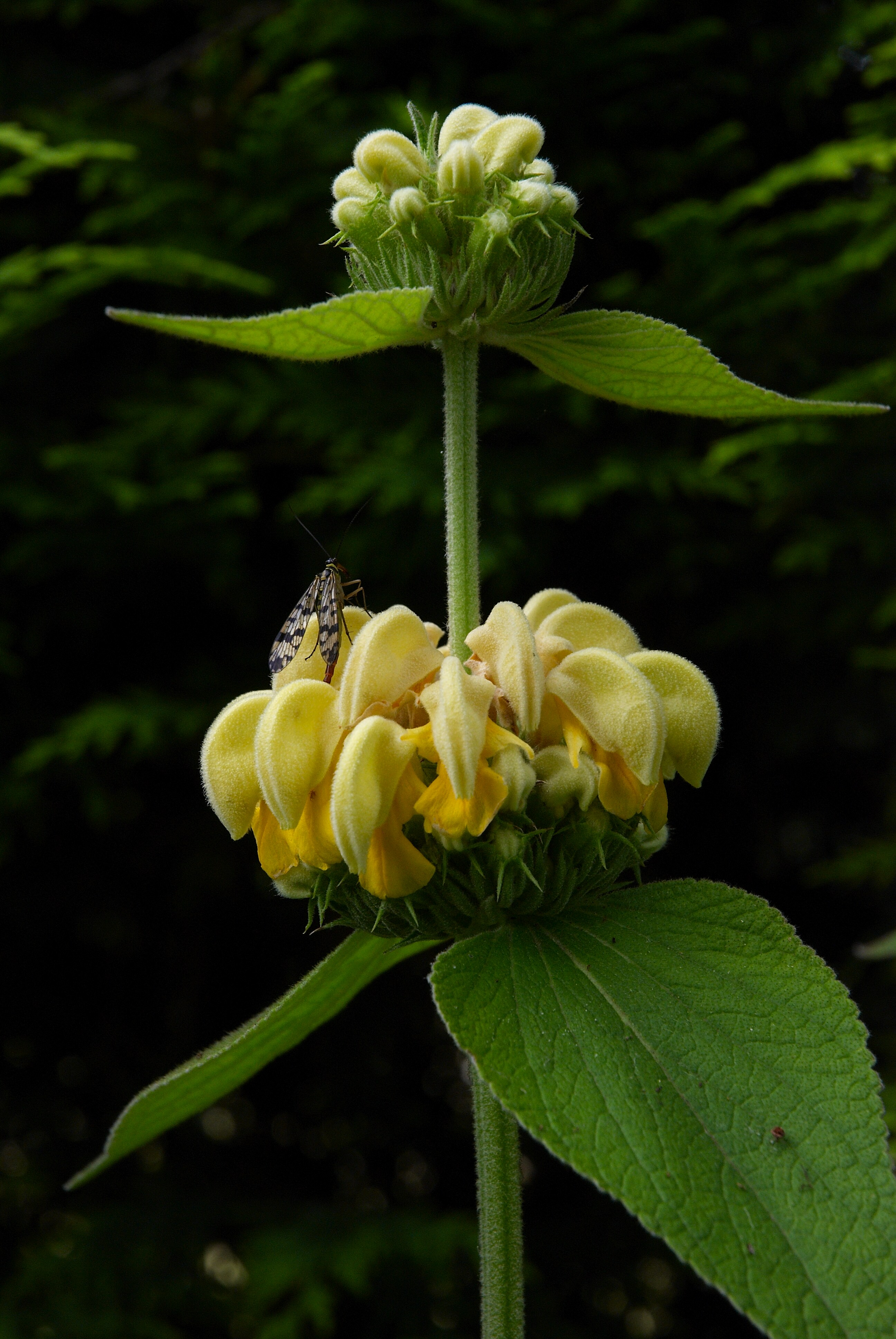

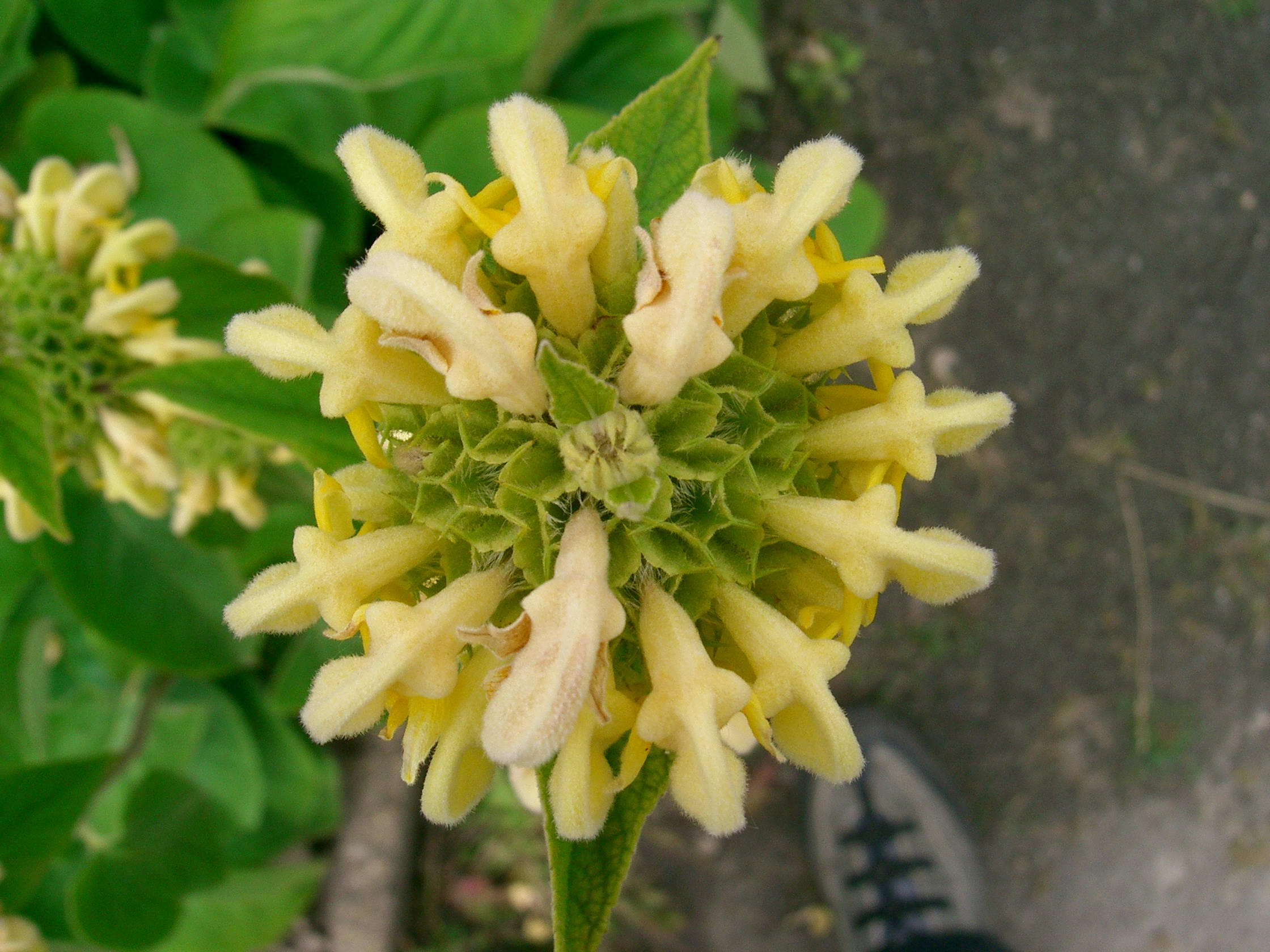

== See also ==
- Phlomis fruticosa – the similar-looking Jerusalem sage
