= John W. Sullivan =

John W. Sullivan was an Irish-Canadian mathematician, astronomer, and explorer who took part in the Palliser Expedition in the 19th century.

== Biography ==
Sullivan taught at the Royal Naval College in Greenwich, England. On the recommendation of fellow Naval College faculty member Edward Purcell, he became the astronomer and secretary on the Palliser Expedition that explored and surveyed what is now western Canada from 1857 to 1860.

As part of his explorations, Sullivan described the Nakoda people, and was the first to record the Sarcee language.

== Legacy ==
Mount Sullivan, a peak near Dease Lake (British Columbia), is named after Sullivan.
