= Pabstiella tricolor =

Scientific classification
- Kingdom: Plantae
- Clade: Tracheophytes
- Clade: Angiosperms
- Clade: Monocots
- Order: Asparagales
- Family: Orchidaceae
- Subfamily: Epidendroideae
- Genus: Pabstiella
- Species: P. tricolor

Binomial name
- Pabstiella tricolor (Barb.Rodr.) Luer

Synonyms
- Pleurothallis tricolor (Barb.Rodr.) Cogn.

Species of orchid

Pabstiella tricolor is a species of orchid plant.
