= Pabstiella stictophylla =

Scientific classification
- Kingdom: Plantae
- Clade: Tracheophytes
- Clade: Angiosperms
- Clade: Monocots
- Order: Asparagales
- Family: Orchidaceae
- Subfamily: Epidendroideae
- Genus: Pabstiella
- Species: P. stictophylla

Binomial name
- Pabstiella stictophylla (Schltr.) J.O.Caetano & L.R.S.Guim.

Synonyms
- Pleurothallis stictophylla Schltr.

Species of plant

Pabstiella stictophylla is a species of orchid plant native to Brazil.
