= Eugène Bourgeau =

French naturalist (1813–1877)

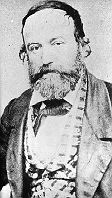
Eugene Bourgeau

Eugène Bourgeau (1813–1877) was a French naturalist. He was native of Brizon in the département of Haute-Savoie in France.

== Biographical information ==
As a young man, he worked at the botanical garden in Lyon, where his influences included Nicolas Charles Seringe and Claude Thomas Alexis Jordan. In 1843 he relocated to Paris, where he was hired by Philip Barker Webb as a herbarium assistant. In 1845-46 he collected plants for the "Webb collection" in the Canary Islands.

He had previously been a botanical collector in Spain, North Africa and the Canary Islands before joining the British North American Exploring Expedition of western Canada from 1857 to 1860. In Canada, he collected botanical specimens north of Lake Superior and areas around Lake Winnipeg, also journeying down the Saskatchewan River and venturing into the Rocky Mountains. Mt Bourgeau near Sunshine Village in Banff National Park bears his name.

Later expeditions included two trips to Asia Minor (the Lycia region and the Pontic Mountains), a journey to Spain and the Balearic Islands (1863), a scientific mission to Mexico (1865–66), and in 1870, a trip to the island of Rhodes.

Bourgeau did not publish any botanical literature. He distributed more than ten numbered and unnumbered series of duplicate specimens with labels often printed using an early type of duplicating machine. The specimen works are the results of his expeditions. They superficially resemble exsiccatae and are now located in major herbaria with titles like Plantes Canarienses 1845-1846, Env. de Toulon, Plantes d'Espagne 1851 and Plantae Armeniacae 1862. He reportedly was a terrible speller and grammarian.

== Patronyms ==
The name of Eugène Bourgeau is commemorated with Mount Bourgeau, a peak located in Banff National Park.

In honor of him, several taxonomic patronyms were also given in plants:

- the genus Bourgaea was named by Ernest Cosson.
- the species names Anthemis bourgaei, Bupleurum bourgaei, Muscari bourgaei, Onosma bourgaei, Phlomis bourgaei, Quercus bourgaei, and Tillandsia bourgaei.
