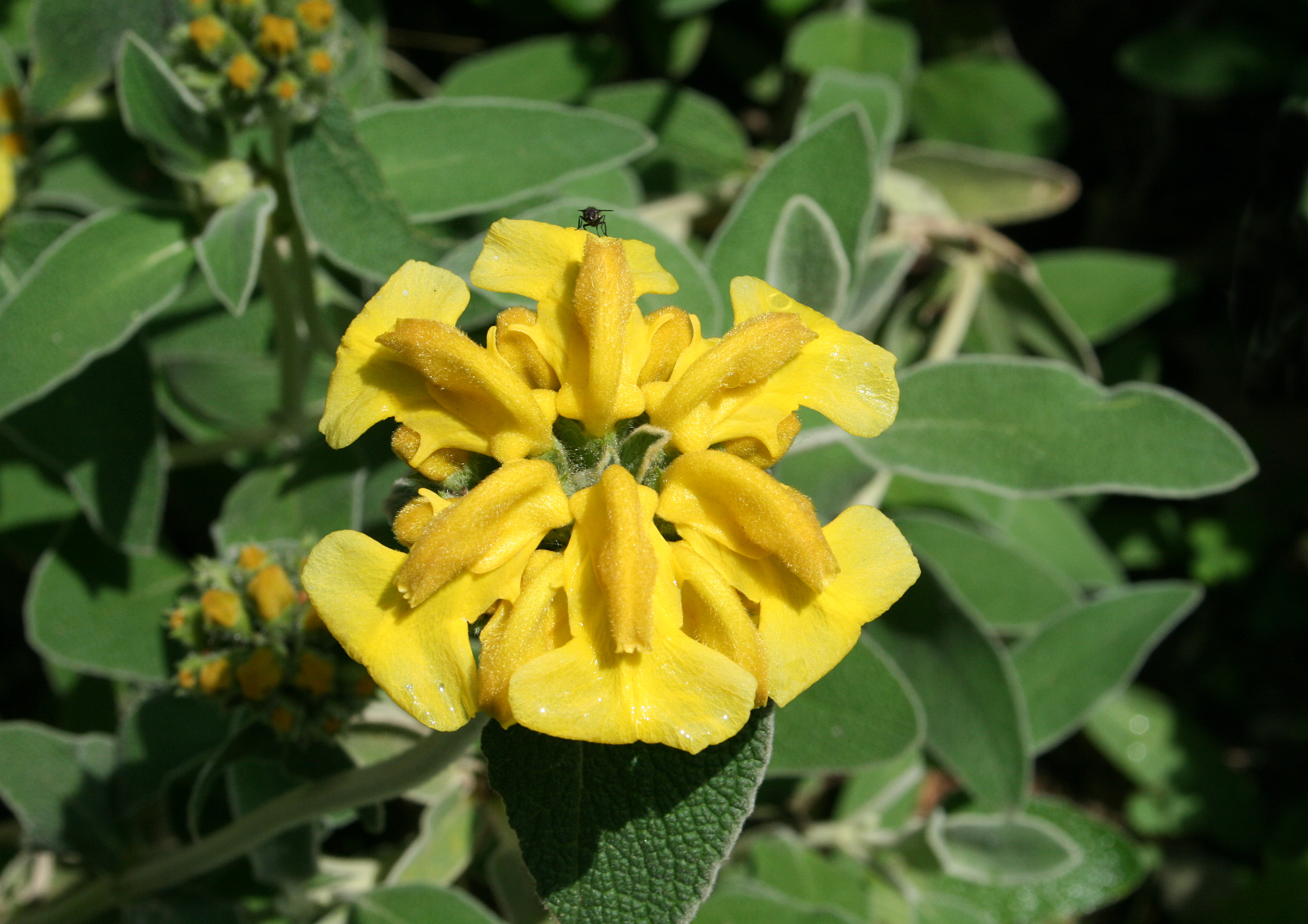

Scientific classification
- Kingdom: Plantae
- Clade: Embryophytes
- Clade: Tracheophytes
- Clade: Angiosperms
- Clade: Eudicots
- Clade: Asterids
- Order: Lamiales
- Family: Lamiaceae
- Genus: Phlomis
- Species: P. fruticosa

Binomial name
- Phlomis fruticosa L.

= Phlomis fruticosa =

Species of flowering plant in the sage family

Phlomis fruticosa, the Jerusalem sage, is a species of flowering plant in the family Lamiaceae, native to Albania, Croatia, Cyprus, Greece, Italy, Montenegro and Turkey.

It is a small evergreen shrub, up to 1 m (3 ft) tall by 1.5 m (5 ft) wide. The sage-like, aromatic leaves are oval, 5–10 cm (2-4ins) long, wrinkled, grey-green with white undersides, and covered with fine hairs. Deep yellow, tubular flowers, 3 cm in length, grow in whorls of 20 in short spikes in summer.

The specific epithet fruticosa means "shrubby".

It is popular as an ornamental plant, and has gained the Royal Horticultural Society's Award of Garden Merit.

As a garden escape, it has naturalised in parts of South West England.

It is listed as deer resistant, hardy in zones 7 to 11, and tolerant of a range of soil types.

== Gallery ==
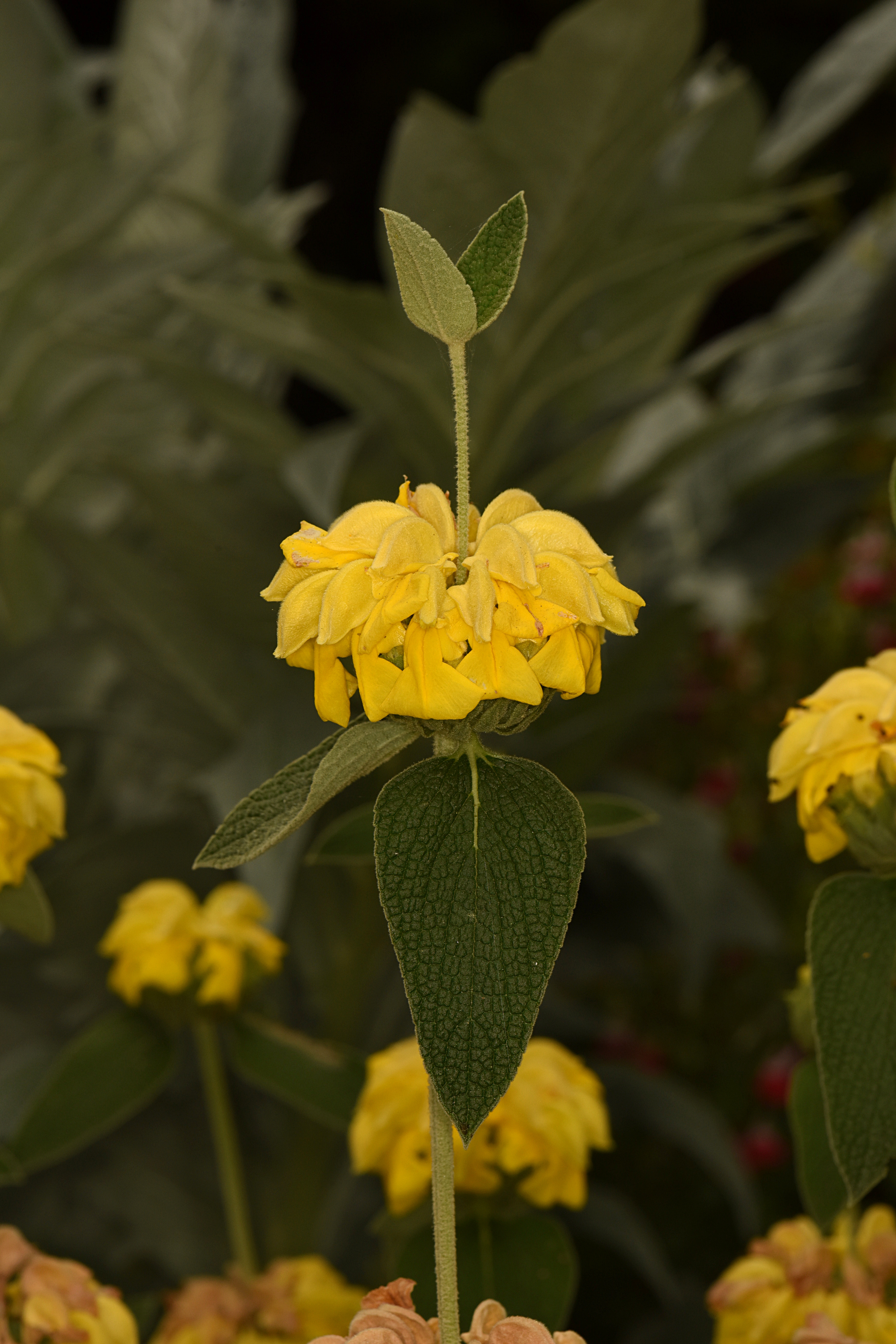

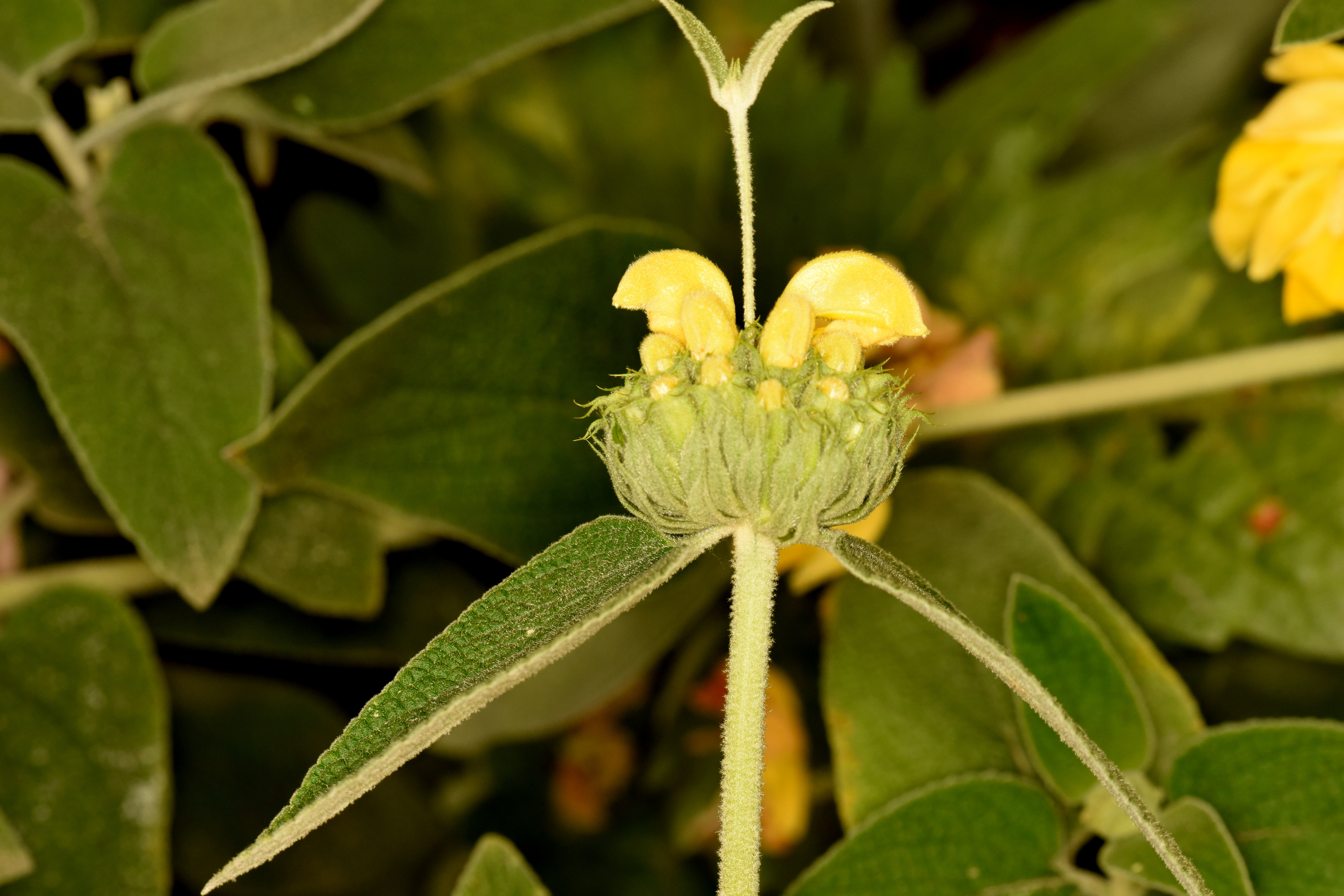

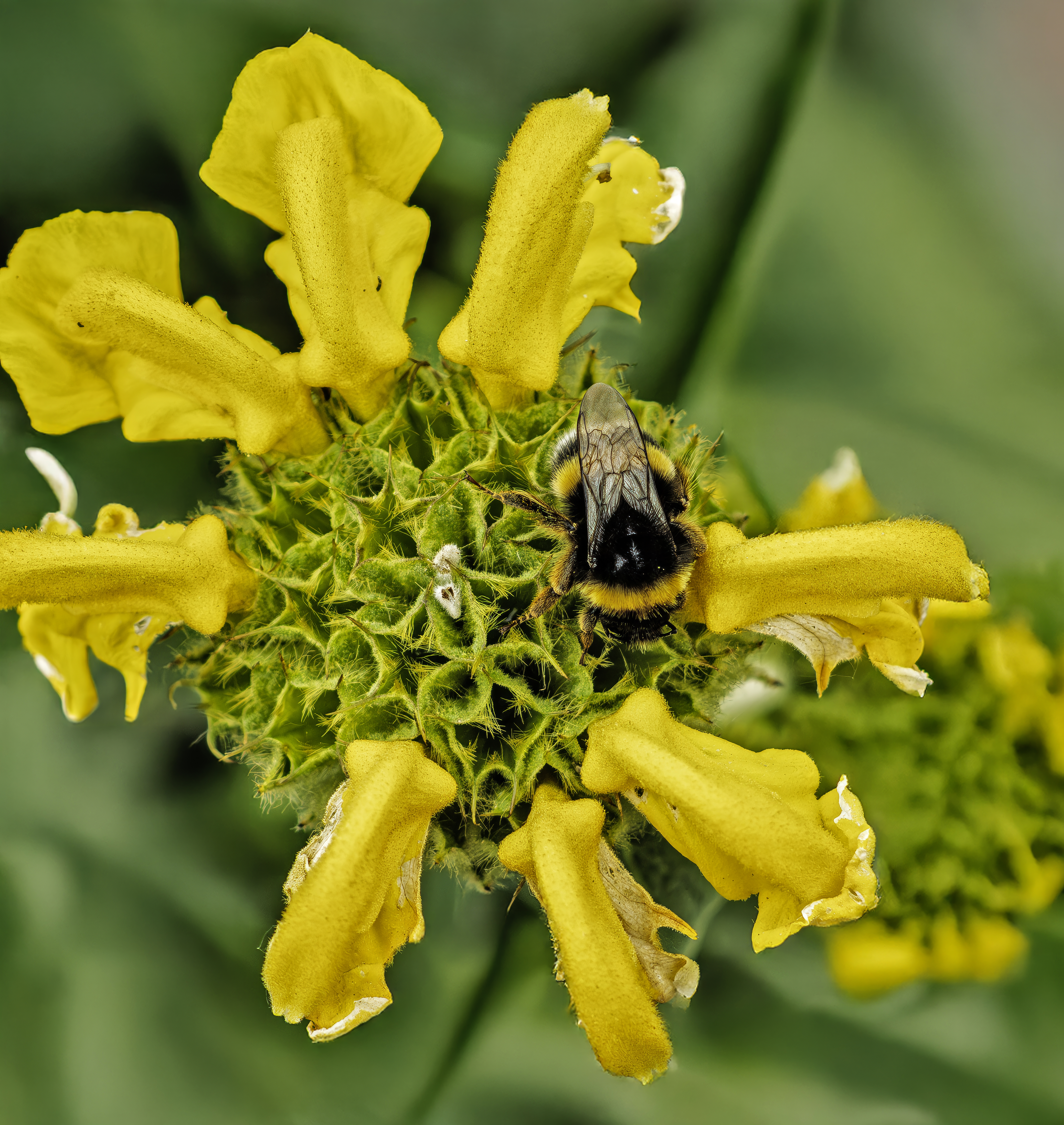
Pollination by Bombus terrestris

== See also ==
- Phlomis russeliana – the similar-looking Turkish sage also sometimes called Jerusalem sage
