= Pabstiella deltoglossa =

Scientific classification
- Kingdom: Plantae
- Clade: Tracheophytes
- Clade: Angiosperms
- Clade: Monocots
- Order: Asparagales
- Family: Orchidaceae
- Subfamily: Epidendroideae
- Genus: Pabstiella
- Species: P. deltoglossa

Binomial name
- Pabstiella deltoglossa (Cogn.) Toscano & Luer

Synonyms
- Pleurothallis deltoglossa Cogn.

Species of orchid

Pabstiella deltoglossa is a species of orchid plant native to Brazil .
