= Pabstiella syringodes =

Scientific classification
- Kingdom: Plantae
- Clade: Tracheophytes
- Clade: Angiosperms
- Clade: Monocots
- Order: Asparagales
- Family: Orchidaceae
- Subfamily: Epidendroideae
- Genus: Pabstiella
- Species: P. syringodes

Binomial name
- Pabstiella syringodes (Luer) F.Barros

Synonyms
- Pleurothallis syringodes Luer

Species of plant

Pabstiella syringodes is a species of orchid plant native to Colombia.
