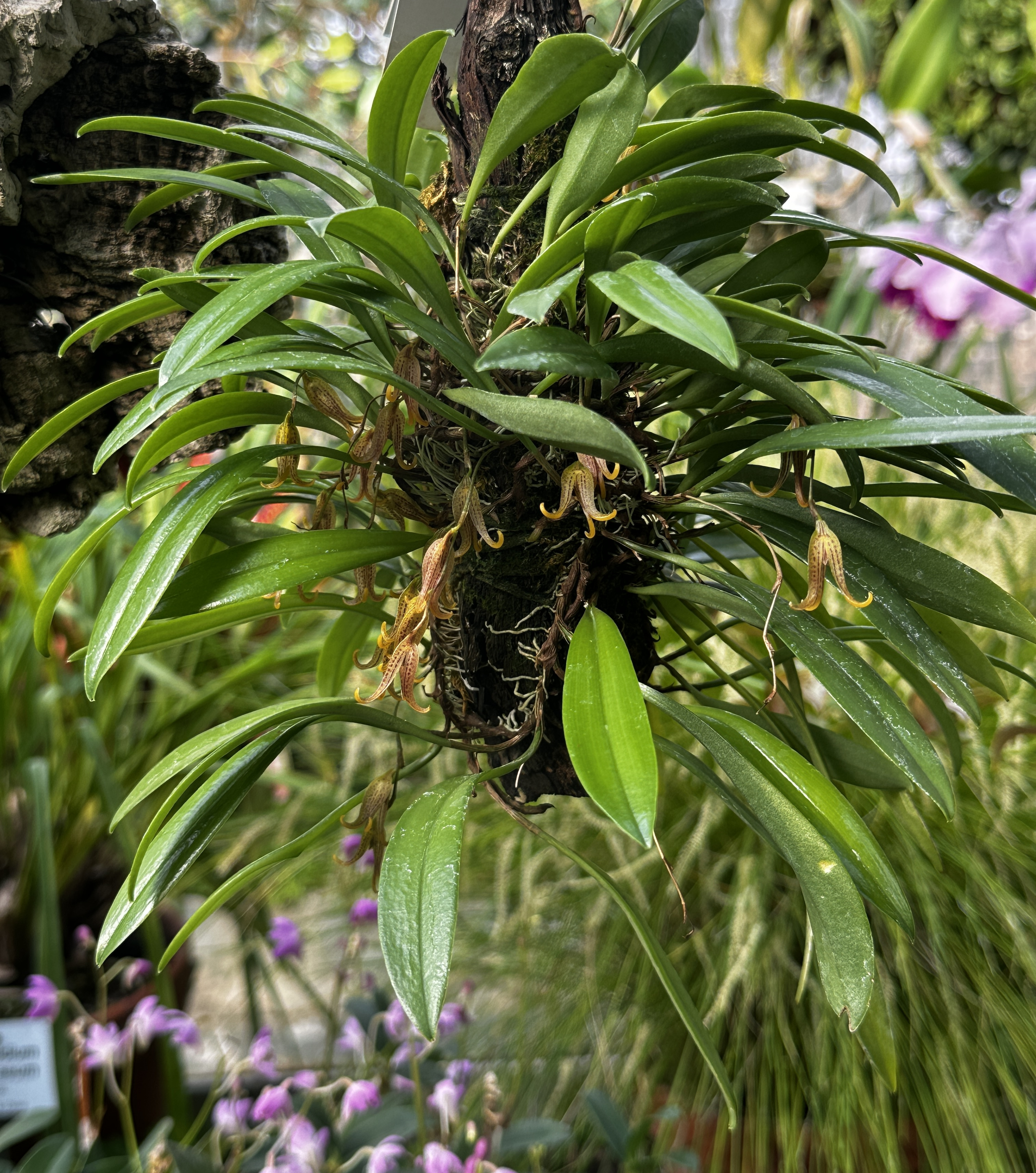

Scientific classification
- Kingdom: Plantae
- Clade: Tracheophytes
- Clade: Angiosperms
- Clade: Monocots
- Order: Asparagales
- Family: Orchidaceae
- Subfamily: Epidendroideae
- Genus: Pabstiella
- Species: P. tripterantha

Binomial name
- Pabstiella tripterantha (Rchb.f.) F.Barros

Synonyms
- Pleurothallis tripteranthera Rchb.f.

= Pabstiella tripterantha =

Species of plant

Pabstiella tripterantha is a species of orchid plant native to Bolivia.
