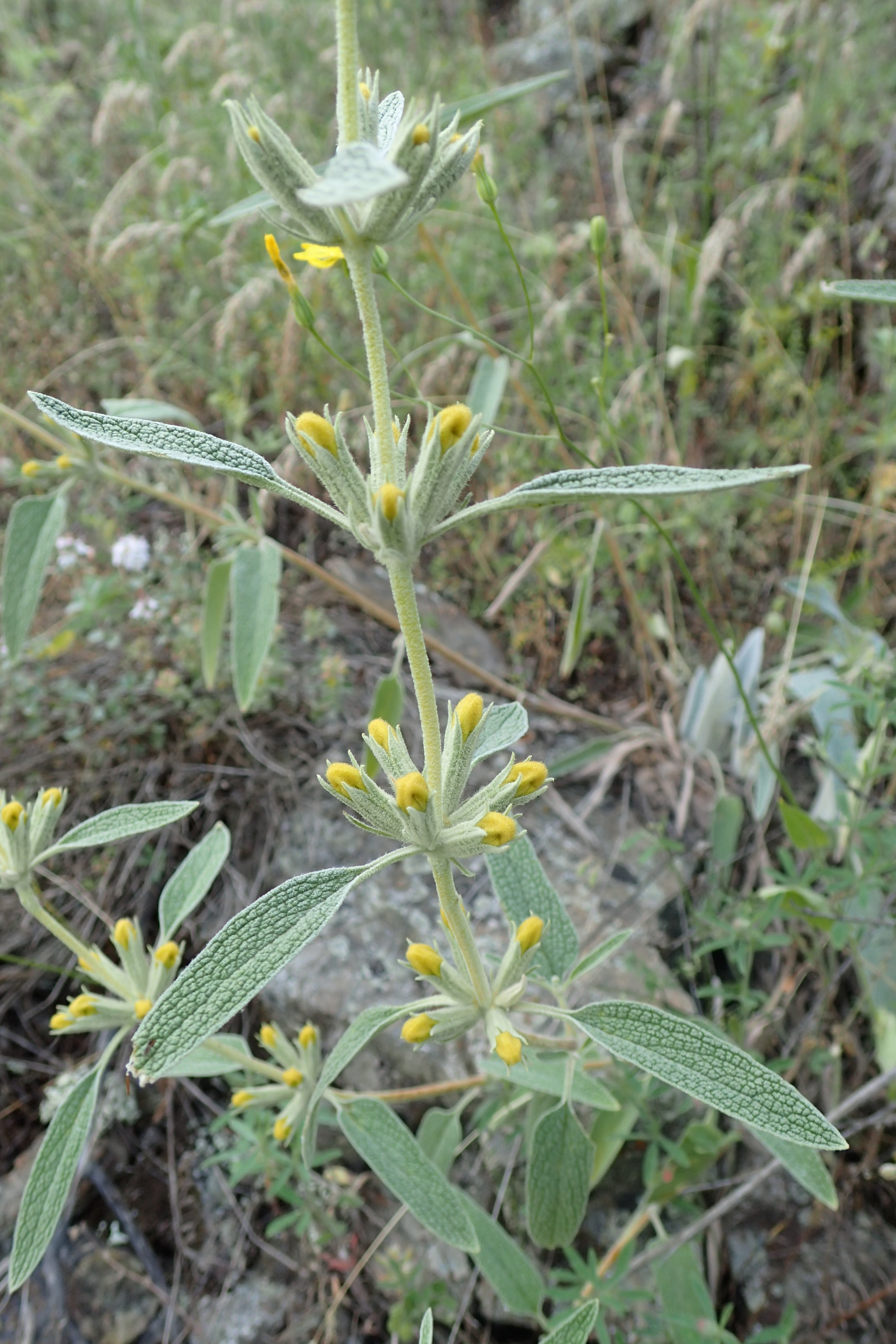

Scientific classification
- Kingdom: Plantae
- Clade: Tracheophytes
- Clade: Angiosperms
- Clade: Eudicots
- Clade: Asterids
- Order: Lamiales
- Family: Lamiaceae
- Genus: Phlomis
- Species: P. armeniaca

Binomial name
- Phlomis armeniaca Willd.

Synonyms
- P. nympharum O. Schwarz; P. linearis Boissier & Balansa subsp. anticragi P.H. Davis

= Phlomis armeniaca =

Species of flowering plant

Phlomis armeniaca is a perennial herb in the genus Phlomis endemic to Turkey and the Transcaucasus.
