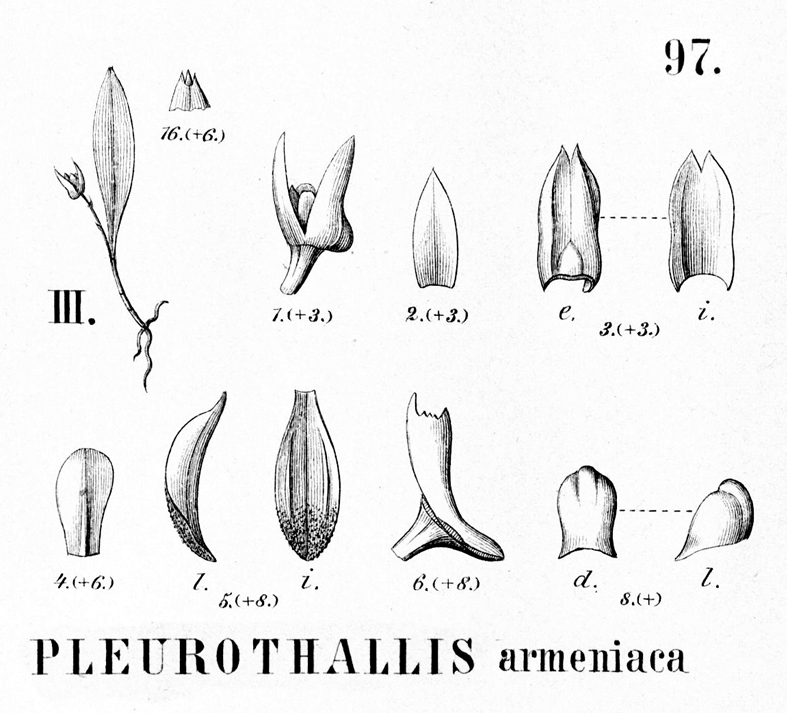

Scientific classification
- Kingdom: Plantae
- Clade: Tracheophytes
- Clade: Angiosperms
- Clade: Monocots
- Order: Asparagales
- Family: Orchidaceae
- Subfamily: Epidendroideae
- Genus: Pabstiella
- Species: P. armeniaca

Binomial name
- Pabstiella armeniaca (Barb.Rodr.) L.Kollmann

Synonyms
- Pleurothallis armeniaca (Barb.Rodr.) Cogn.

= Pabstiella armeniaca =

Species of orchid

Pabstiella armeniaca is a species of orchid plant.
