= Pabstiella aryter =

Scientific classification
- Kingdom: Plantae
- Clade: Tracheophytes
- Clade: Angiosperms
- Clade: Monocots
- Order: Asparagales
- Family: Orchidaceae
- Subfamily: Epidendroideae
- Genus: Pabstiella
- Species: P. aryter

Binomial name
- Pabstiella aryter (Luer) F.Barros

Synonyms
- Pleurothallis aryter Luer

Species of orchid

Pabstiella aryter is a species of orchid plant native to Peru.
