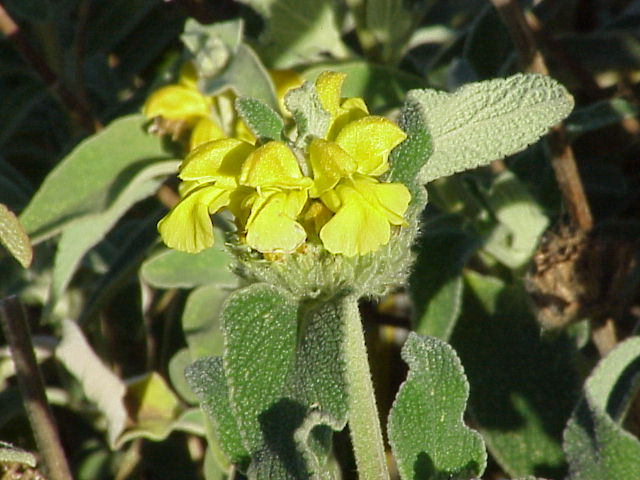
- Phlomis fruticosa

Scientific classification
- Kingdom: Plantae
- Clade: Tracheophytes
- Clade: Angiosperms
- Clade: Eudicots
- Clade: Asterids
- Order: Lamiales
- Family: Lamiaceae
- Subfamily: Lamioideae
- Genus: Phlomis; L. (1753)

Species
- 100+, see text

Synonyms
- Anemitis Raf. (1837); Beloakon Raf. (1837); Blephiloma Raf. (1837); Hersilia Raf. (1837)

= Phlomis =

Genus of flowering plants in the sage family

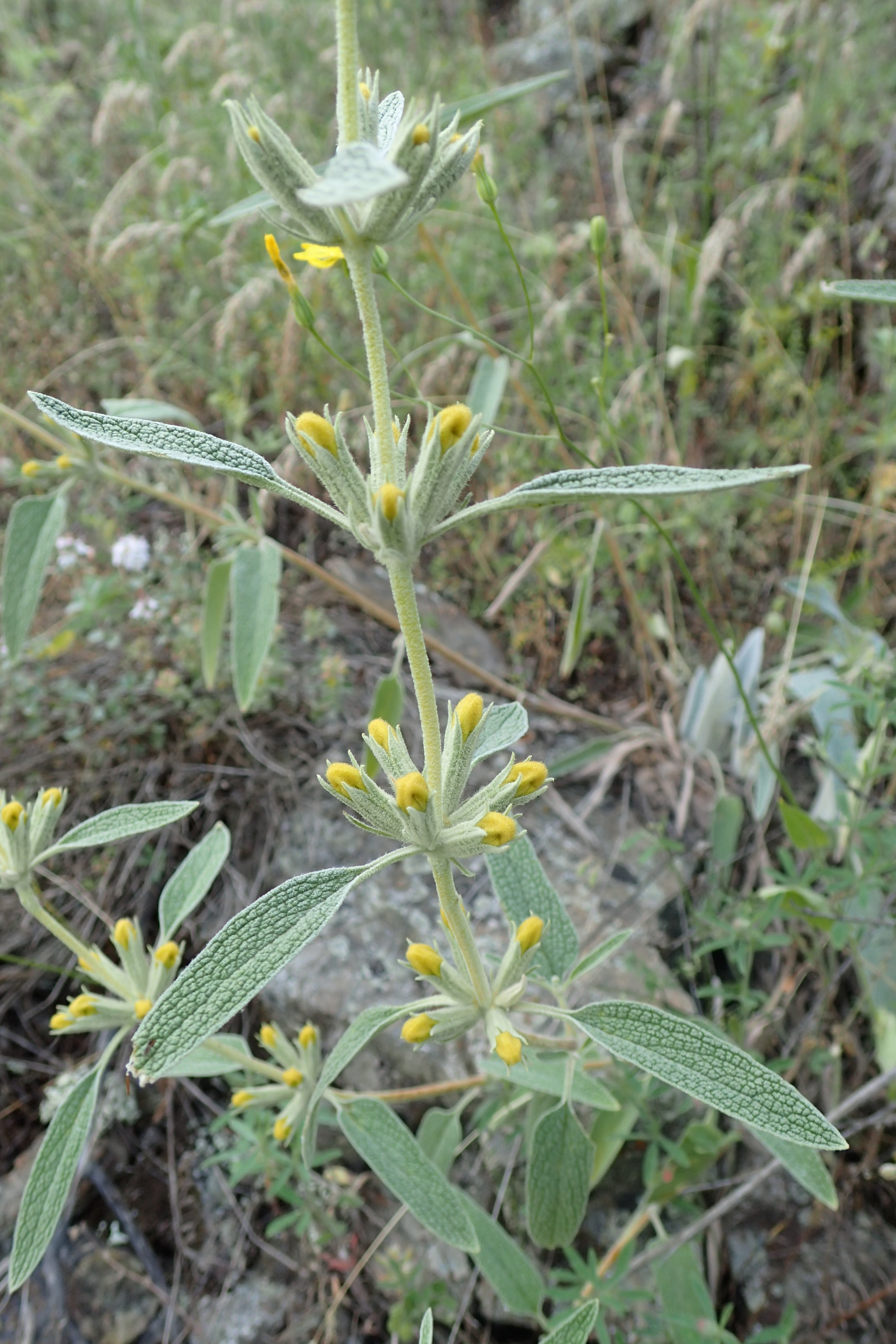
Phlomis armeniaca

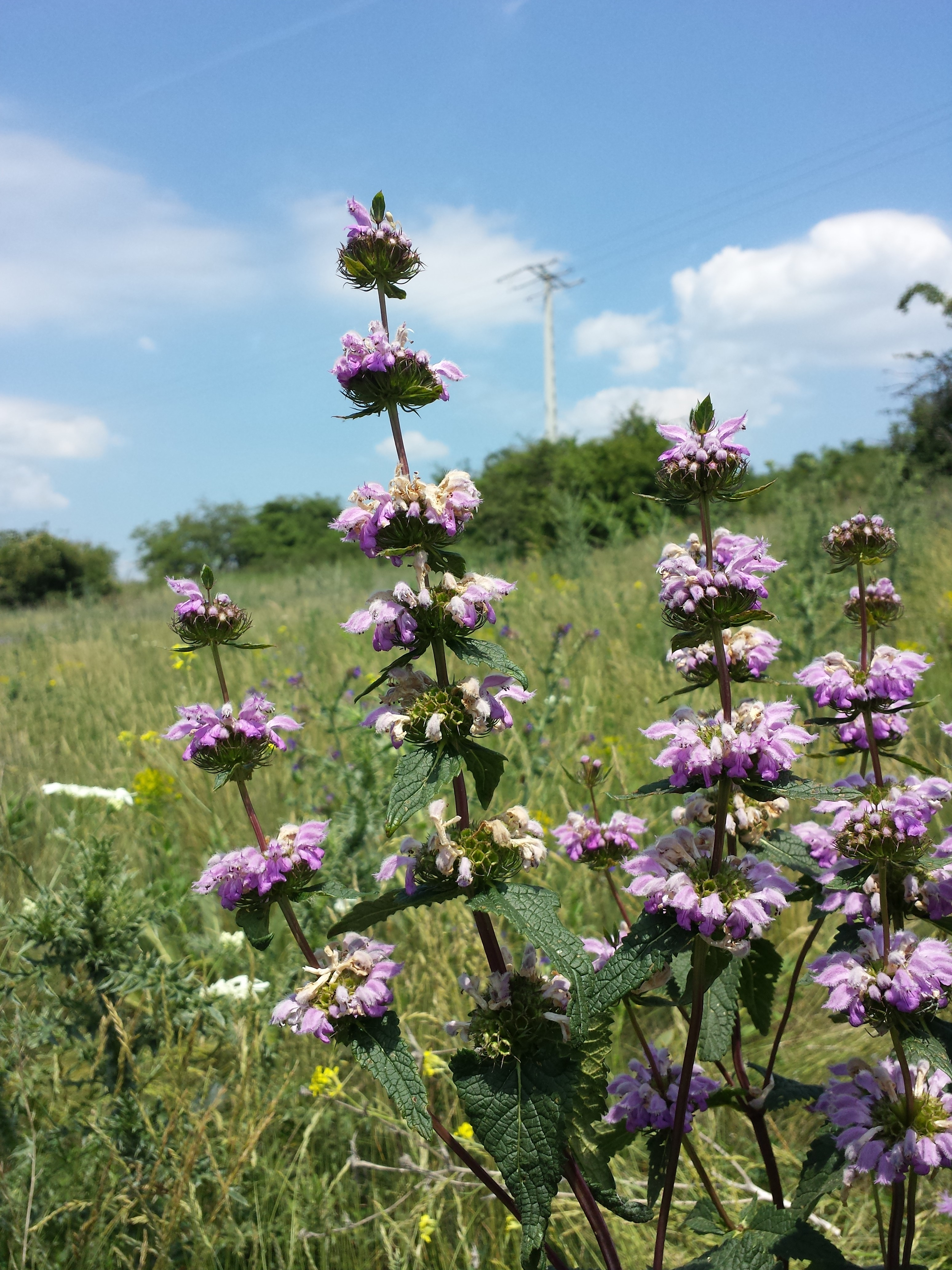
Phlomis tuberosa

Phlomis is a genus of over 100 species of herbaceous plants, subshrubs and shrubs in the mint family Lamiaceae, native from the Mediterranean region east across central Asia to China.

The name Phlomis derives from a Greek word for "flame", and may refer to the leaves' use in ancient times as lamp wicks. Common names include Jerusalem sage and lampwick plant.

== Description ==
The overall size varies between species from 30 cm tall up to 2 m tall (12–79 in). The leaves are entire, opposite and decussate (each leaf pair at right angles to the next) and rugose or reticulate veined. The bracts (floral leaves) are similar or different from the lower leaves. All parts are frequently covered with hairs. The bracteoles are ovate, lanceolate or linear. The flowers are arranged in whorls called verticillasters which encircle the stems. The stems are usually square in section with rounded corners, although tomentum on the stems can make them appear circular. The colour of the flowers varies from yellow to pink, purple and white. The calyx is tubular or campanulate with five or ten veins visible. Five teeth, either all equal or with the outer two longer than the others. The upper lip is hood shaped and laterally compressed (P. tuberosa, however, has an uncompressed lip with a dense bearded edge). The lower lip is trifid, the central lobe being larger than the lateral ones. There are four stamens ascending under the upper lip. Anther with forked end, the upper fork being shorter than the lower. The fruits are four three-sided nutlets, and sometimes topped with hair, sometimes glabrous. The root system can be very extensive; roots of 6-week-old seedlings have been measured at 0.7 m.

Phlomis species are the only host plants of the moths Coleophora phlomidella and C. phlomidis.

Phlomic acid is named after the genus.

== Systematics ==
The following species belong to genus Phlomis, but some of them are now distributed in the genus Phlomoides.

=== Phlomis ===
- Phlomis × alanyensis Hub.-Mor.
- Phlomis amanica Vierh.
- Phlomis angustissima Hub.-Mor.
- Phlomis anisodonta Boiss.
- Phlomis antiatlantica J.P.Peltier
- Phlomis armeniaca Willd.
- Phlomis aucheri Boiss.
- Phlomis aurea Decne.
- Phlomis × bornmuelleri Rech.f.
- Phlomis bourgaei Boiss.
- Phlomis bovei de Noé
- Phlomis brachyodon (Boiss.) Zohary ex Rech.f.
- Phlomis brevibracteata Turrill
- Phlomis brevidentata H.W.Li
- Phlomis brevilabris Ehrenb. ex Boiss.
- Phlomis bruguieri Desf.
- Phlomis brunneogaleata Hub.-Mor.
- Phlomis bucharica Regel
- Phlomis cancellata Bunge
- Phlomis capitata Boiss.
- Phlomis carica Rech.f.
- Phlomis cashmeriana Royle ex Benth.
- Phlomis cashmirica Wells
- Phlomis chimerae Boissieu
- Phlomis chorassanica Bunge
- Phlomis chrysophylla Boiss.
- Phlomis × cilicica Hub.-Mor.
- Phlomis × commixta Rech.f.
- Phlomis × composita Pau
- Phlomis cretica C.Presl
- Phlomis crinita Cav.
- Phlomis cyclodon Knorring
- Phlomis cypria Post
- Phlomis × cytherea Rech.f.
- Phlomis dincii Yıld.
- Phlomis drobovii Popov
- Phlomis × ekimii Dadand & H.Duman
- Phlomis elliptica Benth.
- Phlomis elongata Hand.-Mazz.
- Phlomis floccosa D.Don
- Phlomis fruticetorum Gontsch.
- Phlomis fruticosa L. – Jerusalem sage
- Phlomis ghilanensis K.Koch
- Phlomis grandiflora H.S.Thomps.
- Phlomis herba-venti L.
- Phlomis hypoleuca Vved.
- Phlomis integrifolia Hub.-Mor.
- Phlomis iranica Joharchi & Vaezi
- Phlomis isiliae Yıld.
- Phlomis italica L.
- Phlomis × kalanensis Hub.-Mor.
- Phlomis kotschyana Hub.-Mor.
- Phlomis kurdica Rech.f.
- Phlomis lanata Willd.
- Phlomis lanceolata Boiss. & Hohen.
- Phlomis leucophracta P.H.Davis & Hub.-Mor.
- Phlomis linearifolia Zakirov
- Phlomis linearis Boiss. & Balansa
- Phlomis longifolia Boiss. & C.I.Blanche
- Phlomis lunariifolia Sm.
- Phlomis lurestanica Jamzad
- Phlomis lychnitis L. - lampwick plant
- Phlomis lycia D.Don
- Phlomis majkopensis (Novopokr.) Grossh.
- Phlomis × margaritae Aparicio & Silvestre
- Phlomis mazandaranica Jamzad
- Phlomis × melitenensis Hub.-Mor.
- Phlomis mindshelkensis Lazkov
- Phlomis × mobullensis Hub.-Mor.
- Phlomis monocephala P.H.Davis
- Phlomis × muglensis Hub.-Mor.
- Phlomis nana C.Y.Wu
- Phlomis nissolii L.
- Phlomis nubilans Zakirov
- Phlomis nyalamensis H.W.Li
- Phlomis olgae Regel
- Phlomis olivieri Benth.
- Phlomis oppositiflora Boiss. & Hausskn.
- Phlomis orientalis Mill.
- Phlomis × pabotii Rech.f.
- Phlomis pachyphylla Rech.f.
- Phlomis persica Boiss.
- Phlomis physocalyx Hub.-Mor.
- Phlomis pichleri Vierh.
- Phlomis platystegia Post
- Phlomis polioxantha Rech.f.
- Phlomis × praetervisa Rech.f.
- Phlomis purpurea L.
- Phlomis × rechingeri Hub.-Mor.
- Phlomis regelii Popov
- Phlomis rigida Labill.
- Phlomis russeliana (Sims) Lag. ex Benth.
- Phlomis salicifolia Regel
- Phlomis samia L.
- Phlomis × semiorbata Rech.f.
- Phlomis sewerzowii Regel
- Phlomis × sieberi Vierh.
- Phlomis sieheana Rech.f.
- Phlomis sintenisii Rech.f.
- Phlomis spinidens Nevski
- Phlomis × stapfiana Rech.f.
- Phlomis stewartii Hook.f.
- Phlomis syriaca Boiss.
- Phlomis tathamiorum R.M.Haber & Semaan – from Lebanon
- Phlomis tenorei Soldano
- Phlomis tenuis Knorring
- Phlomis × termessi P.H.Davis
- Phlomis thapsoides Bunge
- Phlomis tomentosa Regel
- Phlomis trineura Rech.f.
- Phlomis × tunceliensis Hub.-Mor.
- Phlomis × vierhapperi Rech.f.
- Phlomis viscosa Poir.
- Phlomis × vuralii Dadandi
- Phlomis × wendelboi Jamzad
- Phlomis zenaidae Knorring

=== Phlomoides ===
- Phlomis alpina now called Phlomoides alpina
- Phlomis betonicoides now called Phlomoides betonicoides
- Phlomis bracteosa now called Phlomoides bracteosa
- Phlomis macrophylla now called Phlomoides macrophylla
- Phlomis maximowiczii now called Phlomoides maximowiczii
- Phlomis melanantha now called Phlomoides melanantha
- Phlomis milingensis now called Phlomoides milingensis
- Phlomis oreophila now called Phlomoides oreophila
- Phlomis pratensis now called Phlomoides pratensis
- Phlomis rotata now called Phlomoides rotata
- Phlomis spectabilis now called Phlomoides spectabilis
- Phlomis tuberosa now called Phlomoides tuberosa
- Phlomis umbrosa now called Phlomoides umbrosa
- Phlomis younghusbandii now called Phlomoides younghusbandii
