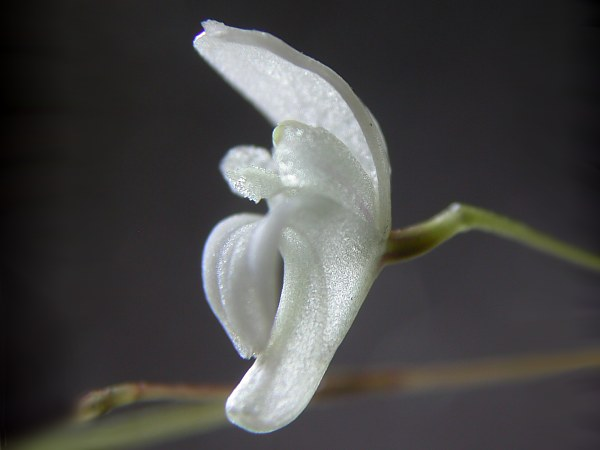
- Pabstiella mirabilis (type species)

Scientific classification
- Kingdom: Plantae
- Clade: Tracheophytes
- Clade: Angiosperms
- Clade: Monocots
- Order: Asparagales
- Family: Orchidaceae
- Subfamily: Epidendroideae
- Tribe: Epidendreae
- Subtribe: Pleurothallidinae
- Genus: Pabstiella; Brieger & Senghas (1976)

Species
- See list of Pabstiella species

= Pabstiella =

Genus of orchids

Pabstiella is a small orchid genus belonging to the subfamily Epidendroideae. They occur in Central and Tropical America.

While the "Checklist of Monocotyledons" of Kew Botanical Gardens (2005) considers Pabstiella as an accepted name, it is considered a synonym of Pleurothallis by the Vascular plant families and genera (R.K. Brummitt, 1992). The synonym Anthereon Pridgeon & M. W. Chase is a nom. illeg. because it includes the type of the earlier accepted name Pabstiella

== Species ==
- Pabstiella aryter (Luer) F.Barros (synonym Pleurothallis aryter)
- Pabstiella determannii (Luer) F.Barros (synonym Pleurothallis determannii)
- Pabstiella mirabilis (Schltr.) Brieger & Senghas (type genus) (synonym Pleurothallis mirabilis)
- Pabstiella syringodes (Luer) F.Barros (synonym Pleurothallis syringodes)
- Pabstiella tripterantha (Rchb.f.) F.Barros (synonym Pleurothallis tripterantha)
- Pabstiella yauaperyensis (Barb. Rodr.) F. Barros (synonym Lepanthes yauaperyensis)
