= Takanashi Family Gardens =

Garden in Noda, Chiba Prefecture, Japan

Takanashi-shi teien
- 髙梨氏庭園
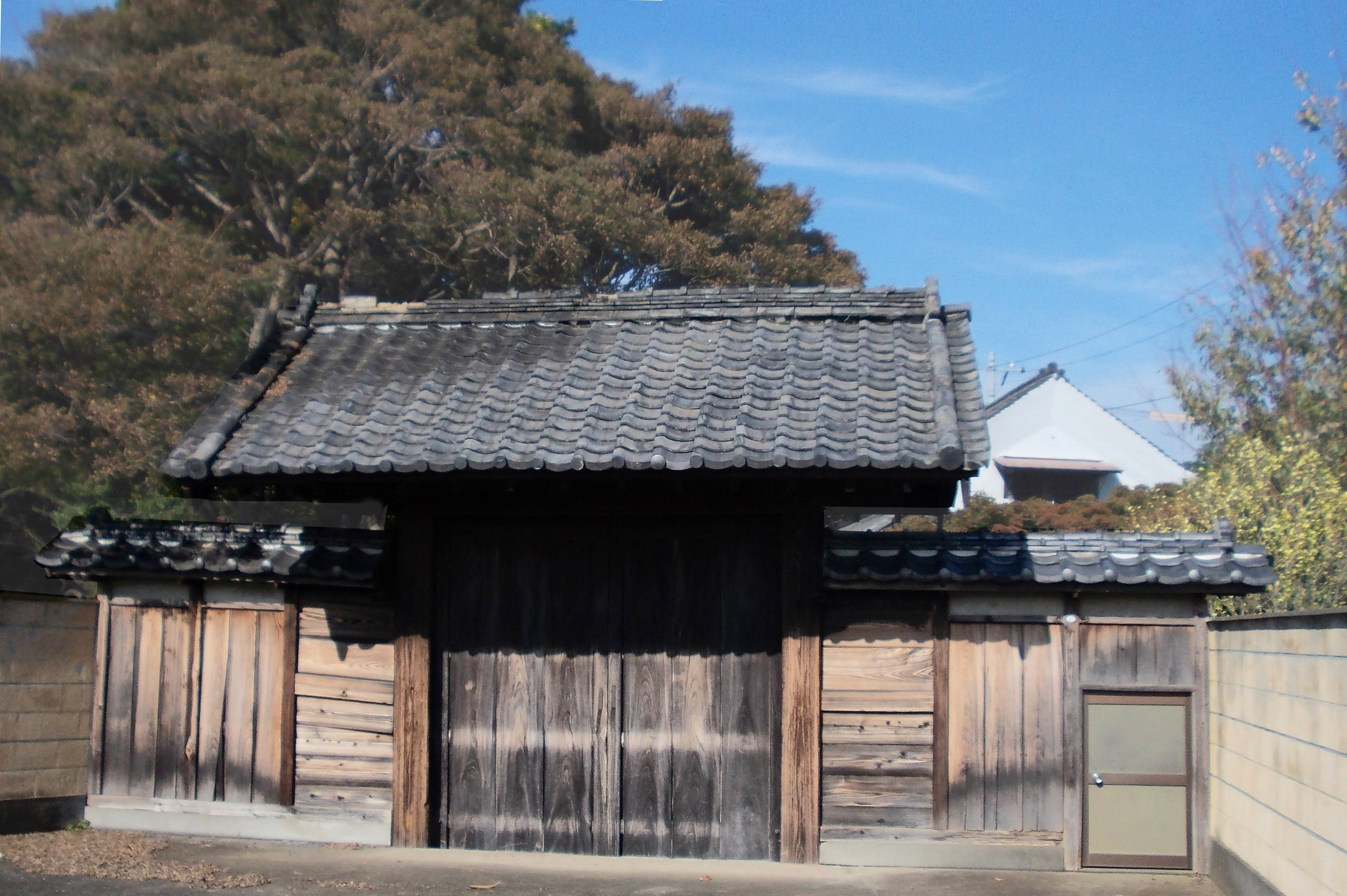

- Location within Chiba Prefecture Location within Japan
- Type: Urban park
- Location: Noda, Chiba, Japan
- Coordinates: 35°56′18″N 139°51′24″E
- Created: 1806
- Operator: Noda City
- Status: Open March to mid-December
- National Palace of Scenic Beauty

Takanashi family garden (髙梨氏庭園, Takanashi-shi teien) is a Japanese landscape garden and nationally designated Place of Scenic Beauty located in the city of Noda, Chiba Prefecture, Japan.

== Overview ==
The Takanashi family were wealthy farmers who begun to brew soy sauce in Noda from 1661, and served as village headmen of Kamihanawa Village throughout the Edo period. Noda developed into a major center for soy sauce production in the Edo period, and soy sauce remains an important local industry to this day. The Takanashi were among the most successful brewers, and in 1829 were appointed the official supplier of soy sauce to the court of the Shogun. The Takanashi residence overlooks the Edo River to the west,. The gatehouse was built in 1766 and faces east. The central part of the mansion is the sukiya-style Shoin built in 1806, and the garden was constructed at that time. The garden is composed of a moat and forest, with many buildings connected by corridors centered around the main house. Trees were selected to provide enjoyment of the four seasons. In the 20th century, the main house, tea room, and garden were renovated, and modernized; however, it remains a valuable cultural property that conveys to the present day the mansion structure of upper-level farmers and soy sauce brewers since the early Edo period. The garden is open to the public as the Kamiwara History Museum.

In 2009, the zelkova trees lining the road that leads to the Edo River were added to the National Scenic Place designation.

== See also ==
- List of Places of Scenic Beauty of Japan (Chiba)
