= Atago Station =

Atago Station the name of two train stations in Japan:

- Atago Station (Miyagi) (愛宕駅), Miyagi Prefecture
- Atago Station (Chiba) (愛宕駅), Chiba Prefecture
