= Kawama =

Kawama may refer to:

- Kawama Airport in Matanzas Province, Cuba
- also a channel, district and hotel in Varadero, Cuba
- Kawama Station in Noda, Chiba, Japan
- Kazusa-Kawama Station in Ichihara, Chiba, Japan
- Otoro language, also known as Kawama

== See also ==
- Loggerhead sea turtle, also known as ¨caguama¨
