= Shimizu Park =

Park in Noda, Chiba prefecture, Japan

- ja:清水公園
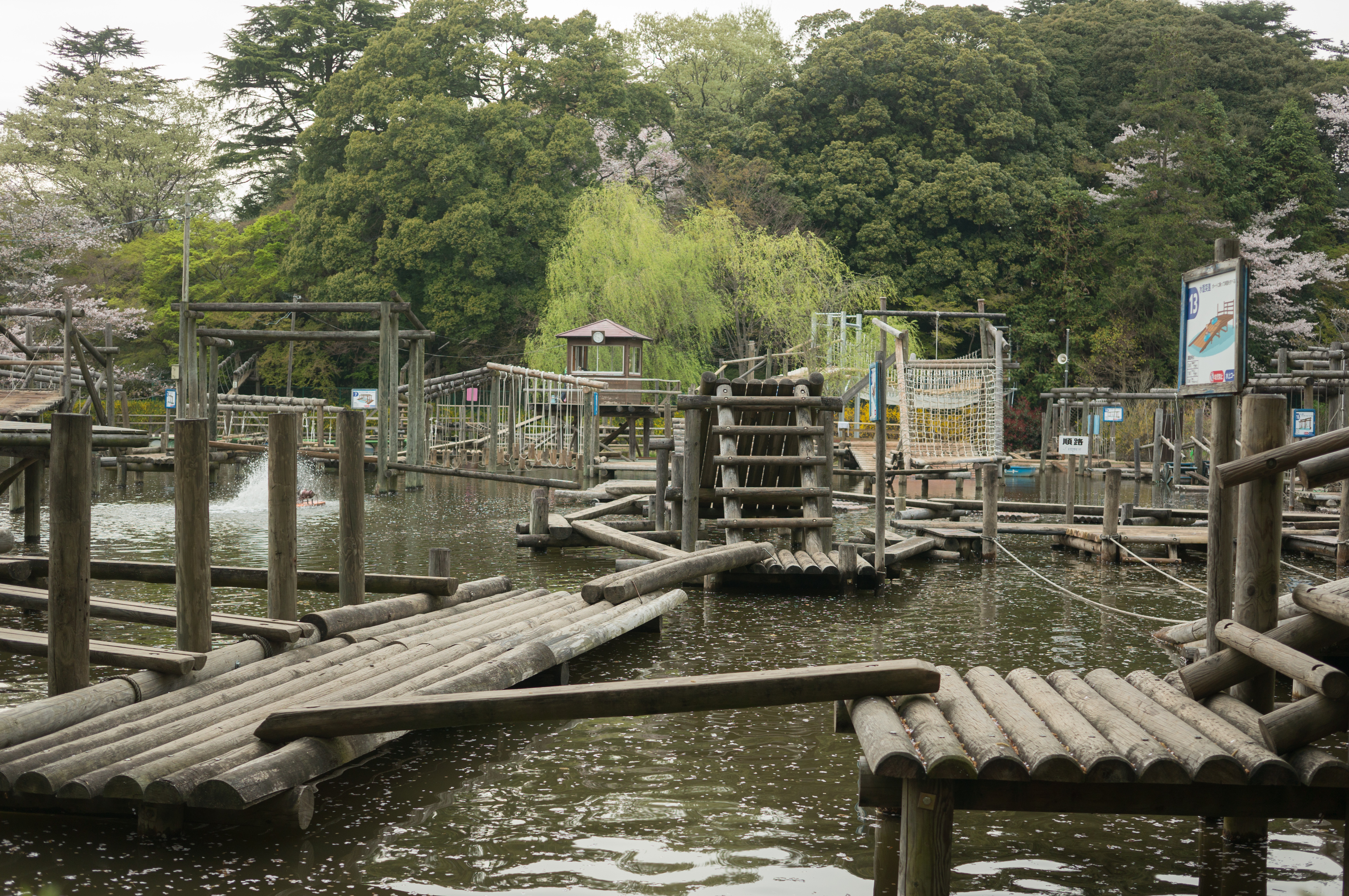
- Interactive map of Shimizu Park
- Type: Private Park and Natural Area
- Location: 906 Shimizu, Noda-shi, Chiba-ken
- Coordinates: 35°57′34″N 139°51′02″E
- Area: 280,000 m^{2} (3,000,000 sq ft)
- Created: 1894
- Operator: Senshū-sha
- Open: All year
- Status: Operating
- Website: www.shimizupark.jp

Shimizu Park (清水公園) is a privately owned park located in Noda City in north-eastern Chiba prefecture about 65 kilometers north of Tokyo. It is located 200 meters west-north-west of Shimizu-kōen Station on the Tōbu Urban Park Line, which is roughly 30 km east of its terminus in central Saitama city.

This park is renowned for its cherry blossoms, boasting over two thousand cherry blossoms in fifty varieties. Many of those bloom in late March or April when an annual Cherry Blossom Festival is held. In 1990 Shimizu Park was selected by the Japan Sakura Association as one of Japan's Top 100 Cherry Blossom Spots. Plum trees and azalea plants also abound. Each February a plum festival is held and later in spring an azalea festival follows.

== History ==
In 1894, Mogi Kasiwae, father of the first president of Noda Soy Sauce (now known as Kikkoman) rented some land on a forested area in front of Konjōin, a Buddhist temple that opened in 1398. This land was developed and opened to people of the village on April 3, 1894. When the park first opened, it was called "Syuurakuen" but since its location was in a village called Shimizu, it came to be known as "Shimizu Park." This park, which is normally open from 9:00 AM to 5:00 PM, is currently operated by Sensyusha Co, a company closely associated with Kikkoman Soy Sauce, whose roots trace back to Noda city.

== See also ==
- List of botanical gardens in Japan
