= List of places of scenic beauty of Japan (Chiba) =

This list is of the places of scenic beauty of Japan located within the Prefecture of Chiba.

== National Places of Scenic Beauty ==
As of 1 June 2026, four Places have been designated at a national level.

Site	Municipality	Comments	Image	Coordinates	Type	Ref.
Former Tokugawa Akitake Gardens (Tojōtei) Gardens 旧徳川昭武庭園（戸定邸庭園） Kyū-Tokugawa Akitake teien (Tojōtei teien)	Matsudo			35°46′39″N 139°53′56″E	1	
Former Hotta Masatomo Gardens 旧堀田正倫庭園; Kyū-Hotta Masatomo teien	Sakura			35°42′50″N 140°14′09″E	1	
Takanashi Family Gardens 髙梨氏庭園; Takanashi-shi teien	Noda			35°56′18″N 139°51′24″E	1	
Byōbugaura 屏風ケ浦; Byōbugaura	Chōshi	also a Natural Monument		35°42′22″N 140°51′12″E	8	

== Prefectural Places of Scenic Beauty ==
As of 20 February 2026 three Places have been designated at a prefectural level.

Site	Municipality	Comments	Image	Coordinates	Type	Ref.
Niemonjima 仁右衛門島; Niemonjima	Kamogawa			35°04′36″N 140°06′16″E		
Kamogawa Ōyama Senmaida 鴨川大山千枚田; Kamogawa Ōyama senmaida	Kamogawa	rice terraces; see also 100 Terraced Rice Fields of Japan		35°07′49″N 139°58′26″E		
Mount Nokogiri and its Stone Arhat Sculptures 鋸山と羅漢石像群; Nokogiri-yama to Rakan sekizō-gun	Kyonan	see also Nihon-ji		35°09′23″N 139°49′55″E		

== Municipal Places of Scenic Beauty ==
As of 1 May 2025, seven Places have been designated at a municipal level.

== Registered Places of Scenic Beauty ==
As of 19 June 2026, four Monuments have been registered (as opposed to designated) as Places of Scenic Beauty at a national level.

Place	Municipality	Comments	Image	Coordinates	Type	Ref.
Former Yoshida Family Gardens 旧吉田氏庭園 kyū-Yoshida-shi teien	Kashiwa			35°52′05″N 139°58′35″E		
Someya Family Gardens 染谷氏庭園; Someya-shi teien	Kashiwa			35°50′49″N 140°02′27″E		
Noda City Hall Gardens 野田市市民会館（旧茂木佐平治氏）庭園; Noda-shi shimin kaikan (kyū-Mogi Saheiji-shi) teien	Noda			35°56′44″N 139°51′57″E		
Enomoto Family Gardens 榎本氏庭園; Enomoto-shi teien	Abiko					

== See also ==
- Cultural Properties of Japan
- List of parks and gardens of Chiba Prefecture
- List of Historic Sites of Japan (Chiba)
