= Sakuragi Jinja =

Shinto shrine in Noda, Chiba

Coordinates: 35°56′16″N 139°52′30″E

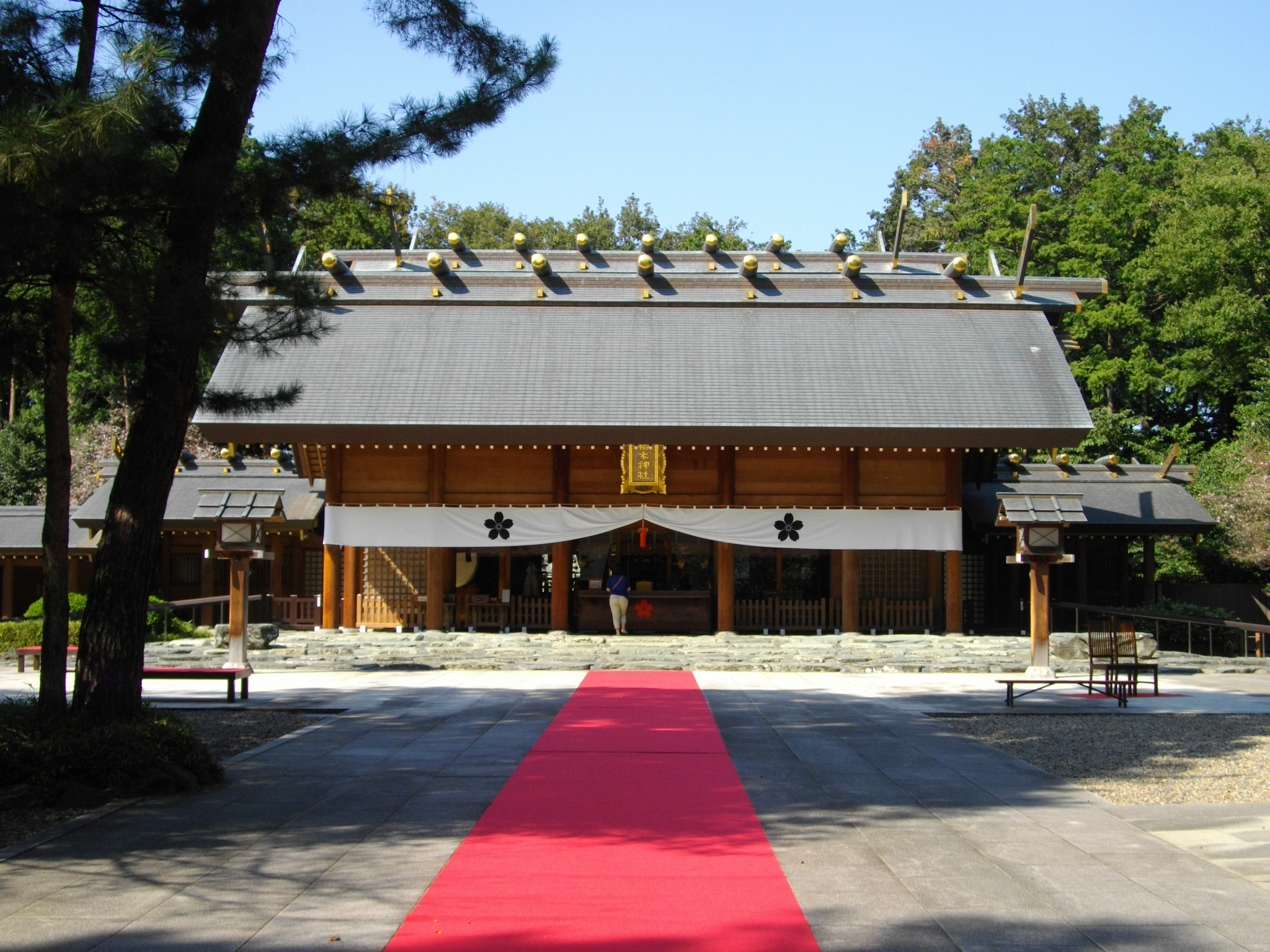

Sakuragi Jinja (櫻木神社) is a Shinto shrine in Noda, Chiba. The shrine was founded in 851 CE by a member of the Fujiwara clan and is the oldest shrine in Noda city. The shrine is a famous spot for cherry blossom viewing and its Japanese language name means "cherry blossom tree shrine".

== Enshrined deities ==
The major kami enshrined in the shrine is Izanami no Mikoto, Izanagi no Mikoto, Ukanomitama no Mikoto and Takemikazuchi no Miktoto.
