= Nanakōdai Station =

Railway station in Noda, Chiba Prefecture, Japan

TD14 Nanakōdai Station 七光台駅
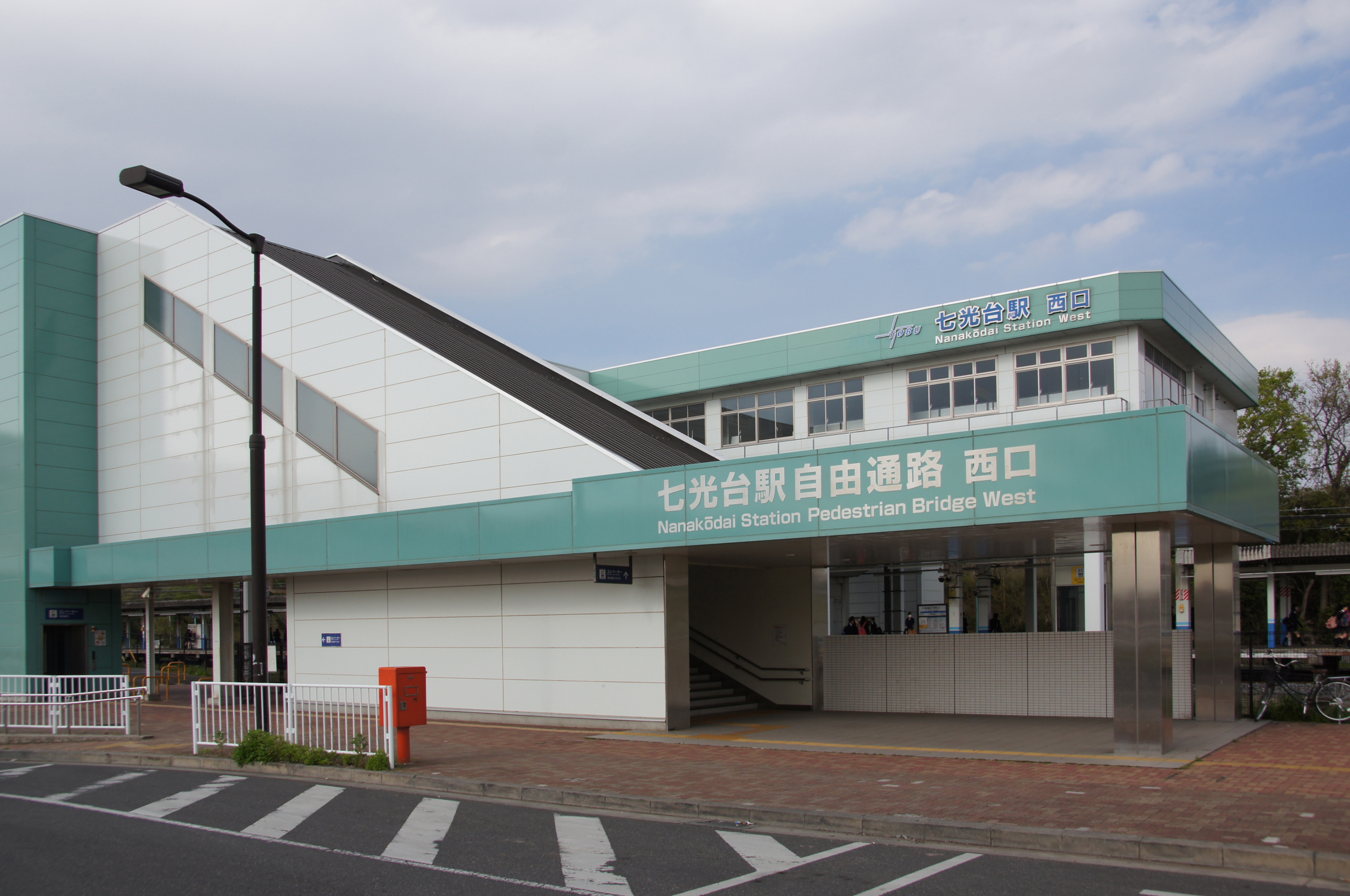
- The west side of the station in April 2013

General information
- Location: 931-5 Yoshiharu, Noda-shi, Chiba-ken 278-0057; Japan
- Coordinates: 35.9713°N 139.8529°E
- Operator: Tobu Railway
- Line: Tobu Urban Park Line
- Distance: 25.1 km from Ōmiya
- Platforms: 1 island platform
- Tracks: 2
- Connections: Bus stop

Other information
- Station code: TD-14
- Website: Official website

History
- Opened: 1 July 1968; 58 years ago

Passengers
- FY2019: 7,119 daily

Services
Preceding station	Tobu Railway	Following station
Kawama TD13 towards Ōmiya	Urban Park Liner	Shimizu-kōen TD15 towards Kashiwa
Kawama One-way operation	Urban Park Liner from Asakusa	Shimizu-kōen TD15 towards Kashiwa
Kawama TD13 towards Ōmiya	Tōbu Urban Park Line Express	Shimizu-kōen TD15 towards Funabashi
Kawama TD13 towards Ōmiya	Tōbu Urban Park Line Section Express	Shimizu-kōen TD15 towards Kashiwa
Kawama TD13 towards Ōmiya	Tōbu Urban Park Line Local	Shimizu-kōen TD15 towards Funabashi
Location
- Location within Chiba Prefecture Location within Japan

Nanakōdai Station (七光台駅, Nanakōdai-eki) is a railway station in the city of Noda, Chiba, Japan, operated by the private railway operator Tōbu Railway. The station is numbered "TD-14".

== Lines ==
Nanakōdai Station is served by the 62.7 km (39.0 mi) Tobu Urban Park Line (formerly known as the Tobu Noda Line) from Ōmiya in Saitama Prefecture to Funabashi in Chiba Prefecture, and is located 25.1 km (15.6 mi) from the western terminus of the line at Ōmiya.

== Station layout ==
The station has one island platform serving two tracks connected to the street by an overpass. The station building is elevated, and is built over the platform. Nanakōdai Depot, the main depot for the Urban Park Line, is located to the west of the line north of the station.

=== Platforms ===
1	■ Tobu Urban Park Line	for Kasukabe, Iwatsuki, and Ōmiya
2	■ Tobu Urban Park Line	for Nodashi, Kashiwa, and Funabashi

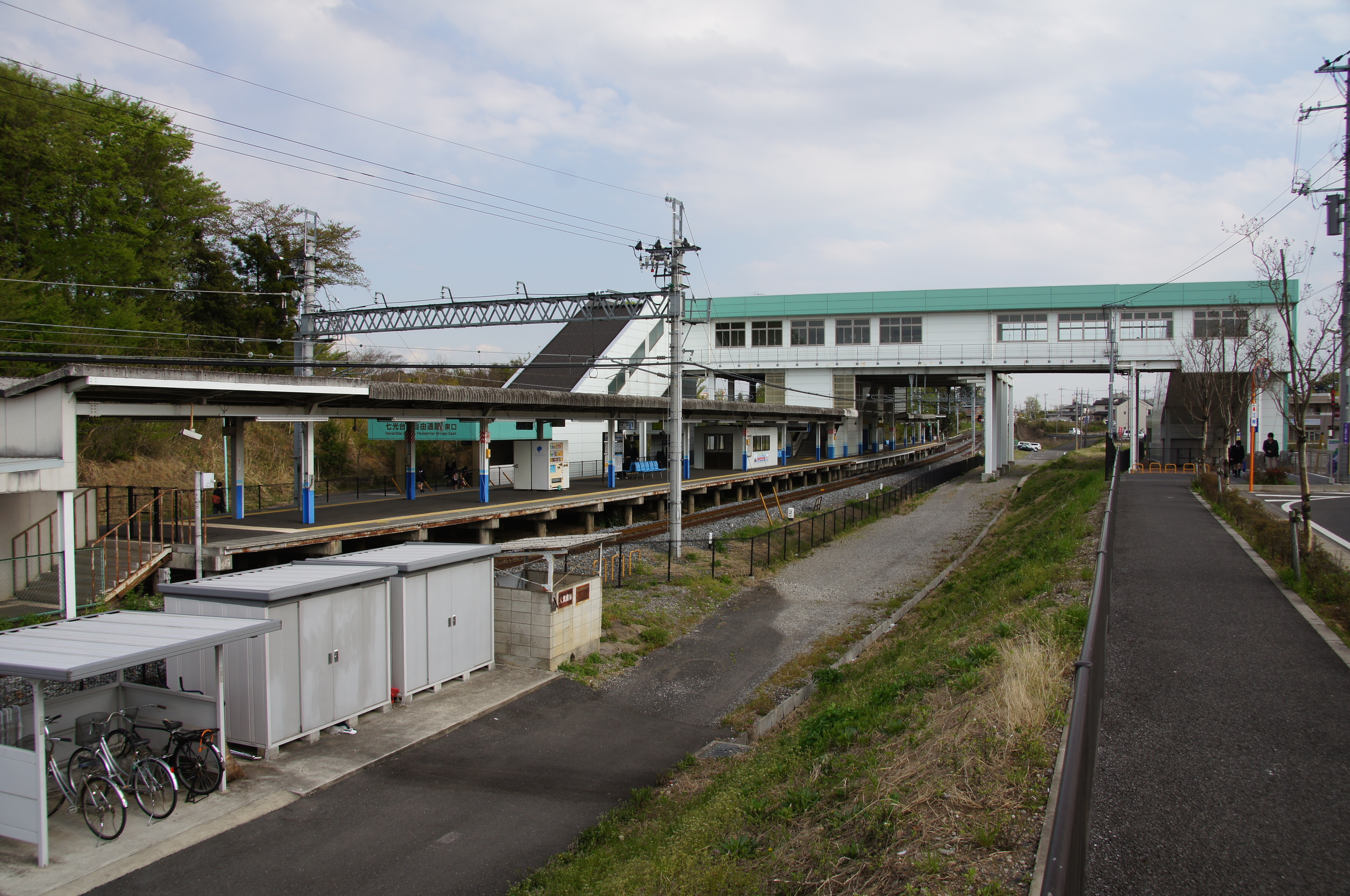
Overview of the station from the west side, April 2013

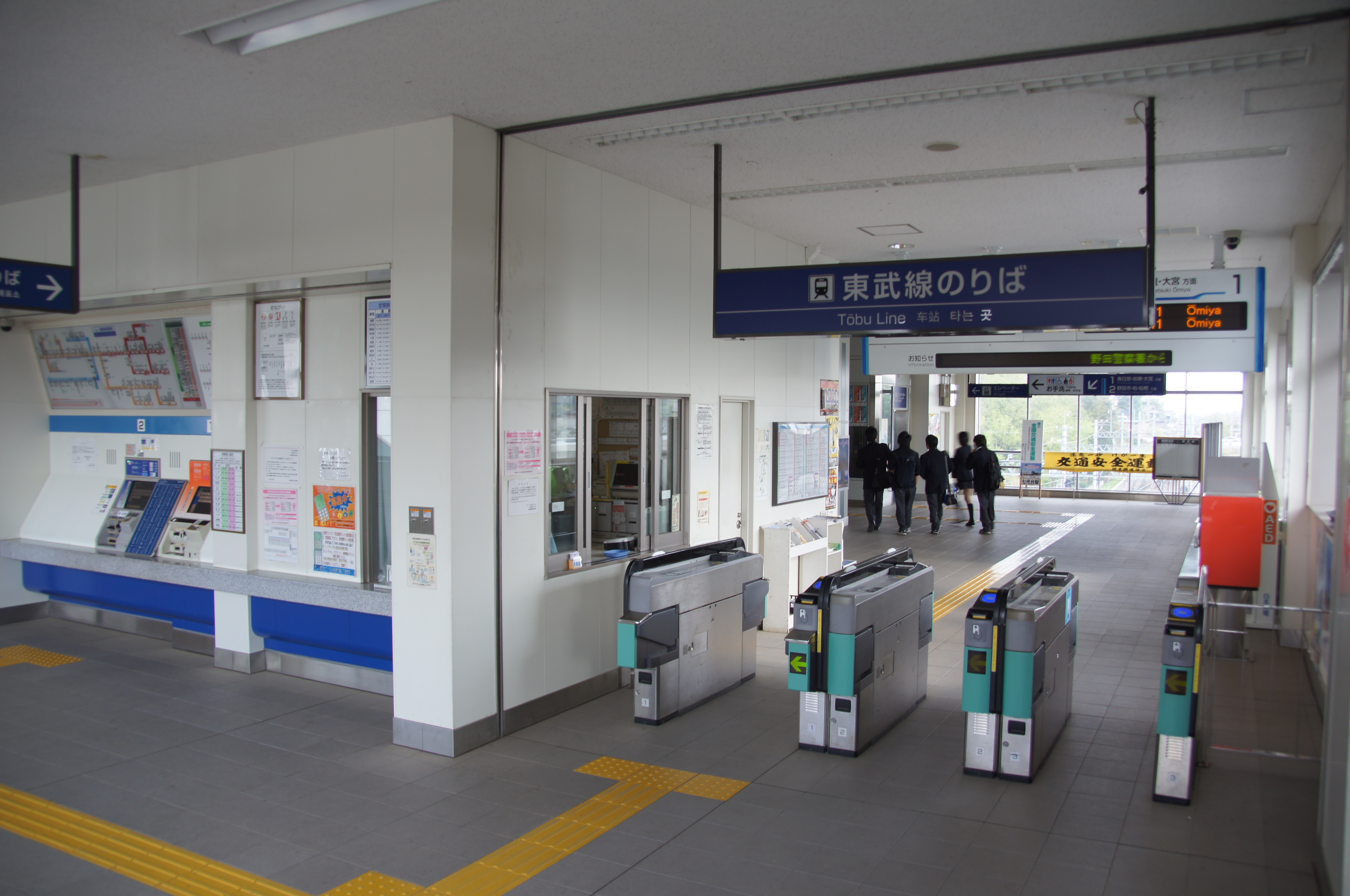
Ticket vending machines and ticket barriers, April 2013

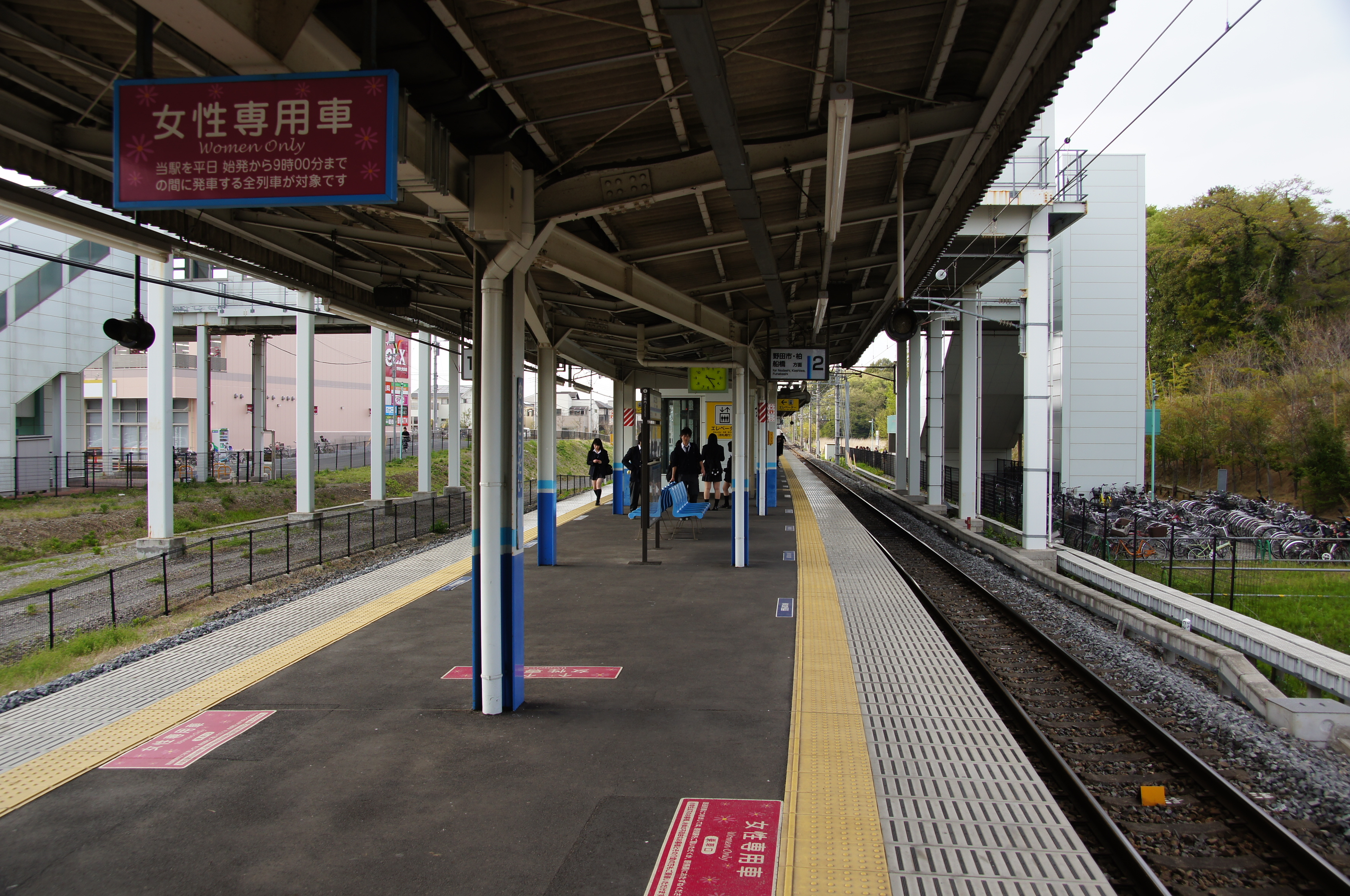
View from the south end of the platform, April 2013

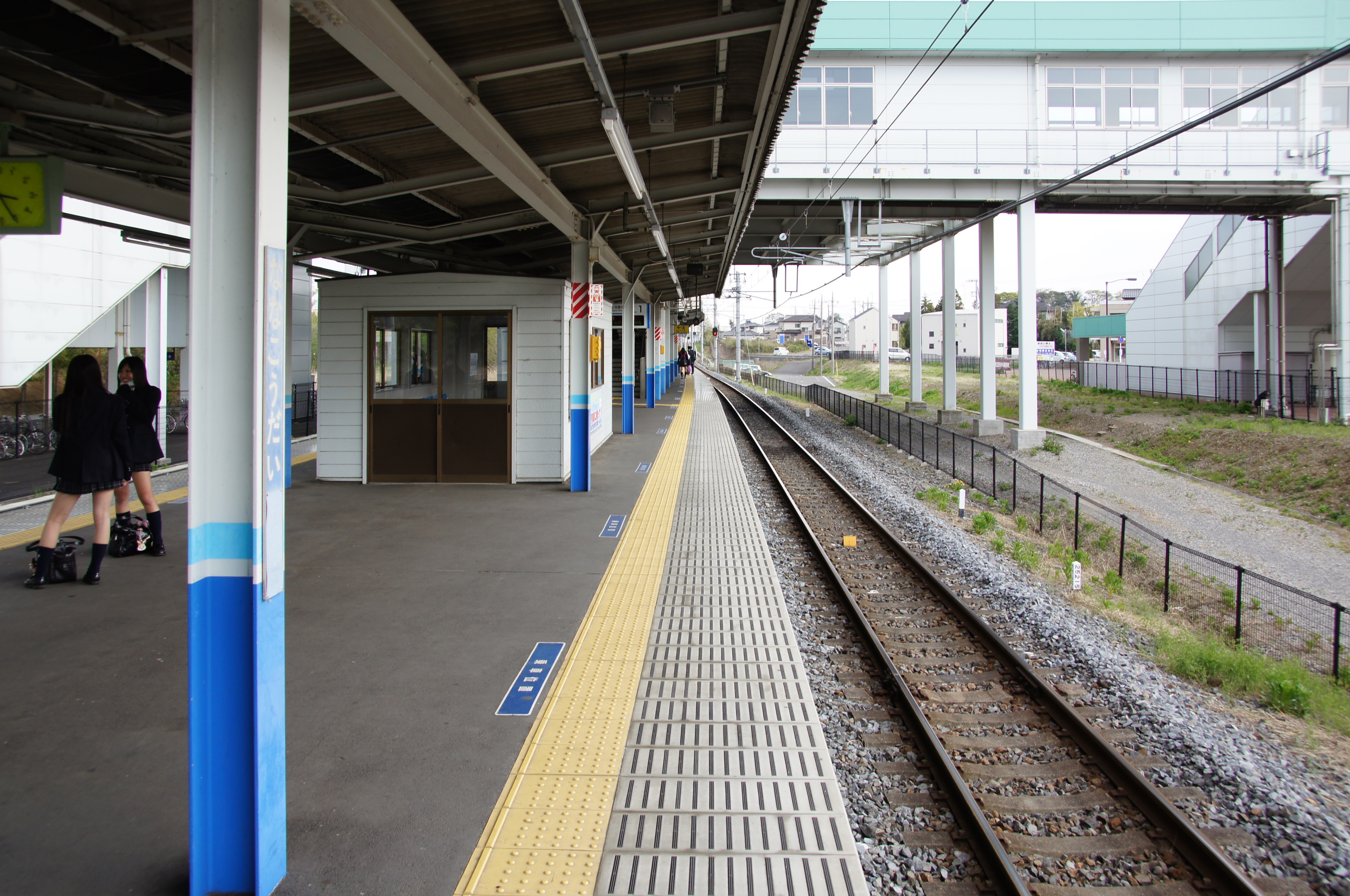
View from the north end of the platform with the waiting room visible, April 2013

== History ==
Nanakōdai Station was opened on July 1, 1968.

From 17 March 2012, station numbering was introduced on the Tobu Urban Park Line, with Nanakōdai Station becoming "TD-14".

== Passenger statistics ==
In fiscal 2018, the station was used by an average of 7,119 passengers daily.

== Surrounding area ==
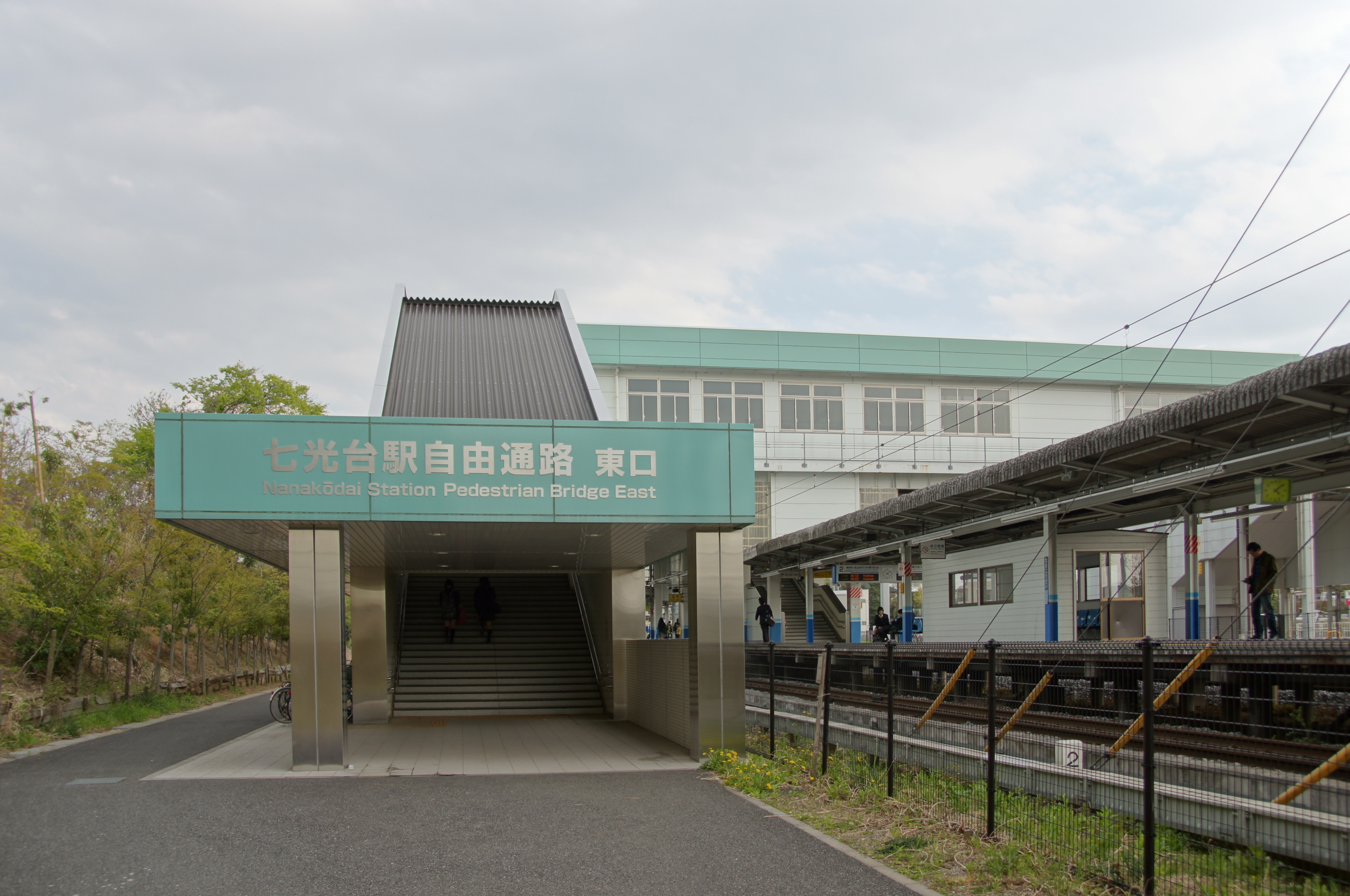
The east entrance in April 2013

- Noda Chuo High School

== See also ==
- List of railway stations in Japan
