= Atago Station (Chiba) =

Railway station in Noda, Chiba Prefecture, Japan

TD16 Atago Station 愛宕駅
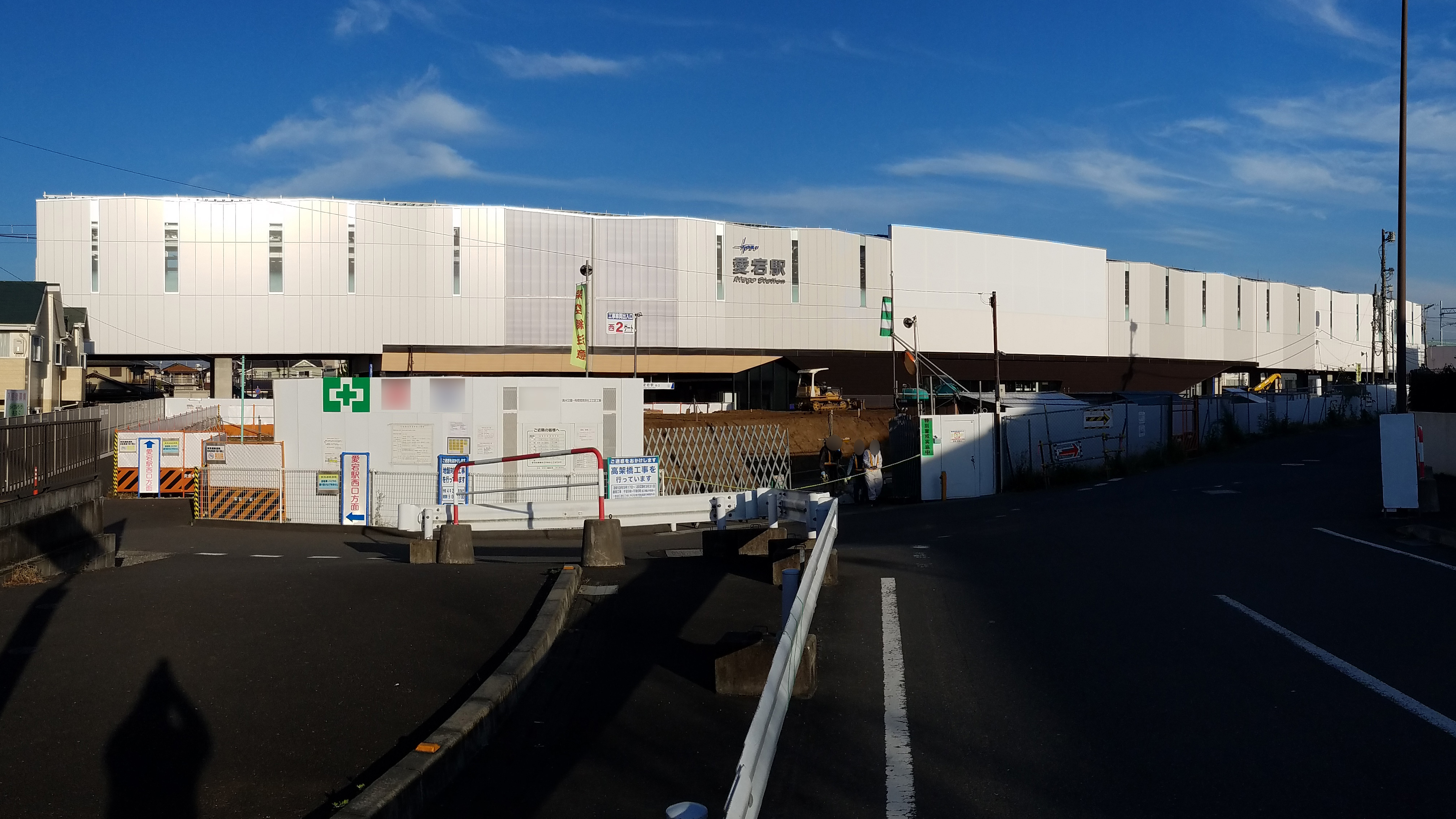
- Atago Station in November 2021

General information
- Location: 1217 Nakanodai, Noda-shi, Chiba-ken 278-0035; Japan
- Coordinates: 35°57′01″N 139°51′53″E
- Operator: Tobu Railway
- Line: Tobu Urban Park Line
- Distance: 27.7 km from Ōmiya
- Platforms: 2 side platforms

Other information
- Station code: TD-16
- Website: Official website

History
- Opened: 1 September 1929; 96 years ago

Passengers
- FY2019: 9,900 daily

Services
Preceding station	Tobu Railway	Following station
Shimizu-kōen TD15 towards Ōmiya	Urban Park Liner	Nodashi TD17 towards Kashiwa
Shimizu-kōen One-way operation	Urban Park Liner from Asakusa	Nodashi TD17 towards Kashiwa
Shimizu-kōen TD15 towards Ōmiya	Tōbu Urban Park Line Express	Nodashi TD17 towards Funabashi
Shimizu-kōen TD15 towards Ōmiya	Tōbu Urban Park Line Section Express	Nodashi TD17 towards Kashiwa
Shimizu-kōen TD15 towards Ōmiya	Tōbu Urban Park Line Local	Nodashi TD17 towards Funabashi
Location
- Location within Chiba Prefecture Location within Japan

Atago Station (愛宕駅, Atago-eki) is a railway station in the city of Noda, Chiba, Japan, operated by the private railway operator Tōbu Railway. The station is numbered "TD-16".

== Lines ==
Atago Station is served by the 62.7 km (39.0 mi) Tobu Urban Park Line (also known as the Tōbu Noda Line) from Ōmiya in Saitama Prefecture to Funabashi in Chiba Prefecture, and lies 27.7 km (17.2 mi) from the line's western terminus at Ōmiya.

== Station layout ==
Atago station has two opposed elevated side platforms. The platforms are connected to the ground level by escalators and lifts.

Prior to elevation, Atago station had two opposed side platforms connected by a footbridge.

=== Platforms ===
1	■ Tobu Urban Park Line	for Kasukabe, Iwatsuki, and Ōmiya
2	■ Tobu Urban Park Line	for Nodashi, Kashiwa, and Funabashi

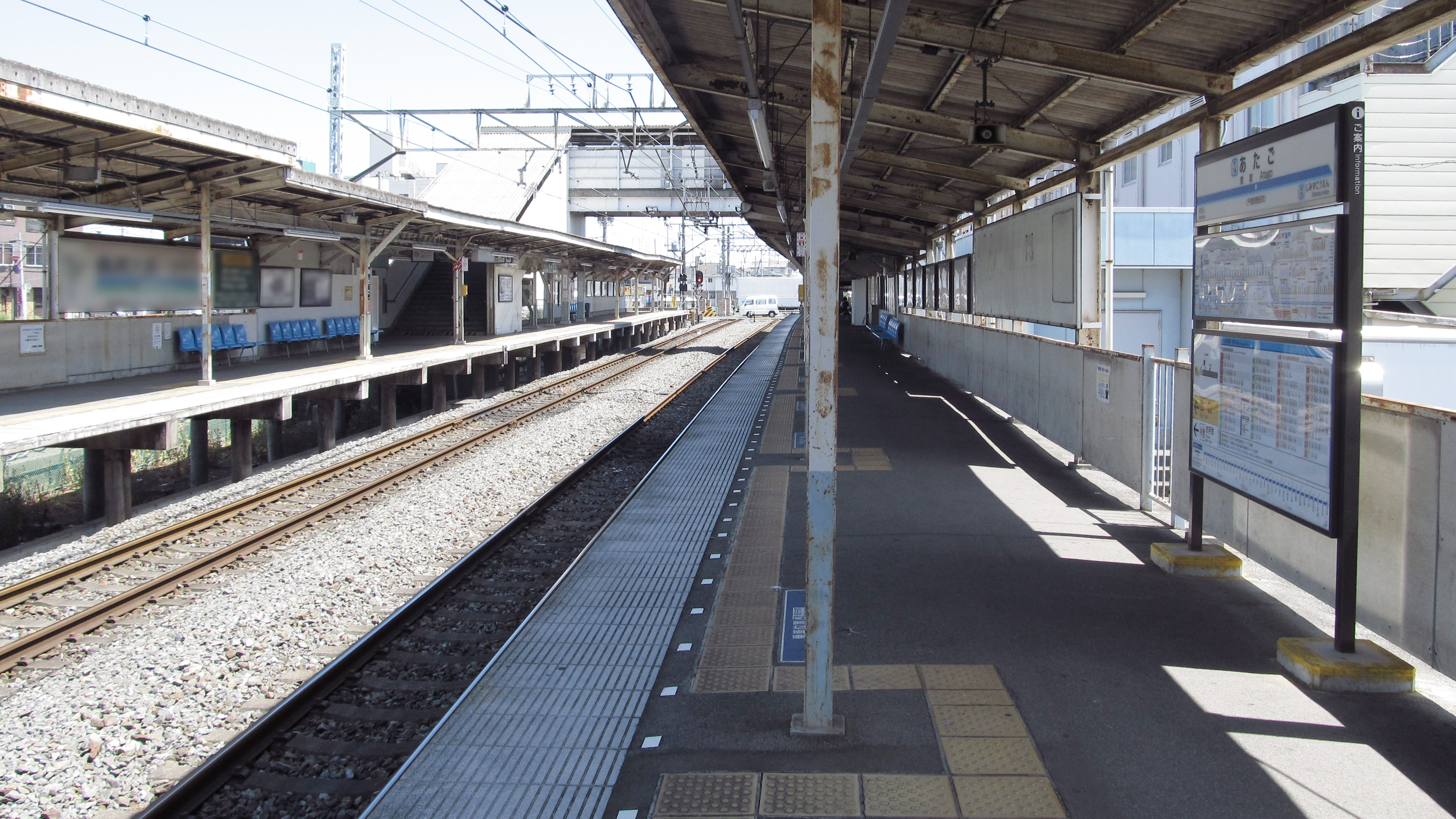
The old ground-level platforms in March 2013

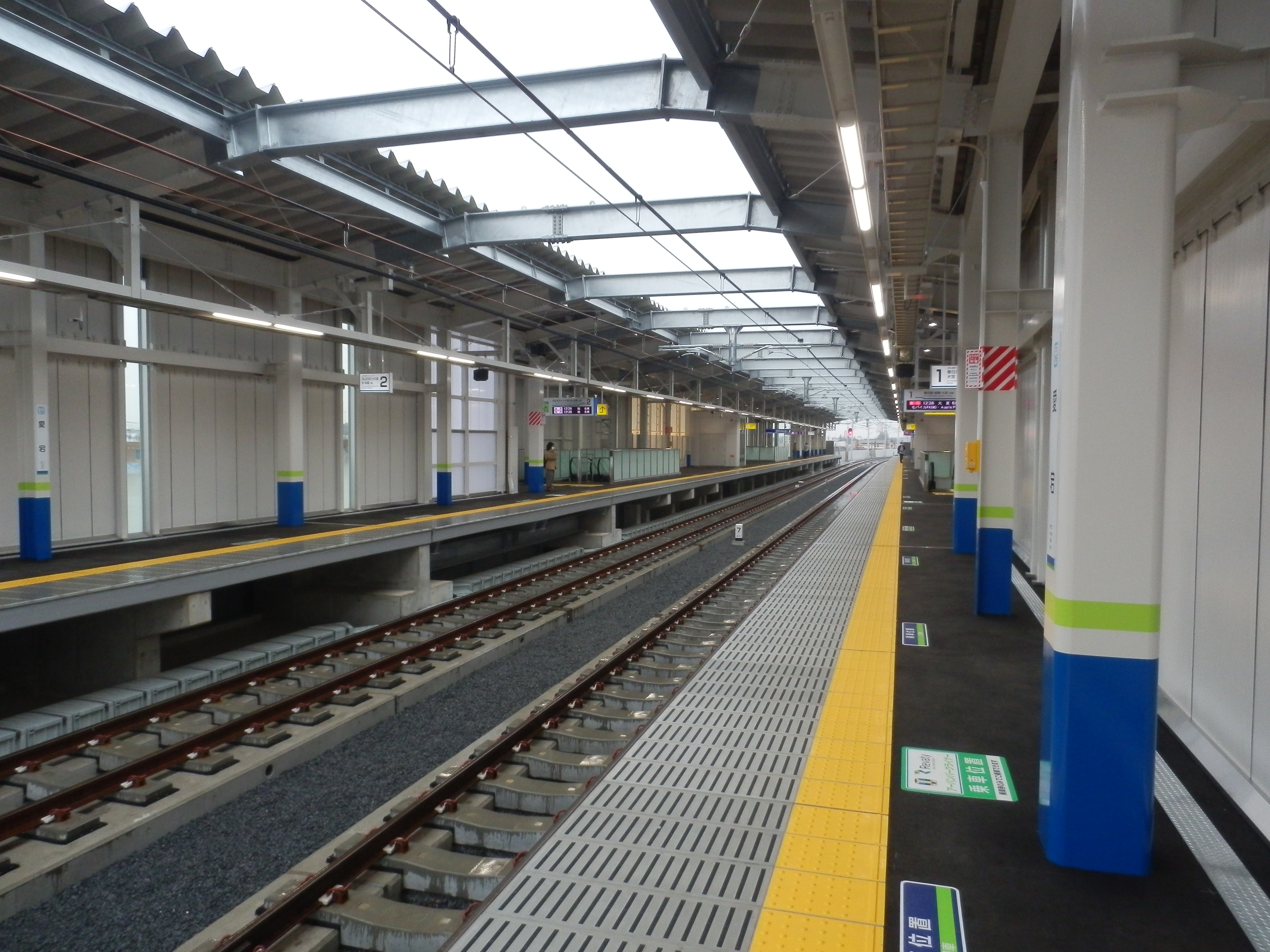
The new elevated platforms in March 2021

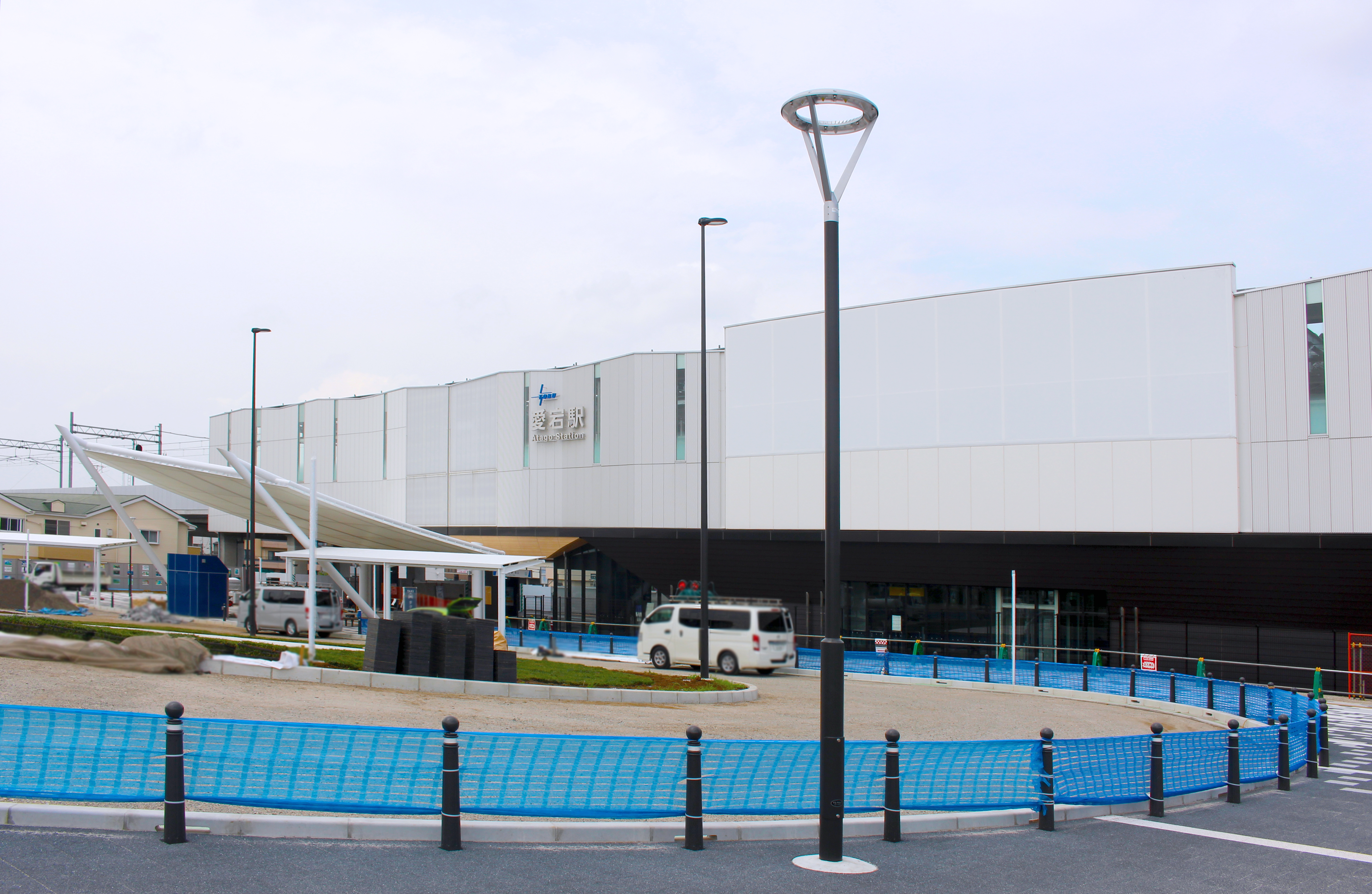
Western entrance of the new station in June 2024

== History ==
Atago Station opened on September 1, 1929.

From 17 March 2012, station numbering was introduced on the Tobu Noda Line, with Atago Station becoming "TD-16".

From 1 April 2014, the Tobu Noda Line was rebranded the Tobu Urban Park Line (東武アーバンパークライン). By that time, a project to elevate the station was on-going, with the aim to complete the project in 2017. The elevated station started operation with one island platform and two tracks on 28 March 2021.

== Passenger statistics ==
In fiscal 2018, the station was used by an average of 9,900 passengers daily.

== Surrounding area ==
- Noda City Hall
- Atago Jinja
- Noda Cultural Center
- Noda Post Office
- Bujinkan Honbu Dojo
