= Shimizu-kōen Station =

Railway station in Noda, Chiba Prefecture, Japan

TD15 Shimizu-kōen Station 清水公園駅
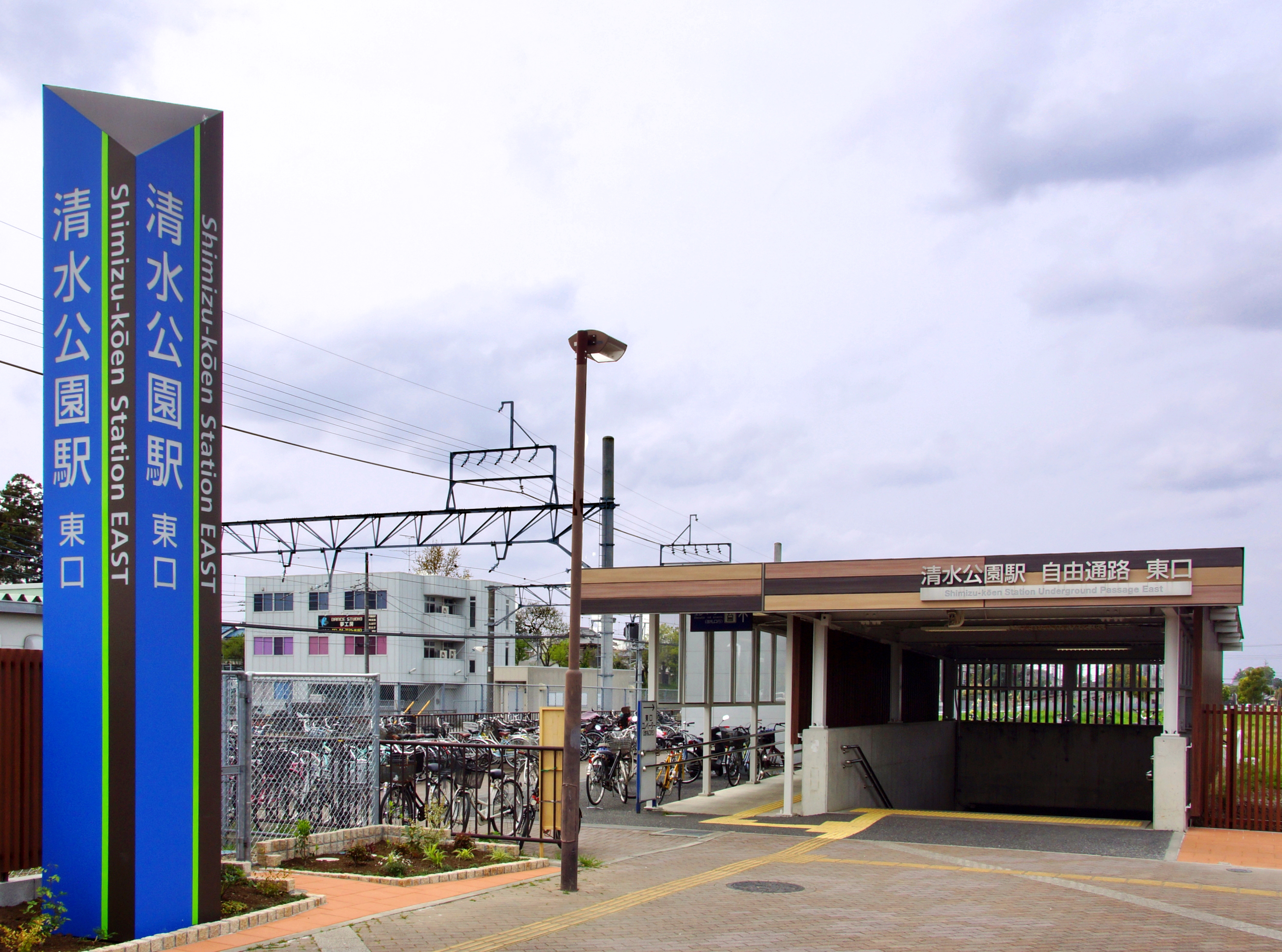
- The east entrance in April 2016

General information
- Location: 1-32-2 Shimizukōen-Higashi, Noda-shi, Chiba-ken 278-0047; Japan
- Coordinates: 35.9596°N 139.8596°E
- Operator: Tobu Railway
- Line: Tobu Urban Park Line
- Distance: 26.6 km from Ōmiya
- Platforms: 1 island platform
- Tracks: 3

Other information
- Station code: TD-15
- Website: Official website

History
- Opened: 1 September 1929; 96 years ago

Passengers
- FY2019: 5,101 daily

Services
Preceding station	Tobu Railway	Following station
Nanakōdai TD14 towards Ōmiya	Urban Park Liner	Atago TD16 towards Kashiwa
Nanakōdai One-way operation	Urban Park Liner from Asakusa	Atago TD16 towards Kashiwa
Nanakōdai TD14 towards Ōmiya	Tōbu Urban Park Line Express	Atago TD16 towards Funabashi
Nanakōdai TD14 towards Ōmiya	Tōbu Urban Park Line Section Express	Atago TD16 towards Kashiwa
Nanakōdai TD14 towards Ōmiya	Tōbu Urban Park Line Local	Atago TD16 towards Funabashi
Location
- Location within Chiba Prefecture Location within Japan

Shimizu-kōen Station (清水公園駅, Shimizu-kōen-eki) is a railway station in the city of Noda, Chiba, Japan, operated by the private railway operator Tōbu Railway. The station is numbered "TD-18".

== Lines ==
Shimizu-kōen Station is served by the 62.7 km (39.0 mi) Tobu Urban Park Line (also known as the Tōbu Noda Line) from Ōmiya in Saitama Prefecture to Funabashi in Chiba Prefecture, and lies 26.6 km (16.5 mi) from the western terminus of the line at Ōmiya.

== Station layout ==
Shimizu-kōen Station has one ground-level island platform serving two tracks. The platform is linked to entrance on the east and west entrances by an underground passage. The former platform 1 (a side platform) is no longer in use.

=== Platforms ===
2	■ Tobu Urban Park Line	For Kasukabe, Iwatsuki, Ōmiya
3	■ Tobu Urban Park Line	For Nodashi, Kashiwa, Funabashi

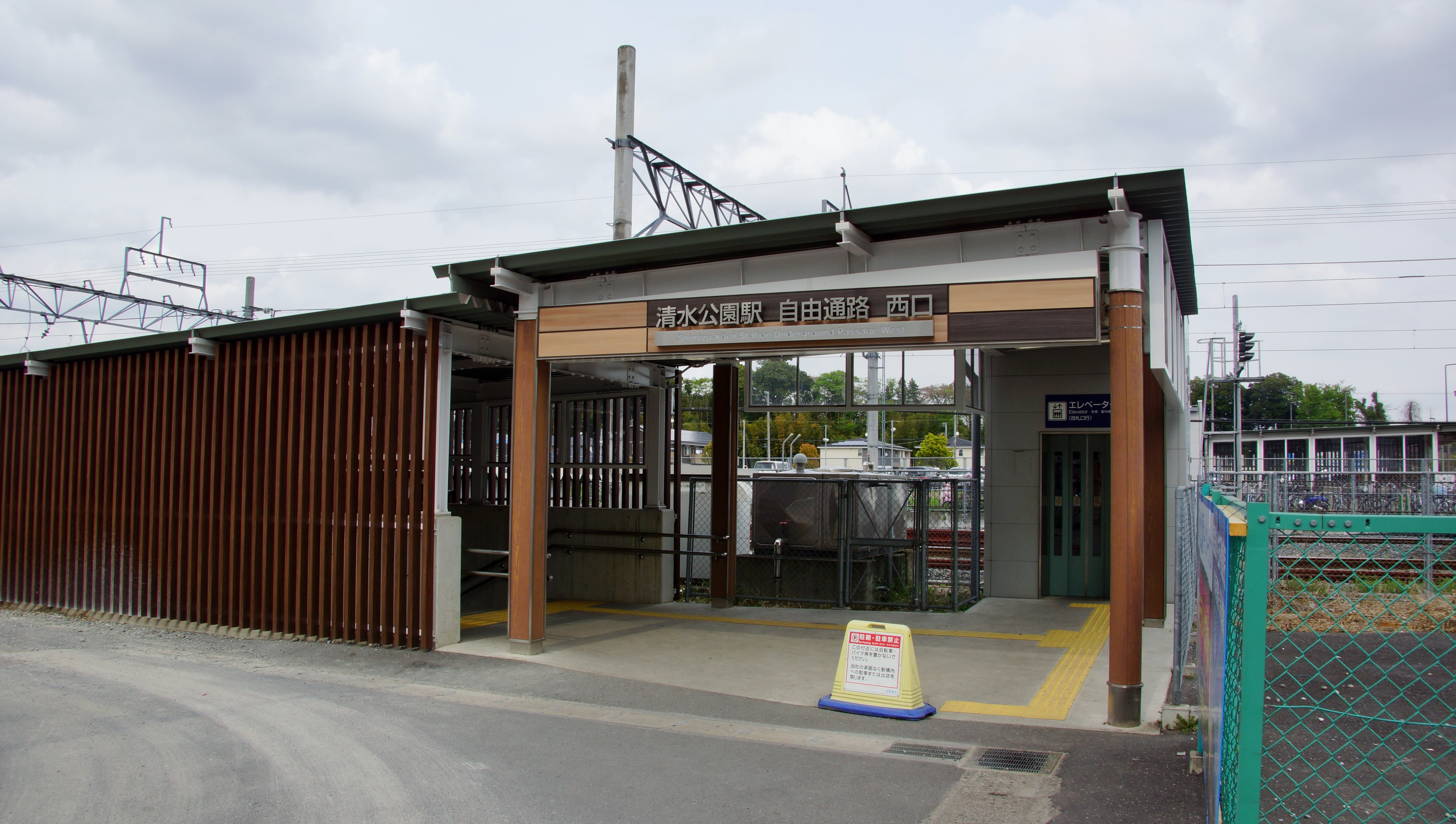
The west entrance in April 2016

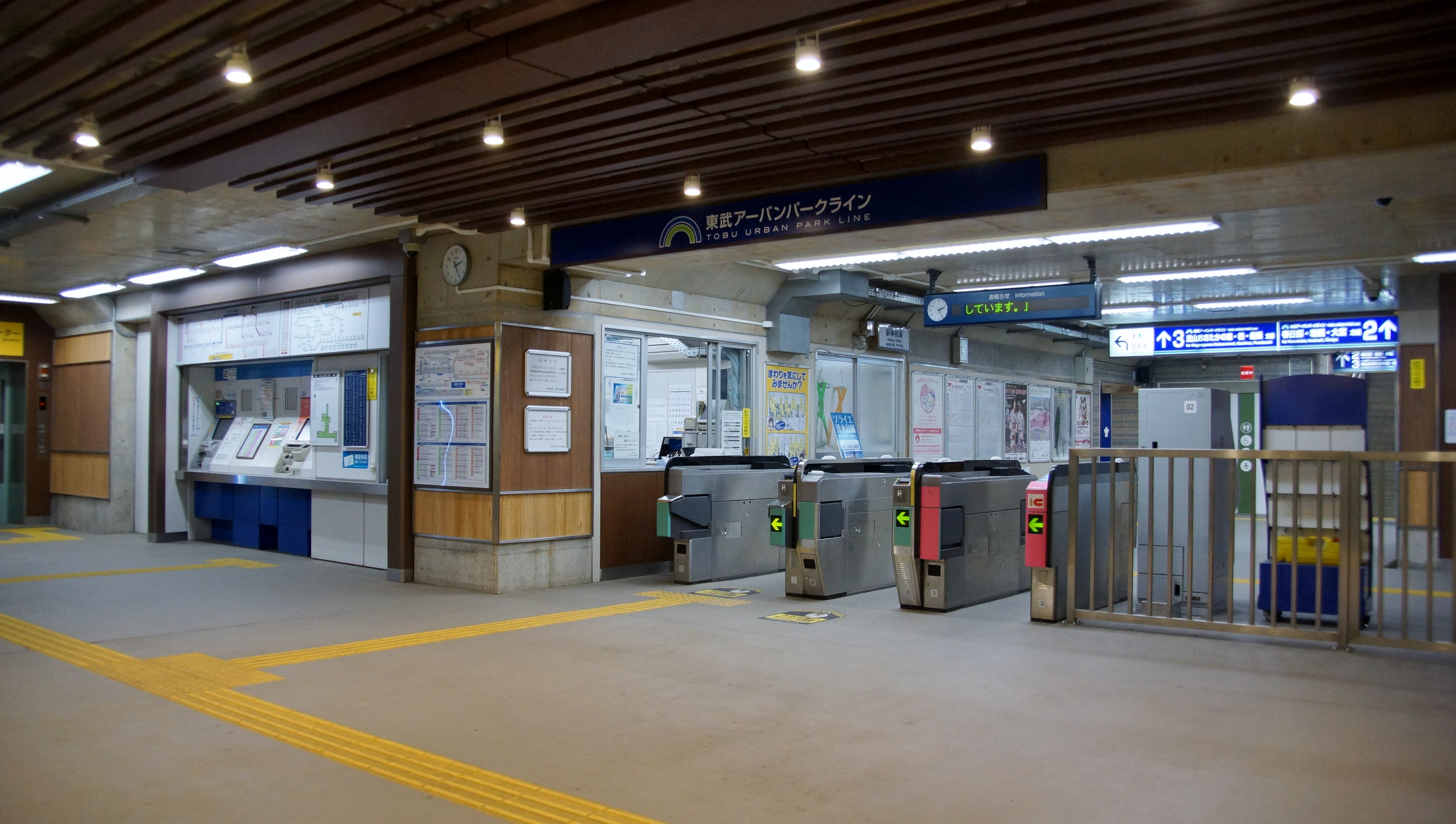
The ticket barriers in April 2016

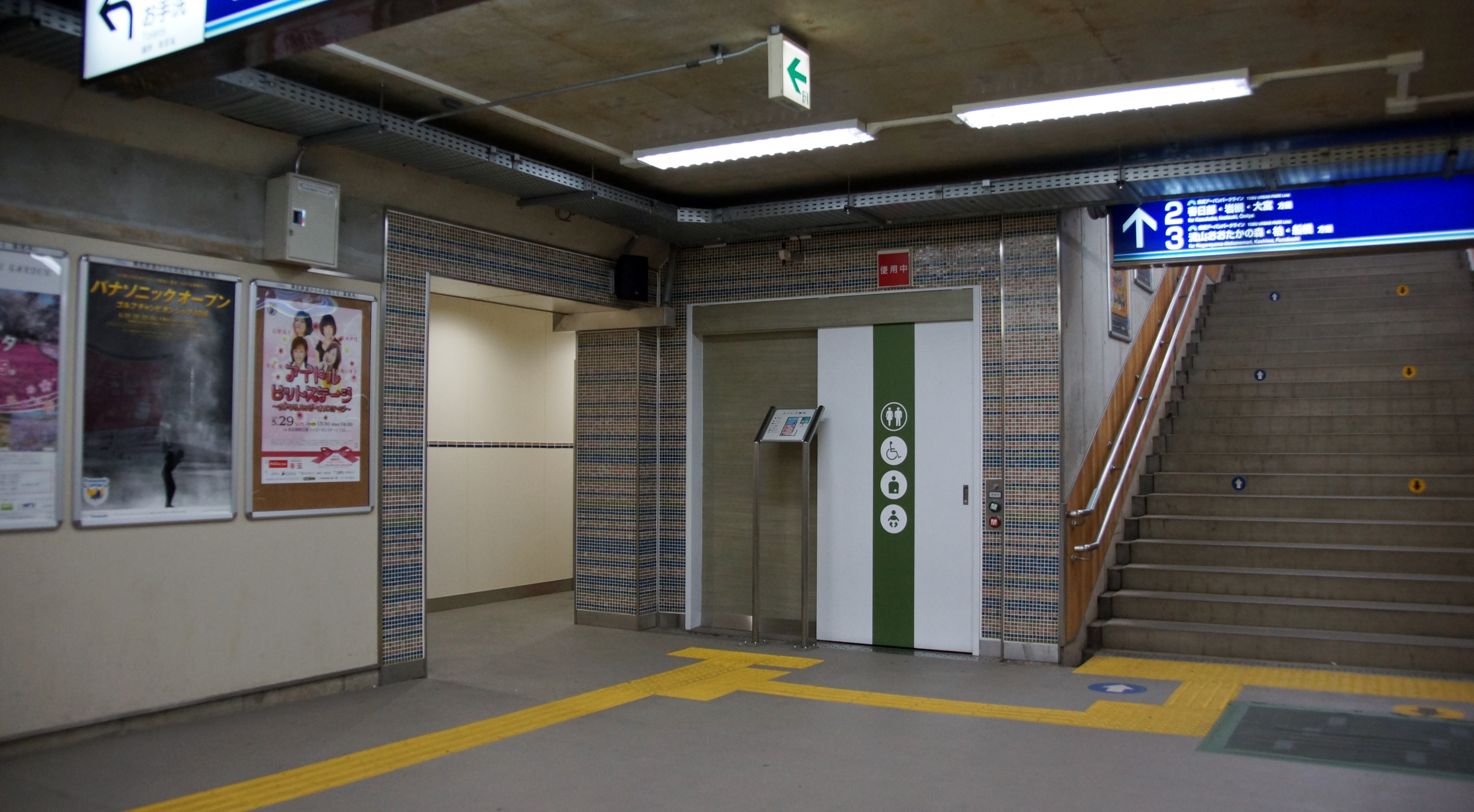
The station toilets in April 2016

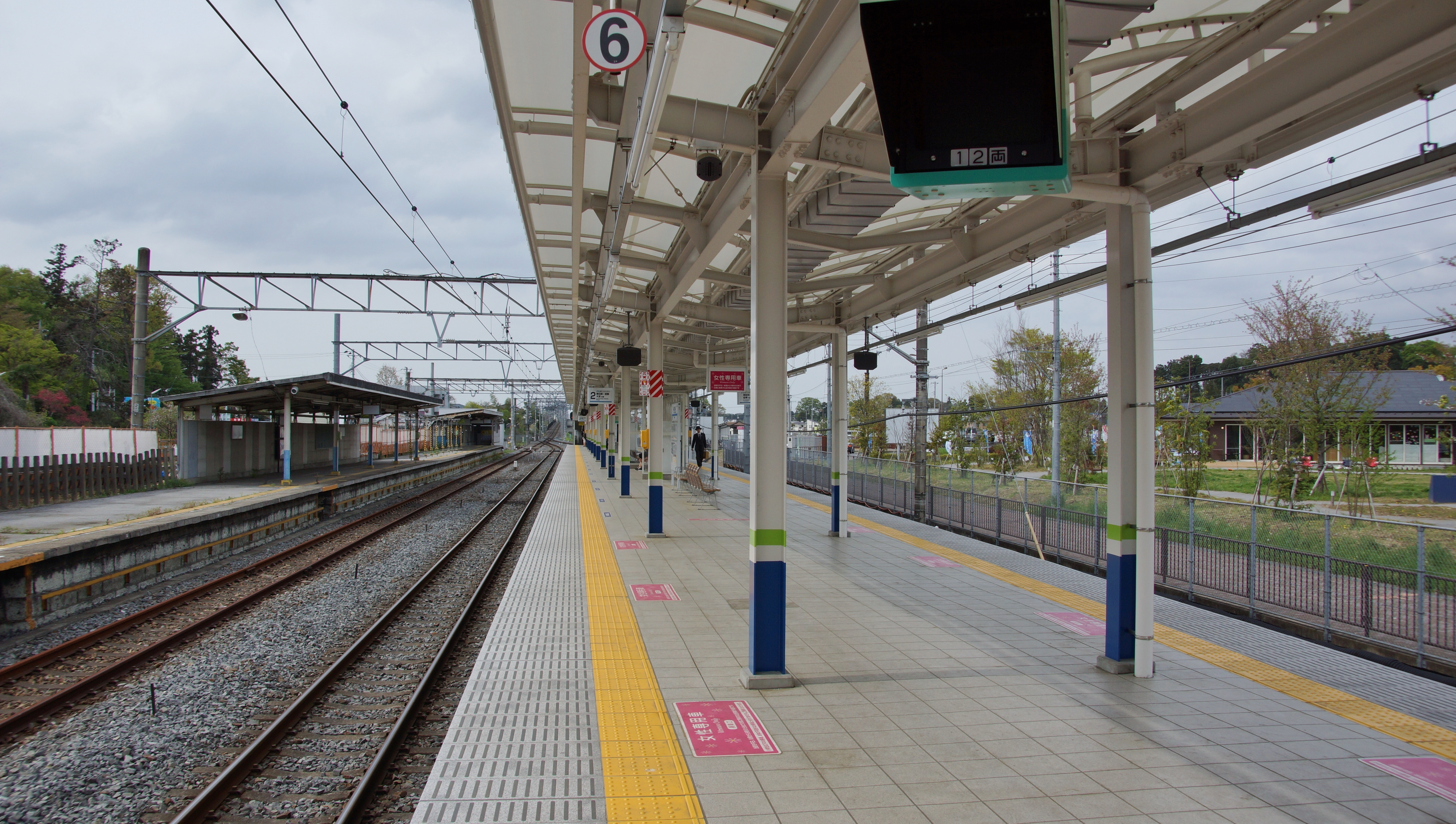
The platforms in April 2016, with the disused platform 1 on the left

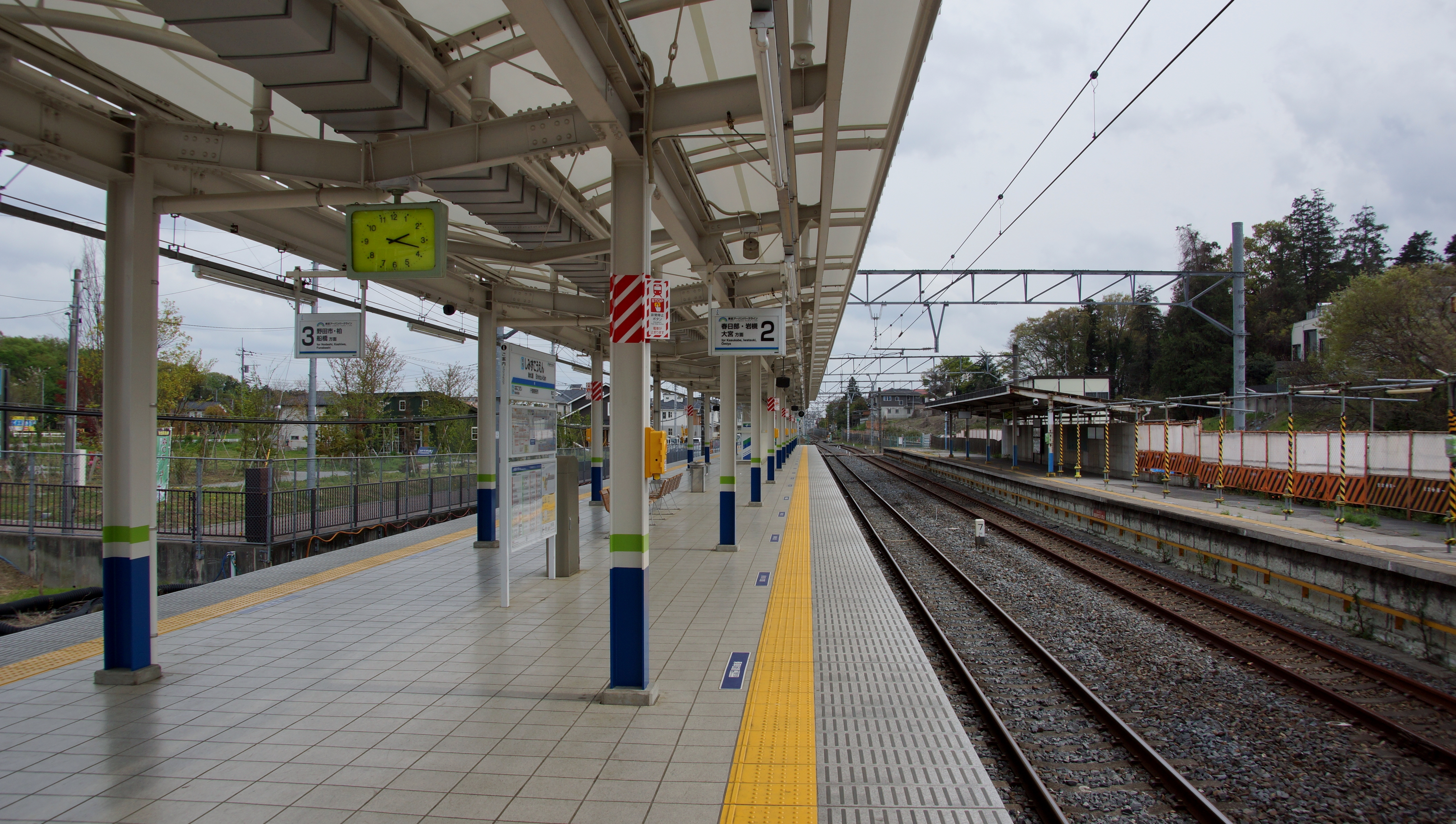
The platforms in April 2016, with the disused platform 1 on the right

== History ==
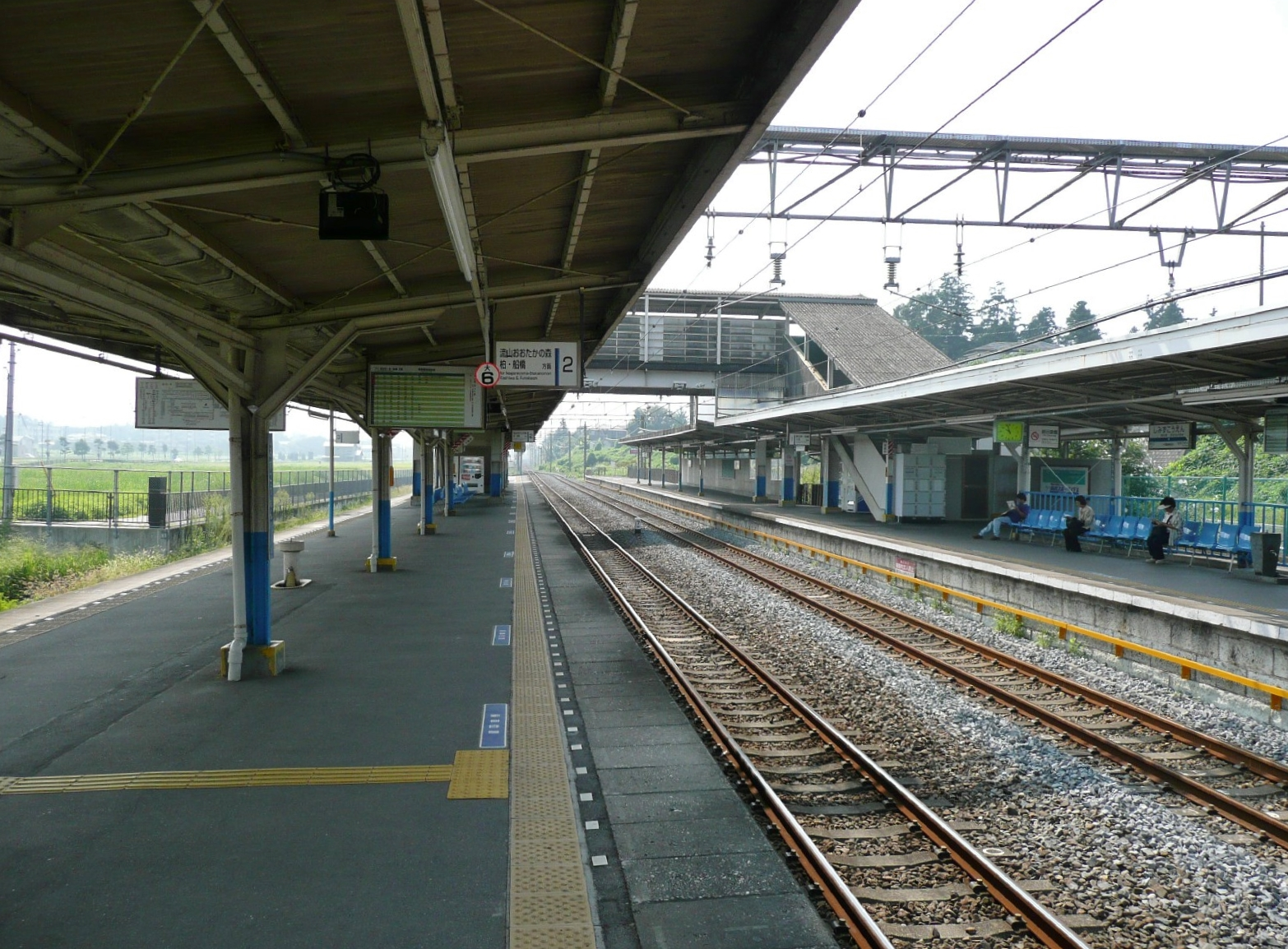
The platforms in September 2008, with the connecting footbridge still in use

Shimizu-kōen Station opened on 1 September 1929. The station building was reconstructed as an underground structure, which was completed on 12 March 2007. From 17 March 2012, station numbering was introduced on the Tobu Noda Line, with Shimizu-kōen Station becoming "TD-15".

== Passenger statistics ==
In fiscal 2018, the station was used by an average of 5,101 passengers daily. The passenger figures for previous years are as shown below.

Fiscal year	Daily average
2010	3,892
2011	3,871
2012	4,102
2013	4,085
2014	4,208

== Surrounding area ==
- Shimizu Park
- Chiba Prefectural Shimizu High School
- Noda-Shimizu Post Office
- Bujinkan Ishizuka Dojo

== See also ==
- List of railway stations in Japan
