= Kawama Station =

Railway station in Noda, Chiba Prefecture, Japan

TD13 Kawama Station 川間駅
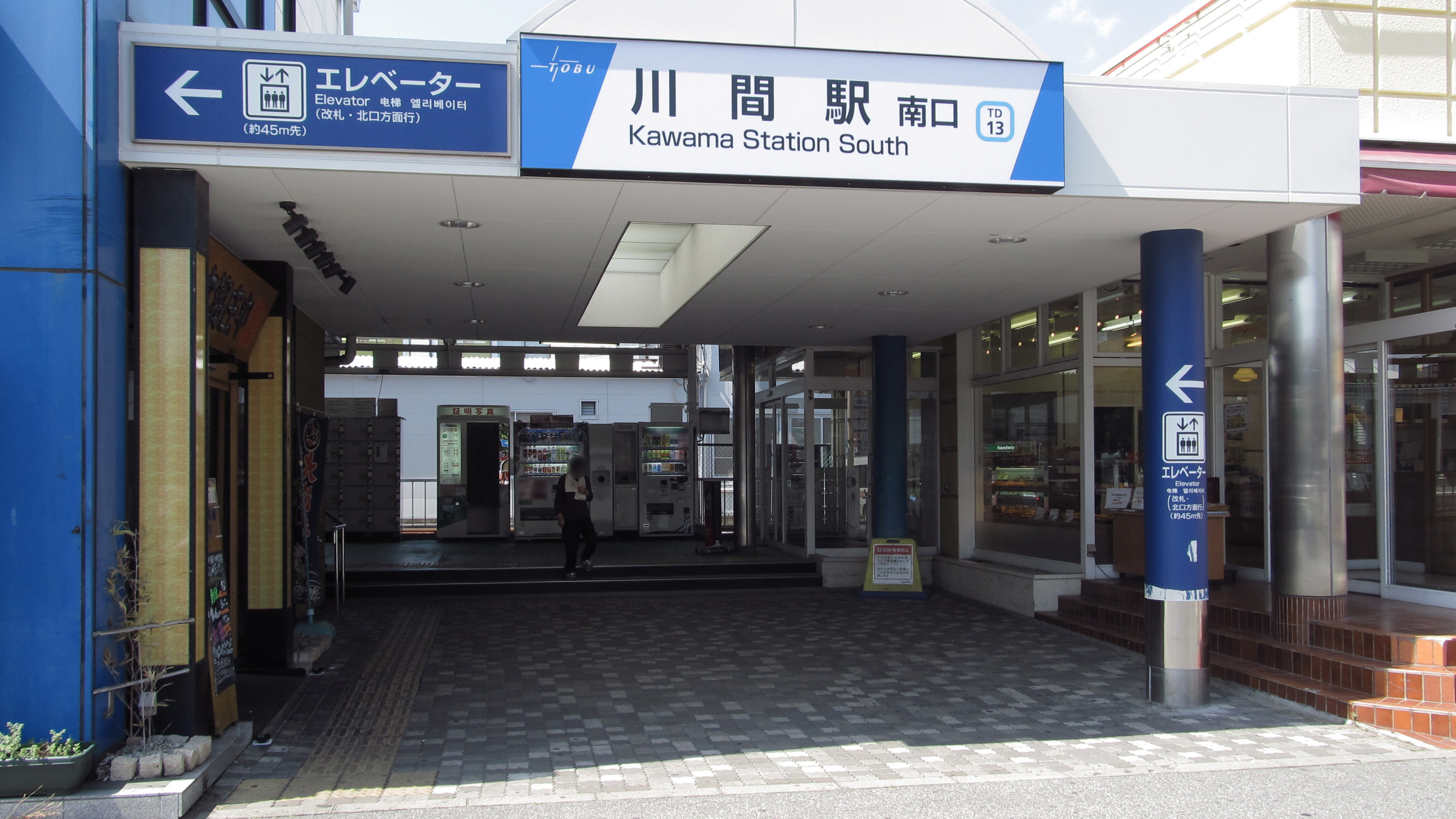
- The south entrance to Kawama Station in May 2013

General information
- Location: 832 Ozaki, Noda-shi, Chiba-ken 270-0235; Japan
- Coordinates: 35.9790°N 139.8341°E
- Operator: Tobu Railway
- Line: Tobu Urban Park Line
- Distance: 22.9 km from Ōmiya
- Platforms: 1 island platform
- Tracks: 2

Other information
- Station code: TD-13
- Website: Official website

History
- Opened: 1 October 1930; 95 years ago

Passengers
- FY2019: 17,328 daily

Services
Preceding station	Tobu Railway	Following station
Minami-Sakurai TD12 towards Ōmiya	Urban Park Liner	Nanakōdai TD14 towards Kashiwa
Minami-Sakurai One-way operation	Urban Park Liner from Asakusa	Nanakōdai TD14 towards Kashiwa
Minami-Sakurai TD12 towards Ōmiya	Tōbu Urban Park Line Express	Nanakōdai TD14 towards Funabashi
Minami-Sakurai TD12 towards Ōmiya	Tōbu Urban Park Line Section Express	Nanakōdai TD14 towards Kashiwa
Minami-Sakurai TD12 towards Ōmiya	Tōbu Urban Park Line Local	Nanakōdai TD14 towards Funabashi
Location
- Location within Chiba Prefecture Location within Japan

Kawama Station (川間駅, Kawama-eki) is a railway station in the city of Noda, Chiba, Japan, operated by the private railway operator Tōbu Railway. The station is numbered "TD-13".

== Lines ==
Kawama Station is served by the 62.7 km (39.0 mi) Tobu Urban Park Line (also known as the Tōbu Noda Line) from Ōmiya in Saitama Prefecture to Funabashi in Chiba Prefecture and lies 22.9 km (14.2 mi) from the western terminus of the line at Ōmiya.

== Station layout ==
The station consists of one island platform serving two tracks, connected to the station building by an underground passage.

=== Platforms ===
1	■ Tobu Urban Park Line	for Nodashi, Kashiwa, and Funabashi
2	■ Tobu Urban Park Line	for Kasukabe, Iwatsuki, and Ōmiya

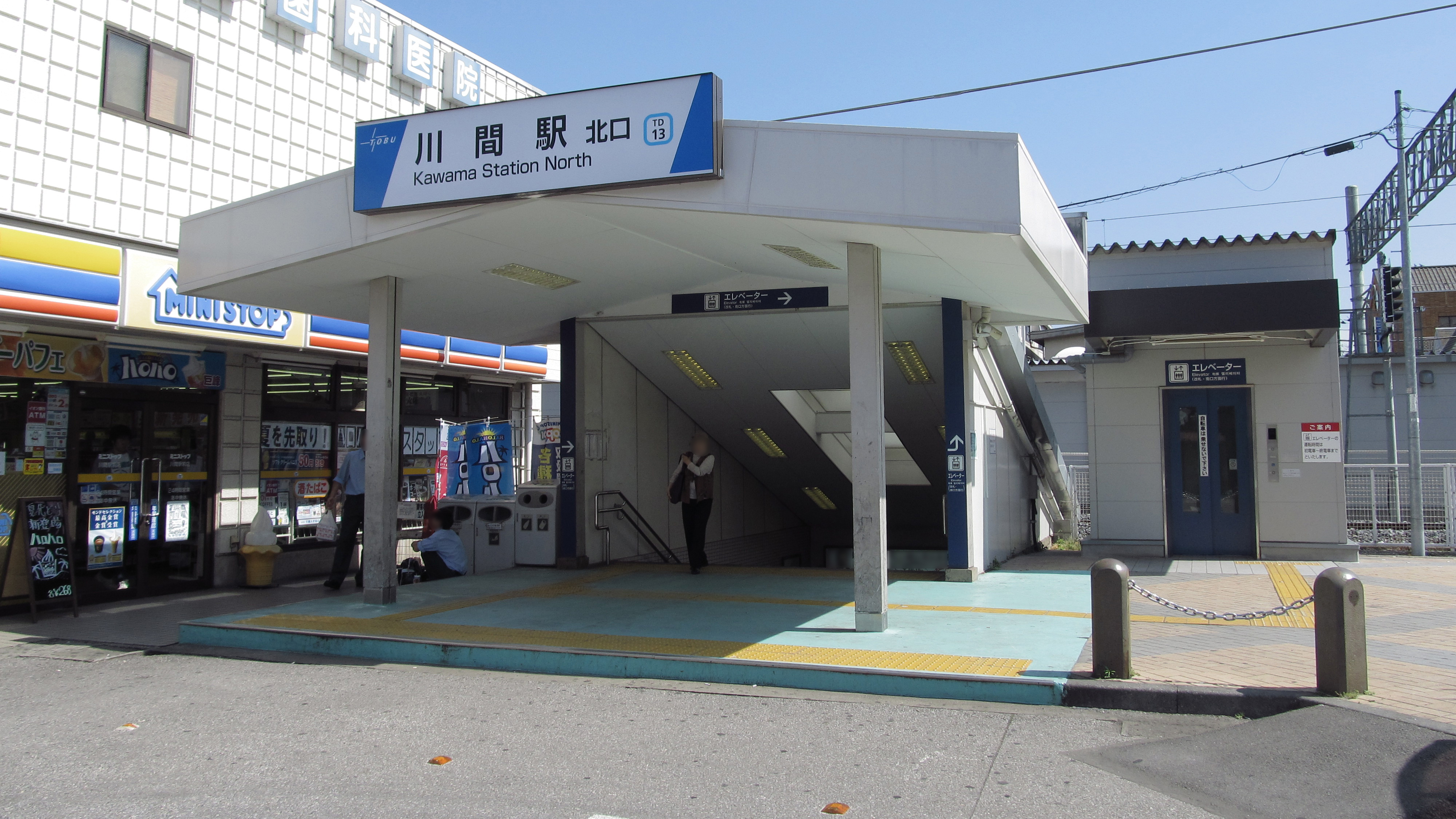
The north entrance in May 2013

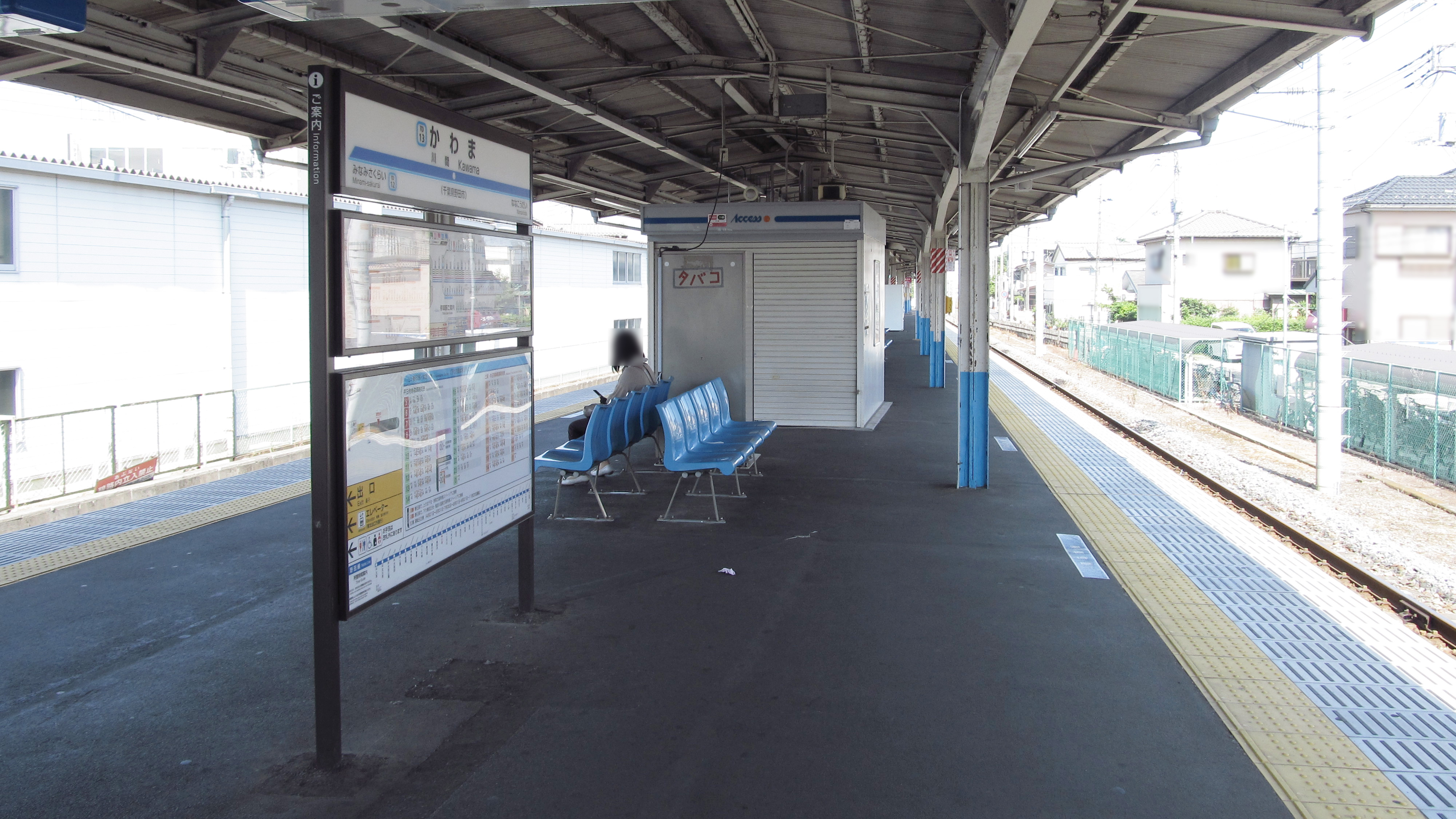
The station platform in May 2013

== History ==
Kawama Station opened on October 1, 1930.

From 17 March 2012, station numbering was introduced on the Tobu Noda Line, with Kiwama Station becoming "TD-13".

From 1 April 2014, the Tobu Noda Line was rebranded the Tobu Urban Park Line (東武アーバンパークライン).

== Passenger statistics ==
In fiscal 2018, the station was used by an average of 17,328 passengers daily. The passenger figures for previous years are as shown below.

Fiscal year	Daily average
2010	18,247
2011	18,058
2012	18,067
2013	17,982
2014	17,322
2015	17,310

== Surrounding area ==
- Kiwama Post Office
- Nodashi Mame Bus
- Asahi Bus
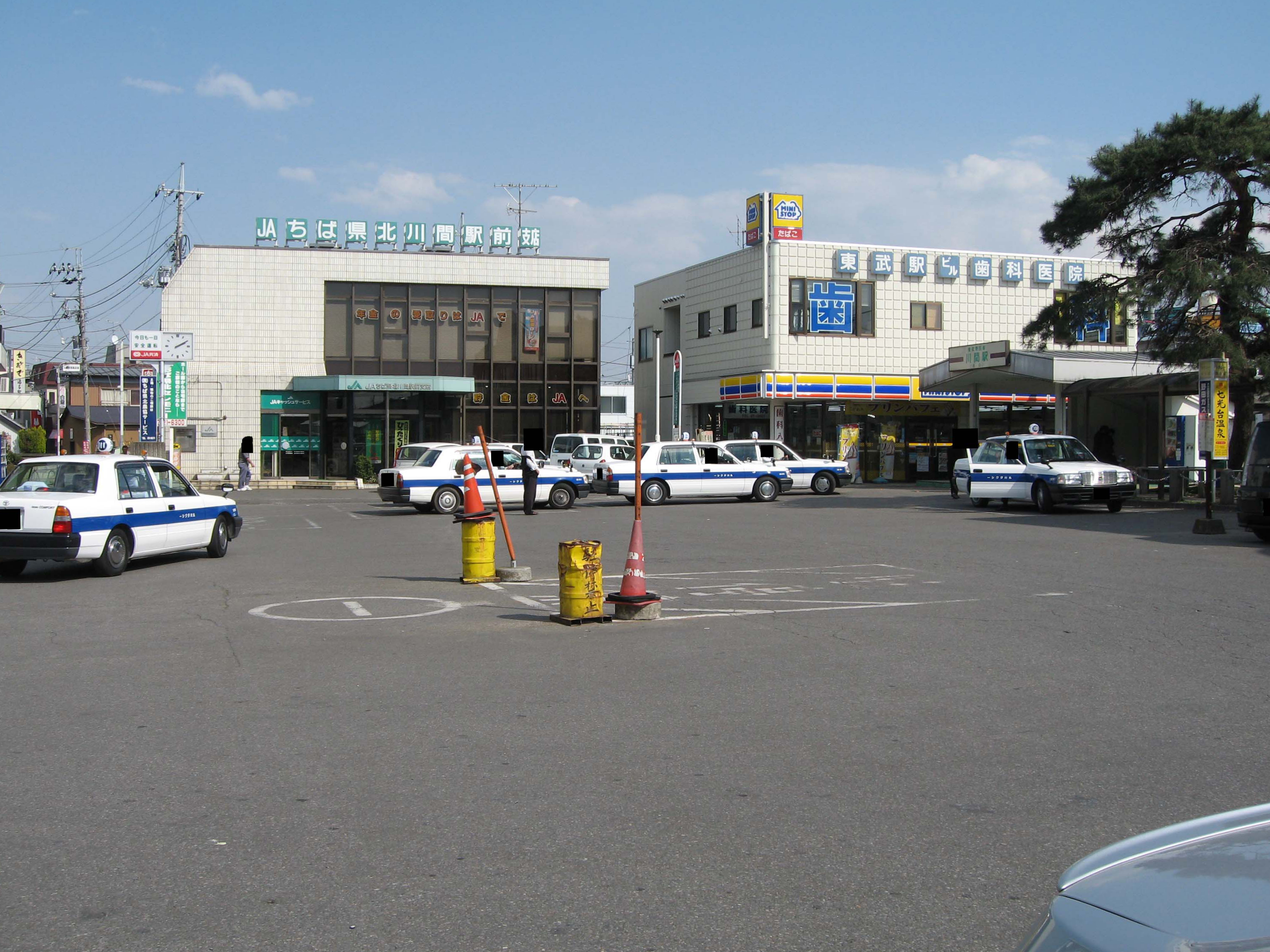
The station forecourt on the north side in March 2007

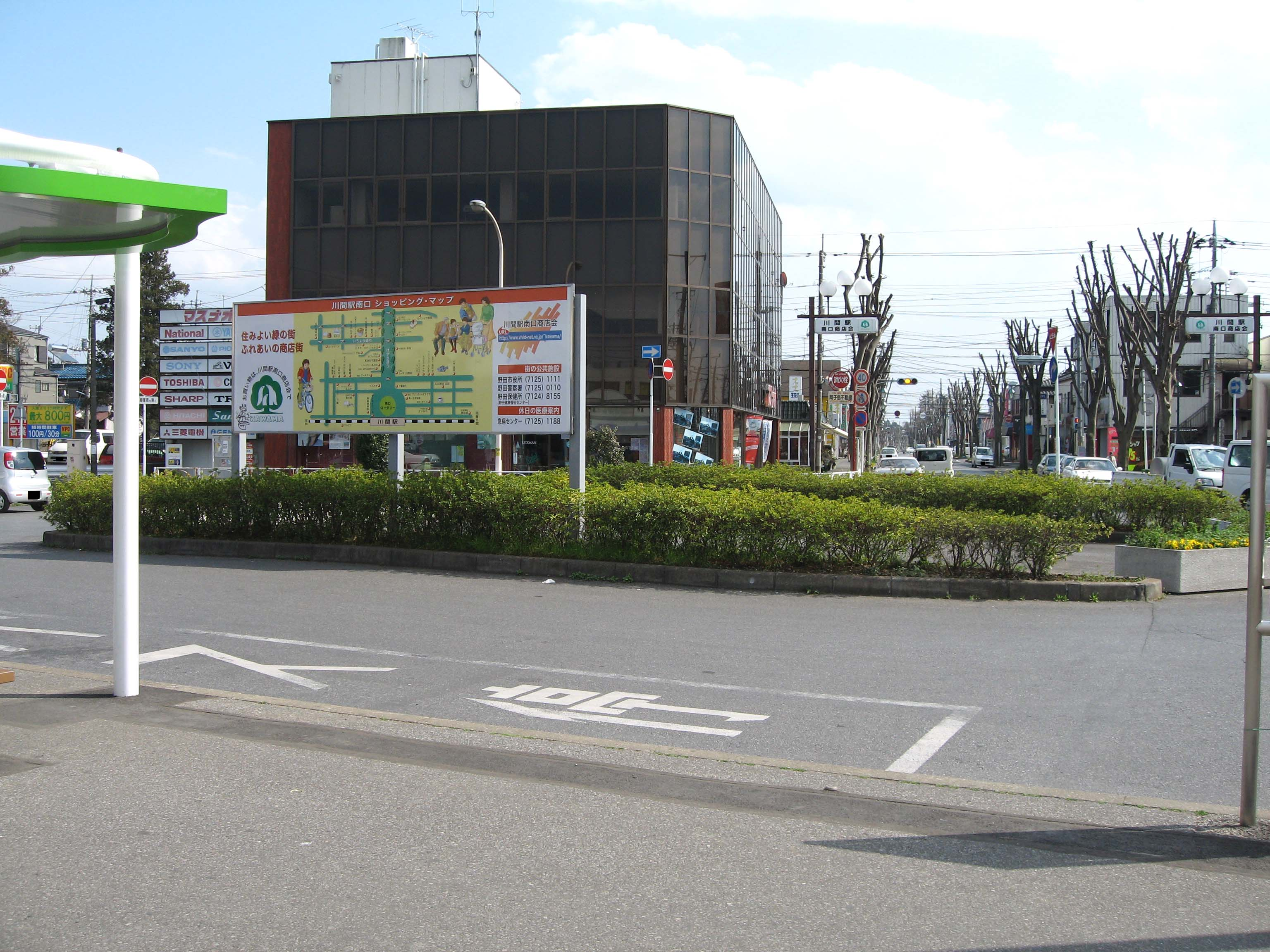
The south side of the station in March 2007

== See also ==
- List of railway stations in Japan
