= Noda, Chiba =

Noda 野田市
- City
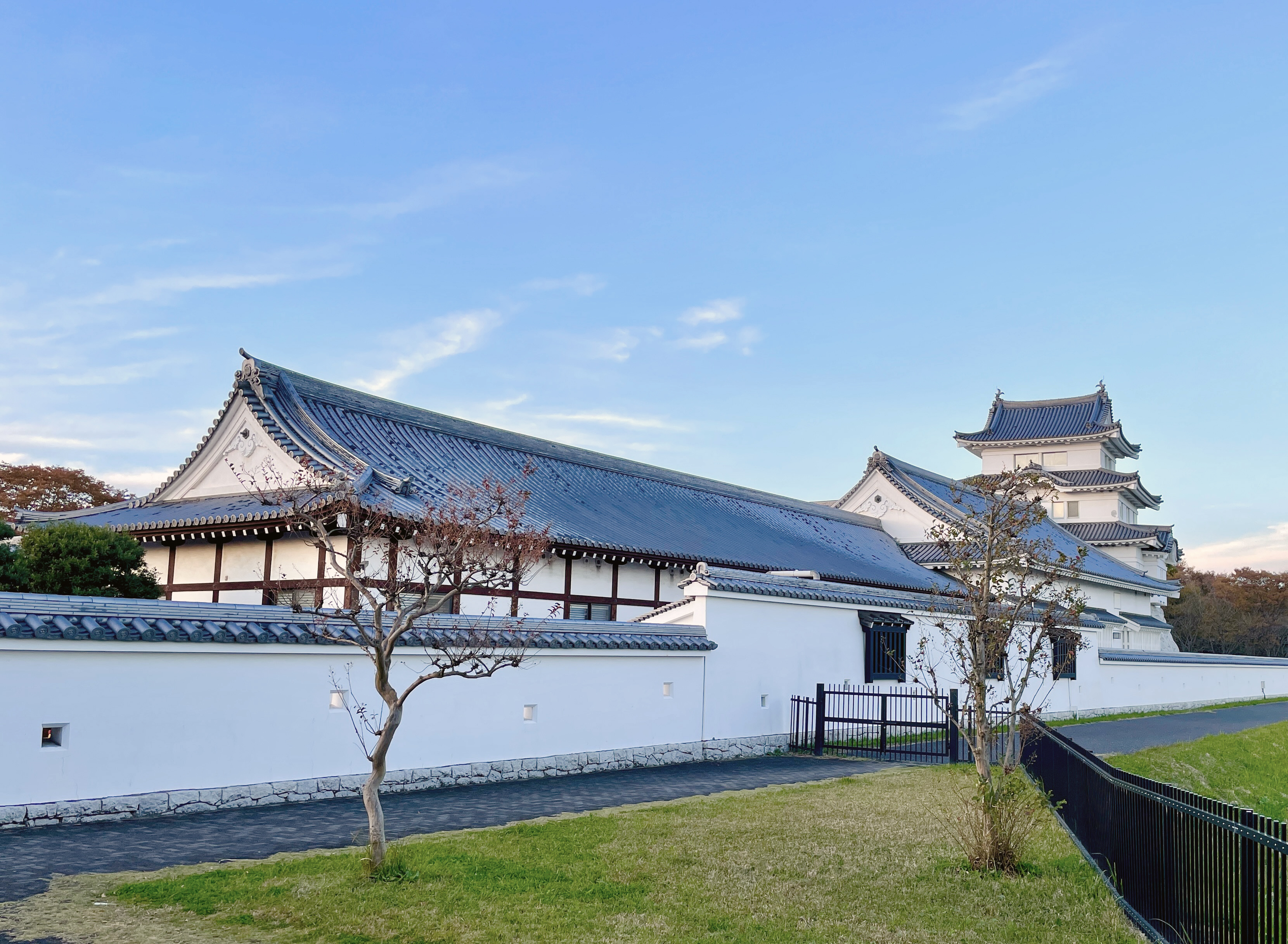
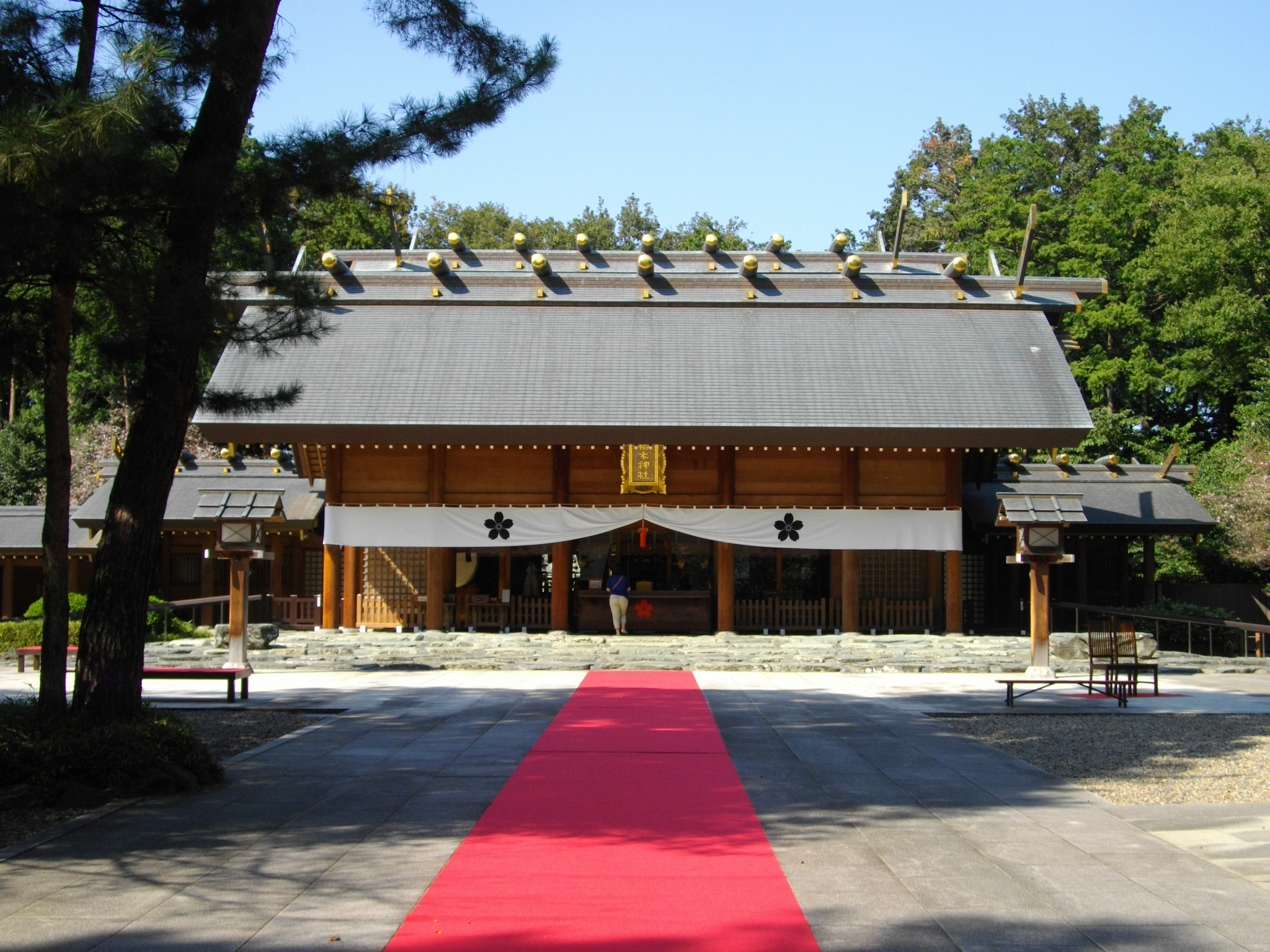
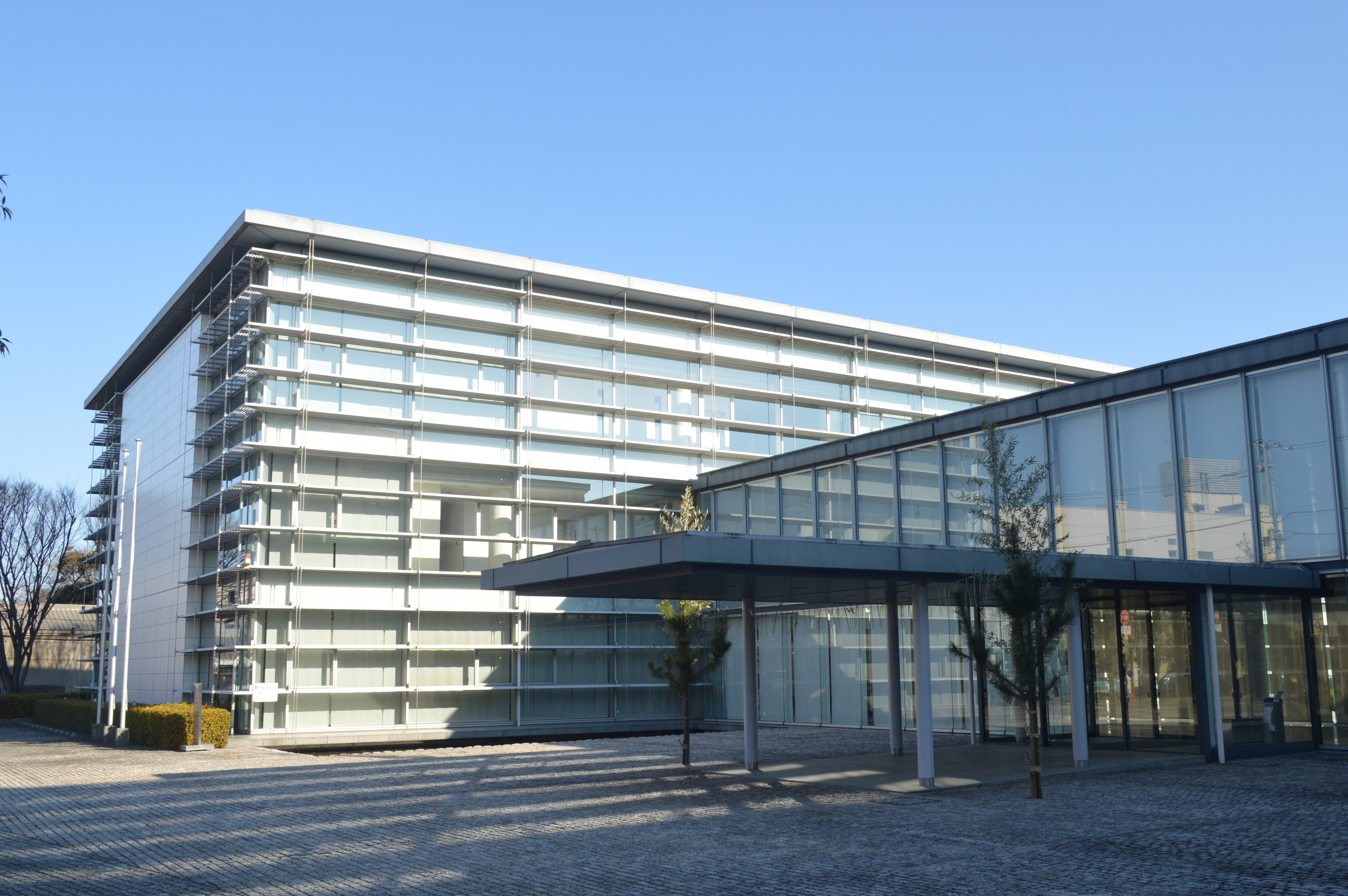
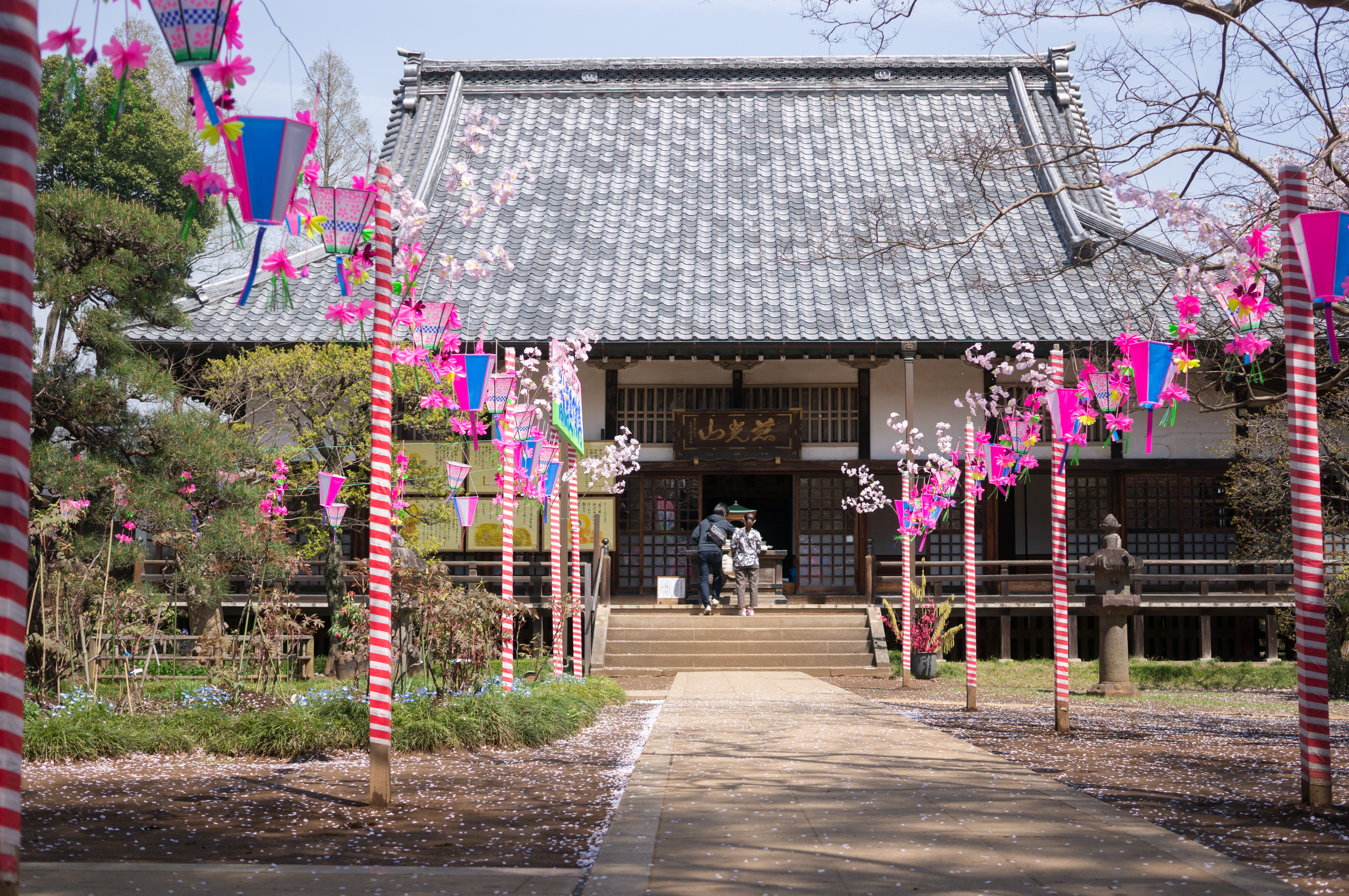
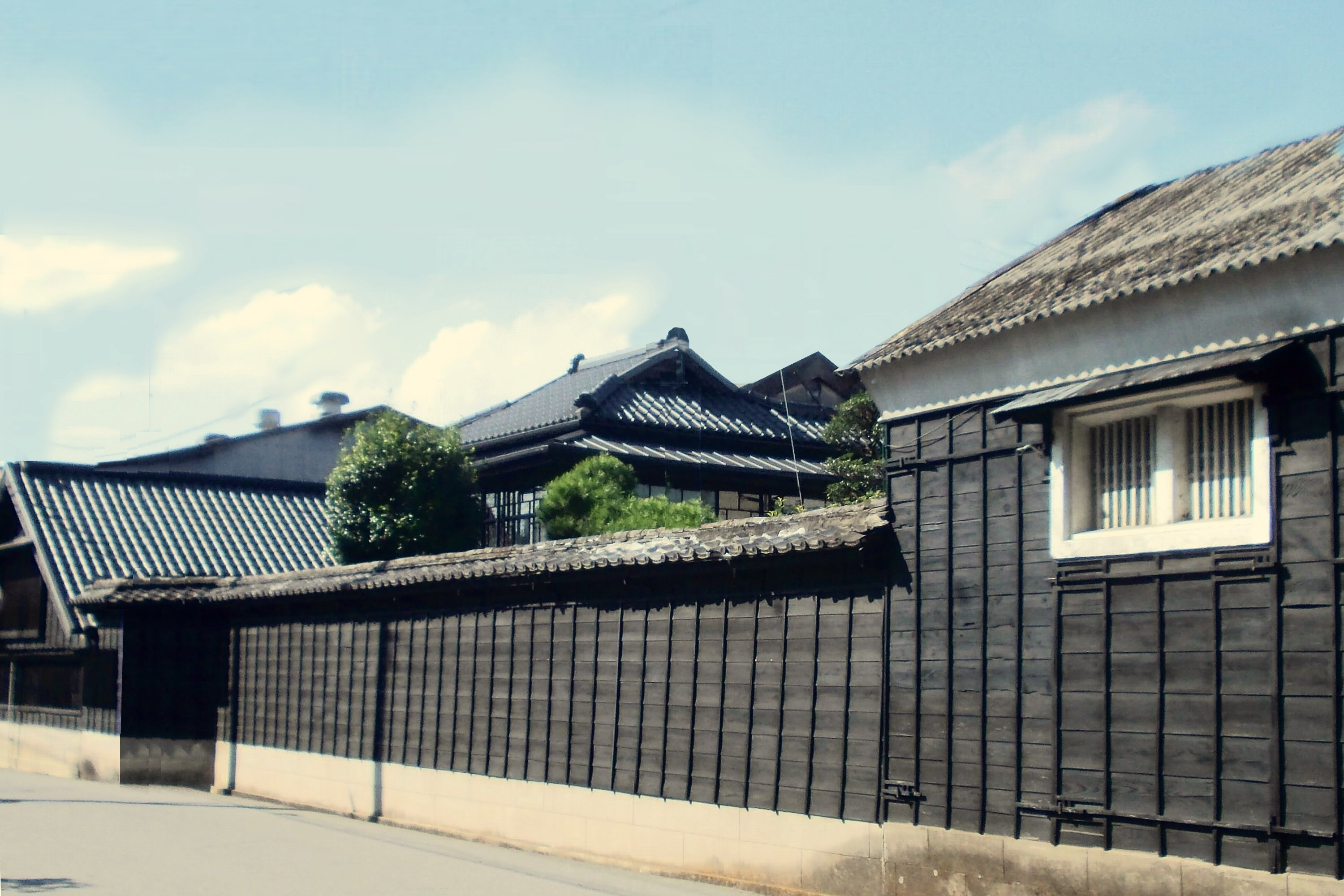
- Sekiyado Castle Sakuragi Jinja Kikkoman headquarter Shimizu Park Kinoene Soy Sauce head office

- Flag

- Location of Noda in Chiba Prefecture

- Coordinates: 35°57′N 139°52′E
- Country: Japan
- Region: Kantō
- Prefecture: Chiba

Government
  - Mayor: Yu Suzuki (since July 2016)

Area
  - Total: 103.54 km^{2} (39.98 sq mi)

Population (December 2020)
  - Total: 154,114
  - Density: 1,488.4/km^{2} (3,855.1/sq mi)
- Time zone: UTC+9 (Japan Standard Time)
- -Tree: Japanese zelkova
- Flower: Azalea
- Bird: Skylark
- Phone number: 04-7125-1111
- Address: 7-1 Tsuruhō, Noda-shi, Chiba-ken 278-8550
- Website: Official website

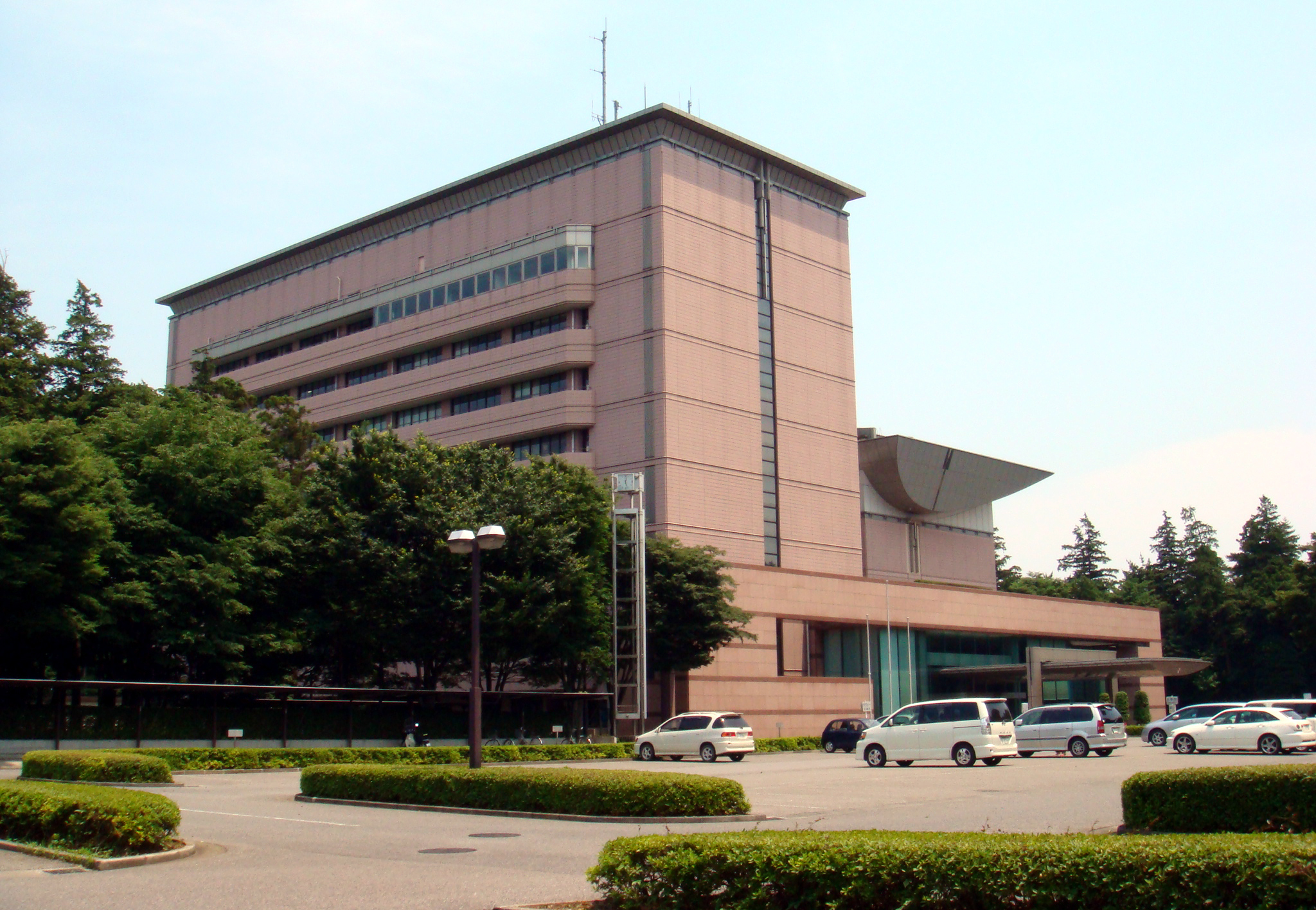
Noda City Hall

Noda (野田市, Noda-shi) is a city located in the northwestern corner of Chiba Prefecture, Japan. As of 1 December 2020, the city had an estimated population of 154,114 in 69,191 households and a population density of 1500 persons per km^{2}. The total area of the city is 103.54 square kilometres (39.98 sq mi). The city is famous for its production of soy sauce.

== Geography ==
Noda is the northernmost city in Chiba Prefecture, and the 36th parallel north passes through it. It is about 40 kilometers from the prefectural capital at Chiba, and 30 to 40 kilometers from central Tokyo. The city center is surrounded by rivers on three sides, with the Shimōsa Plateau, the Tone River to the east of the city, the Edo River to the west, and the Tone Canal to the south. Ibaraki Prefecture is on the opposite bank across the Tone River, and Saitama Prefecture is on the opposite bank across the Edo River.

=== Neighboring municipalities ===
- Chiba Prefecture
  - Kashiwa
  - Nagareyama
- Ibaraki Prefecture
  - Bandō
  - Jōsō
  - Goka
  - Moriya
  - Sakai
- Saitama Prefecture
  - Kasukabe
  - Matsubushi
  - Satte
  - Sugito
  - Yoshikawa

=== Climate ===
Noda has a humid subtropical climate (Köppen Cfa) characterized by warm summers and cool winters with light to no snowfall. The average annual temperature in Noda is 14.6 °C. The average annual rainfall is 1351 mm with September as the wettest month. The temperatures are highest on average in August, at around 26.6 °C, and lowest in January, at around 3.7 °C.

== Demographics ==
Per Japanese census data, the population of Noda has recently plateaued after a long period of growth.

Historical population
| Year | Pop. | ±% |
|---|---|---|
| 1920 | 40,869 | — |
| 1930 | 49,846 | +22.0% |
| 1940 | 51,316 | +2.9% |
| 1950 | 65,294 | +27.2% |
| 1960 | 66,909 | +2.5% |
| 1970 | 80,520 | +20.3% |
| 1980 | 112,753 | +40.0% |
| 1990 | 145,206 | +28.8% |
| 2000 | 151,197 | +4.1% |
| 2010 | 155,491 | +2.8% |
| 2020 | 152,638 | −1.8% |

== History ==
The area around Noda has been inhabited since prehistory, and archaeologists have found ancient shell middens in the area. During the late Heian period, the area was controlled by Kamakura Gongorō Kagemasa, and a succession of minor warlords during the Sengoku period. During the Edo period, Noda developed as a river port, post town on the pilgrimage road to Nikko, and a center for the production of soy sauce. Neighboring Sekiyado was controlled by the Later Hōjō clan during the Sengoku period, and developed as a castle town under Sekiyado Domain, a feudal han under the Tokugawa shogunate.

After the Meiji Restoration, Noda and Sekiyado towns were created on April 1, 1889 with the establishment of the modern municipalities system. Noda was elevated to city status on May 3, 1950.

Noda is where the Fukuda Village Incident took place in September, 1923, after the 1923 Great Kantō earthquake.

On June 6, 2003, the town of Sekiyado (from Higashikatsushika District) was merged into Noda.

== Government ==
Noda has a mayor-council form of government with a directly elected mayor and a unicameral city council of 28 members. Noda contributes two members to the Chiba Prefectural Assembly. In terms of national politics, the city is part of Chiba 7th district of the lower house of the Diet of Japan.

== Economy ==
Noda is a regional commercial center and, due to its proximity, a bedroom community for nearby Chiba and Tokyo, with 13% of the population commuting daily to Tokyo per the 2010 census. Noda has a mixed economy, with Kikkoman soy sauce being the most prominent employer. The city has several industrial parks. There is some residual agriculture, primarily of edamame, for which Noda was historically famous.

== Education ==
- Tokyo University of Science – Noda Campus
- Chiba University of Commerce
- Noda has 20 public elementary schools and 11 public middle schools operated by the city government, and three public high schools operated by the Chiba Prefectural Board of Education. The prefecture also operates one special education school for the handicapped. There are also one private middle school and two private high schools.

== Transportation ==
=== Railway ===
Tōbu Railway - Tōbu Noda Line

- Kawama - Nanakōdai - Shimizu-kōen - Atago - Nodashi - Umesato

=== Highways ===
- National Route 16

== Local attractions ==
- Kantarō Suzuki Memorial Museum
- Sakuragi Jinja
- Sekiyado Castle

== Sister cities ==
- Whakatāne, Bay of Plenty Region, New Zealand, since November 16, 1997.

== Notable people from Noda ==
- Kyōko Aizome, AV actress and movie director
- Dabo, Japanese rap musician
- Masaaki Hatsumi, martial arts instructor
- Kiyoshi Kimura, Tuna King and head of Kiyomura Corporation
- Mai Oshima, idol singer
- Takahiro Oshima, professional soccer player
- Katsumasa Uchida, actor
