= List of culinary fruits =

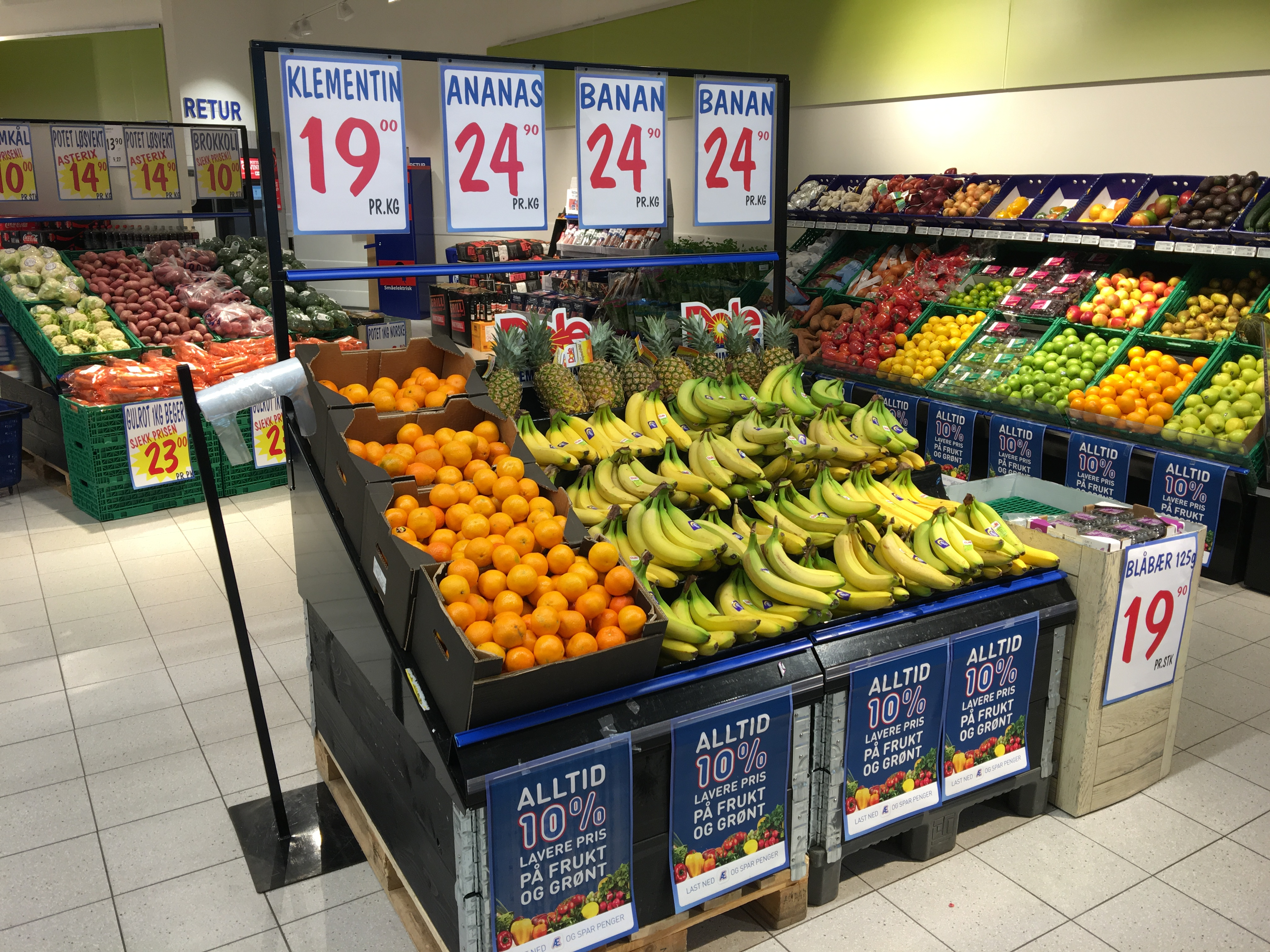
Various fruits for sale at REMA 1000 grocery store in Tønsberg, Norway

This list contains the names of fruits that are considered edible either raw or cooked in various cuisines. The word fruit is used in several different ways. The definition of fruit for this list is a culinary fruit, defined as "Any edible and palatable part of a plant that resembles fruit, even if it does not develop from a floral ovary; also used in a technically imprecise sense for some sweet or semi-sweet vegetables, some of which may resemble a true fruit or are used in cookery as if they were a fruit, for example rhubarb." (Note: See the Wiktionary definition of fruit)

Many edible plant parts that are considered fruits in the botanical sense are culinarily classified as vegetables (for example, tomatoes, zucchini), and thus do not appear on this list. Similarly, some botanical fruits are classified as nuts (e.g. Brazil nut) and do not appear here either.

== Pomes ==
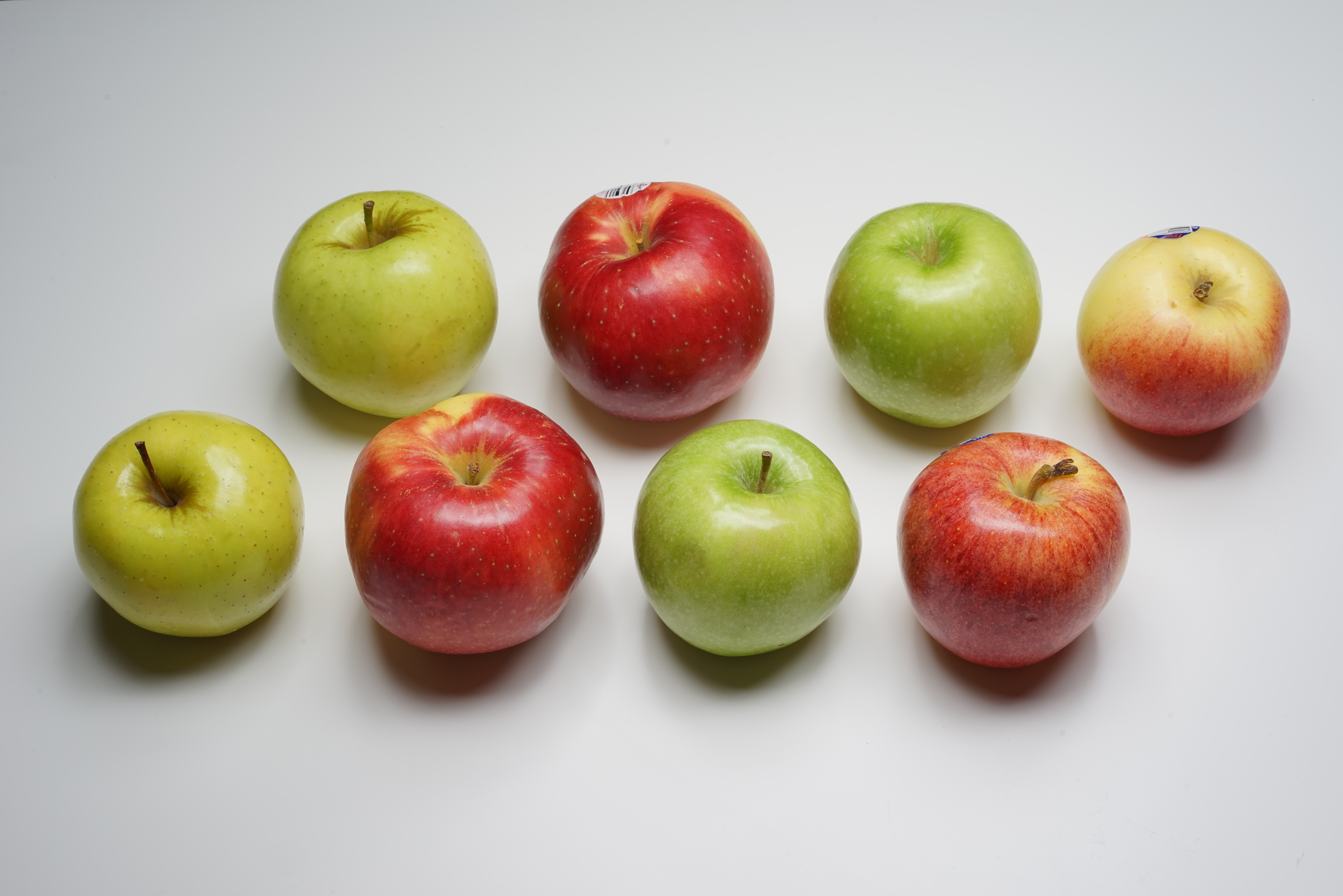
From left to right: Golden Delicious, SweeTango, Granny Smith, and Gala apples.

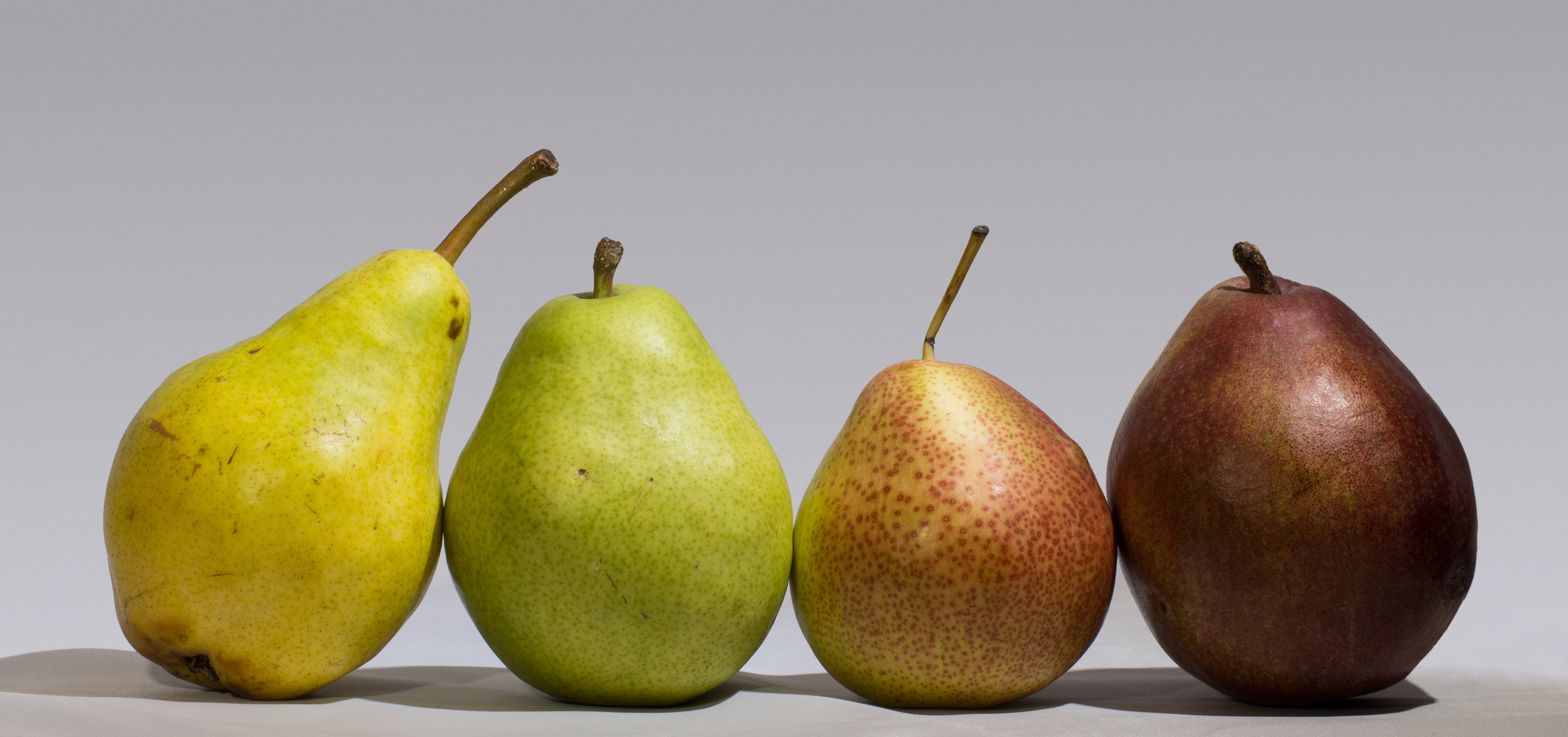
From left to right: green Bartlett, D'Anjou, Forelle, and red Bartlett pears.

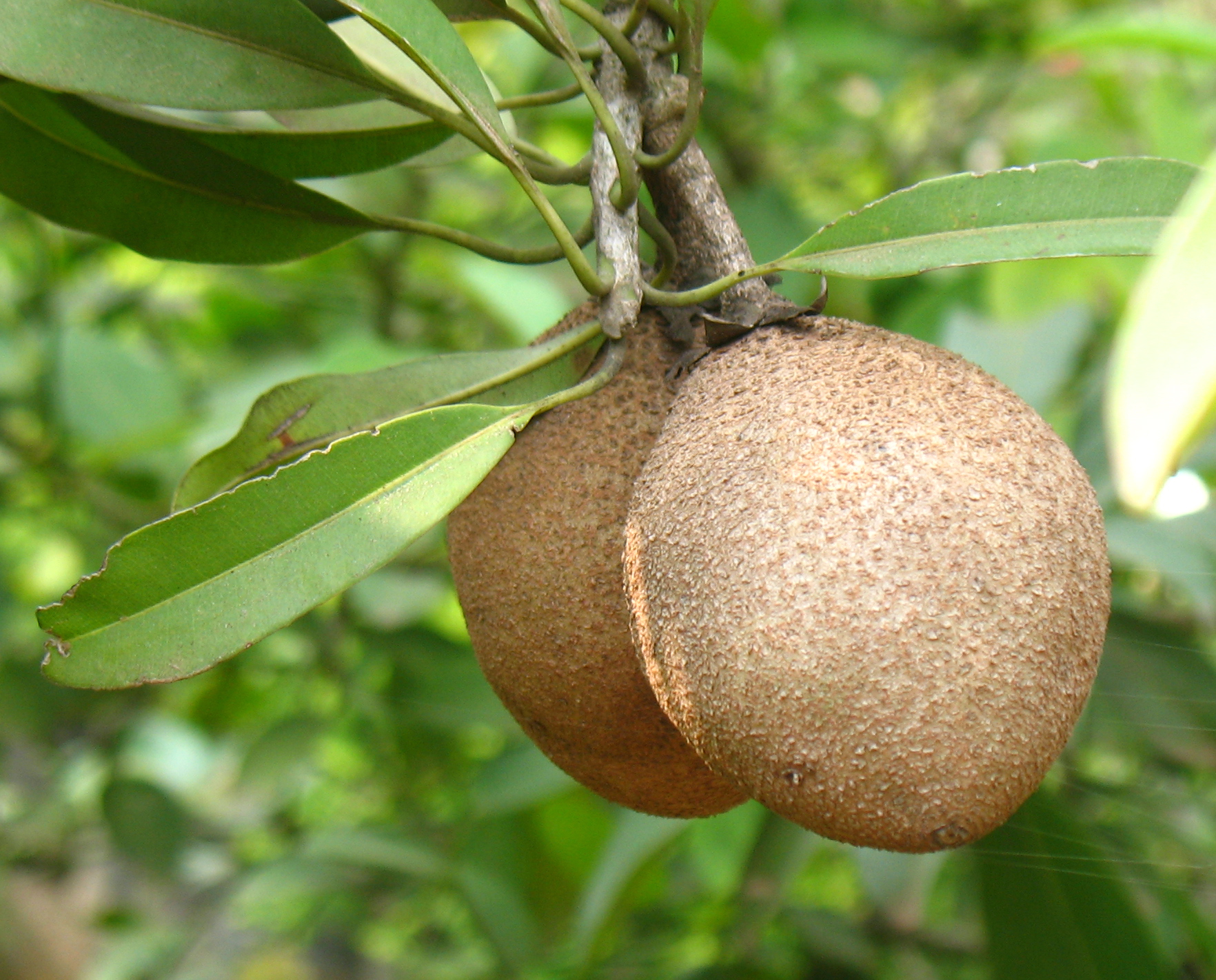
Sapodilla fruits

Pomes include any crunchy accessory fruit that surrounds the fruit's inedible "core" (composed of the plant's endocarp) and typically has its seeds arranged in a star-like pattern.

Common name	Species name
African pear	Manilkara obovata
Almond-leaved pear	Pyrus spinosa
Altai apple	Malus sieversii
Amelanchier parviflora	Amelanchier parviflora
Apple	Malus domestica
Apricot-leaved pear	Pyrus armeniacifolia
Asian pear	Pyrus pyrifolia
Balatá	Manilkara bidentata
Birchleaf pear	Pyrus betulifolia
Bronze loquat	Eriobotrya deflexa
Callery pear	Pyrus calleryana
Calva crabapple	Malus kansuensis
Canadian serviceberry	Amelanchier canadensis
Caqui	Manilkara kauki
Cerrado pear	Eugenia klotzschiana
Chicle	Manilkara chicle
Chinese crab apple	Malus hupehensis
Chinese flowering apple	Malus spectabilis
Chinese pearleaf crabapple	Malus asiatica
Chinese quince	Pseudocydonia sinensis
Chinese serviceberry	Amelanchier sinica
Chinese white pear	Pyrus × bretschneideri
Chokeberry	Aronia melanocarpa
Coastal serviceberry	Amelanchier obovalis
Cocky apple	Planchonia careya
Cow tree fruit	Manilkara elata
Downy serviceberry	Amelanchier arborea
Dusky pear	Pyrus phaeocarpa
Eastern crabapple	Malus orientalis
Eastern mayhaw	Crataegus aestivalis
European crab apple	Malus sylvestris
European wild pear	Pyrus pyraster
Florentine crabapple	Malus florentina
Greene's mountain-ash fruit	Sorbus scopulina
Hall crabapple	Malus halliana
Hawthorn	Crataegus rhipidophylla
Indian wild pear	Pyrus pashia
Intermediate serviceberry	Amelanchier intermedia
Jagua	Genipa americana
Japanese crab	Malus floribunda
Juneberry	Amelanchier lamarckii
Kaido crab apple	Malus × kaido
Kazak pear	Pyrus korshinskyi
Khirni	Manilkara hexandra
Korean juneberry	Amelanchier asiatica
Lebanese wild apple	Malus trilobata
Loquat	Eriobotrya japonica
Lovi-lovi	Flacourtia inermis
Low juneberry	Amelanchier spicata
Low serviceberry	Amelanchier humilis
Manchurian crab apple	Malus mandshurica
Massaranduba	Manilkara bella
Medlar	Mespilus germanica
Mountain serviceberry	Amelanchier bartramiana
Nantucket serviceberry	Amelanchier nantucketensis
Niedzwetzky's apple	Malus niedzwetzkyana
Nokaidō	Malus spontanea
Oleaster-leafed pear	Pyrus elaeagrifolia
Pacific crabapple	Malus fusca
Pale serviceberry	Amelanchier pallida
Pear	Pyrus communis
Pillar apple	Malus tschonoskii
Plumleaf crab apple	Malus prunifolia
Plymouth pear	Pyrus cordata
Prairie crabapple	Malus ioensis
Pratt's crabapple	Malus prattii
Pyrus glabra	Pyrus glabra
Quince	Cydonia oblonga
Ramontchi	Flacourtia indica
Red-checked crab apple	Malus toringoides
Regel pear	Pyrus regelii
Roundleaf serviceberry	Amelanchier sanguinea
Rowan	Sorbus aucuparia
Sapodilla	Manilkara zapota
Sargent crabapple	Malus sargentii
Saskatoon	Amelanchier alnifolia
Scarlet firethorn	Pyracantha coccinea
Shipova	× Pyraria irregularis
Shrub apple	Malus brevipes
Siberian crab apple	Malus baccata
Sikkim crabapple	Malus sikkimensis
Small-fruited crab apple	Malus transitoria
Smooth serviceberry	Amelanchier laevis
Snow pear	Pyrus nivalis
Snowy mespilus	Amelanchier ovalis
Sorb	Sorbus domestica
Southern crabapple	Malus angustifolia
Sweet crabapple	Malus coronaria
Syrian pear	Pyrus syriaca
Taiwan crabapple	Malus doumeri
Taiwanese rowan	Sorbus randaiensis
Toringo crabapple	Malus toringo
Toyon	Heteromeles arbutifolia
Ussurian pear	Pyrus ussuriensis
Utah serviceberry	Amelanchier utahensis
Vilmorin's rowan	Sorbus vilmorinii
Whitebeam fruit	Aria edulis
Wiegand's serviceberry	Amelanchier interior
Wild dilly	Manilkara jaimiqui
Wild service tree fruit	Sorbus torminalis
Wood pear	Pyrus xerophila
Yunnan crabapple	Malus yunnanensis
Zumi crabapple	Malus × zumi

== Drupes ==
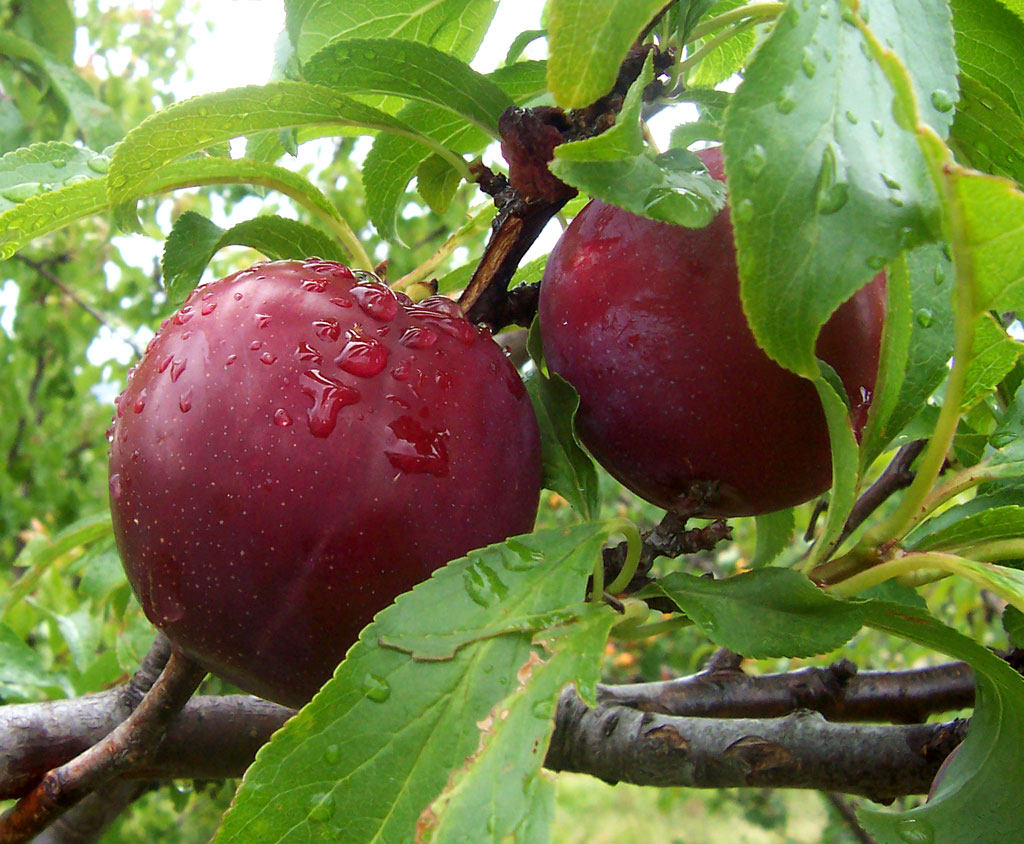
Plums

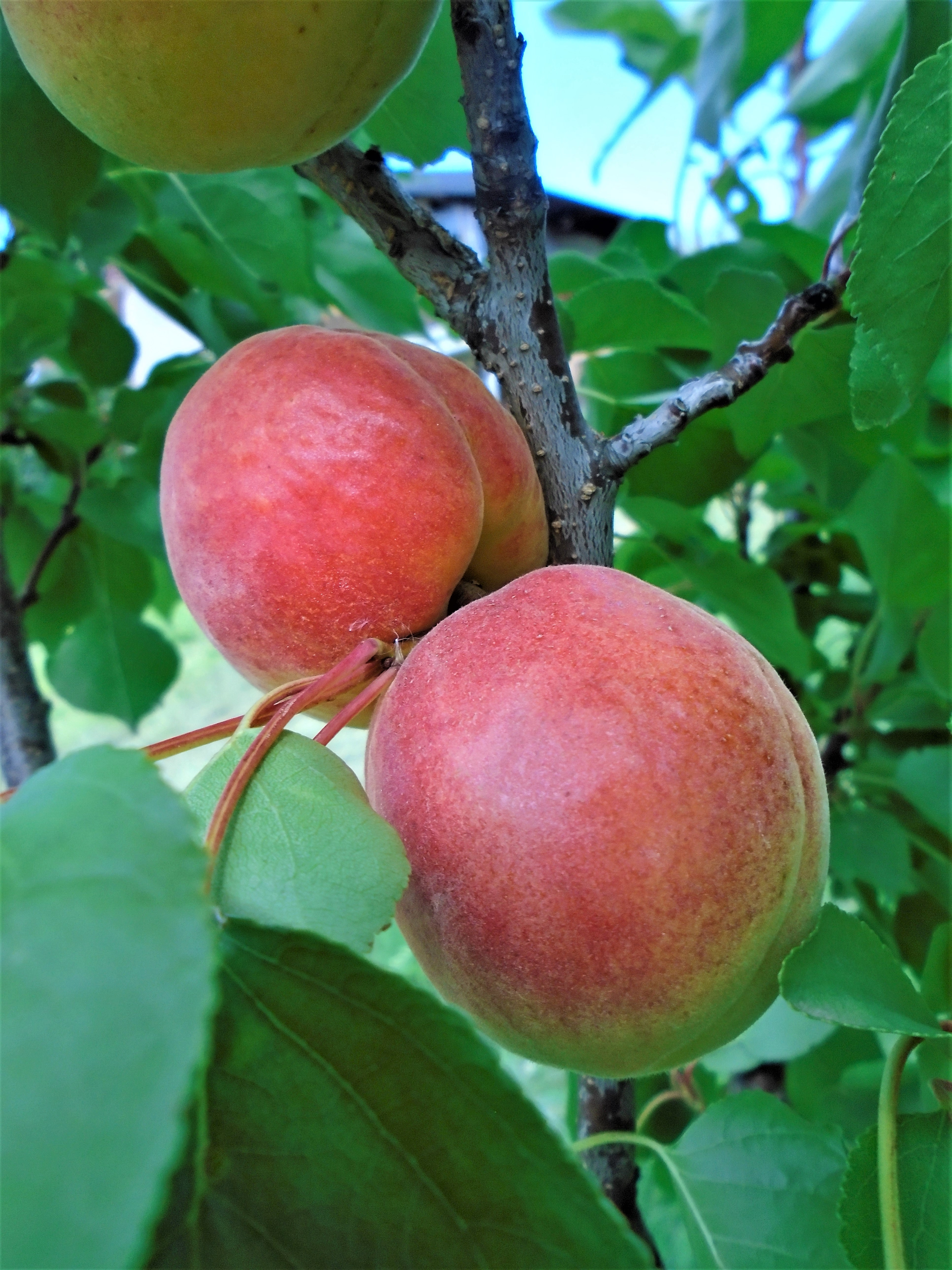
Apricots

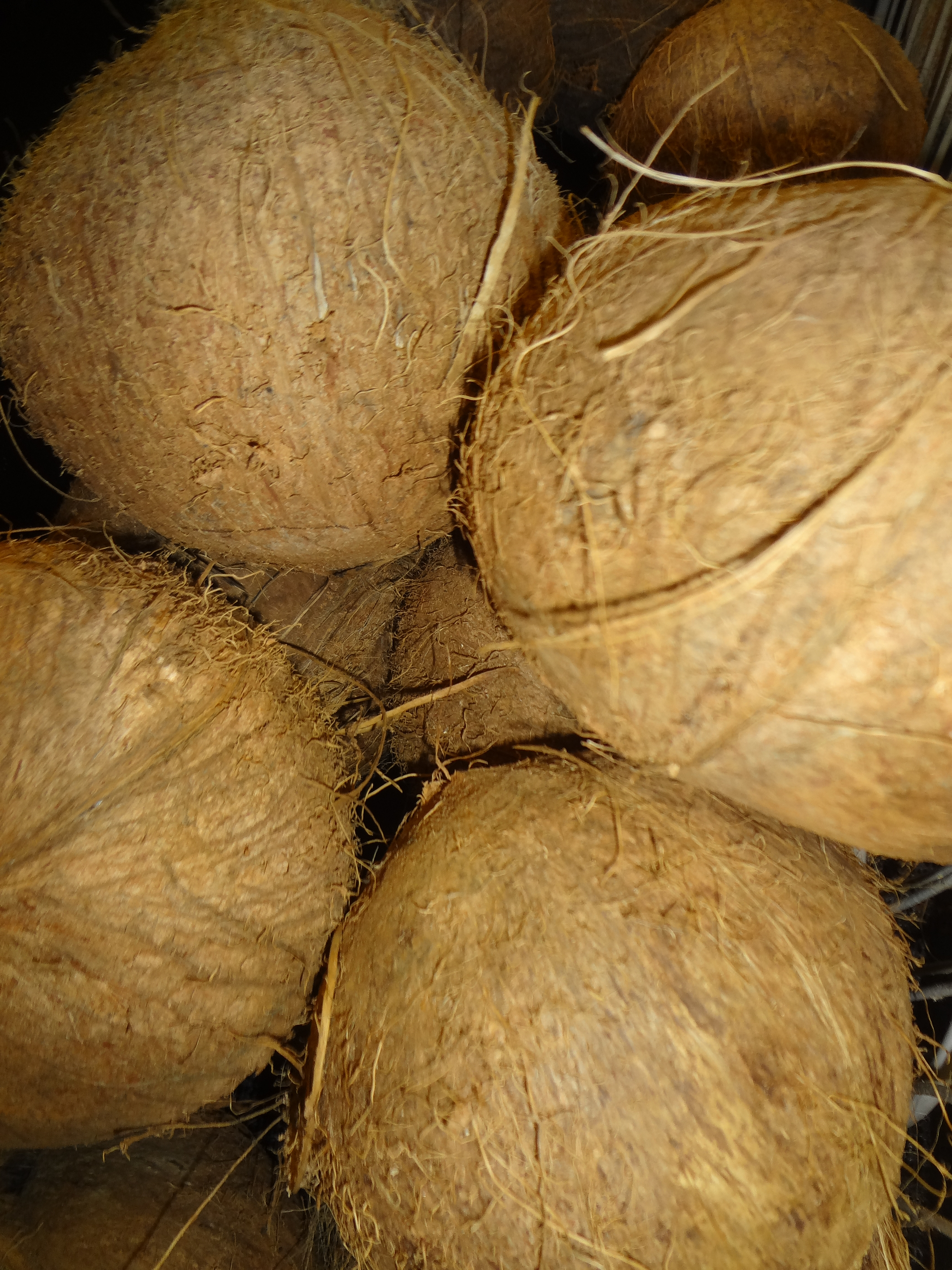
The coconut is a drupe.

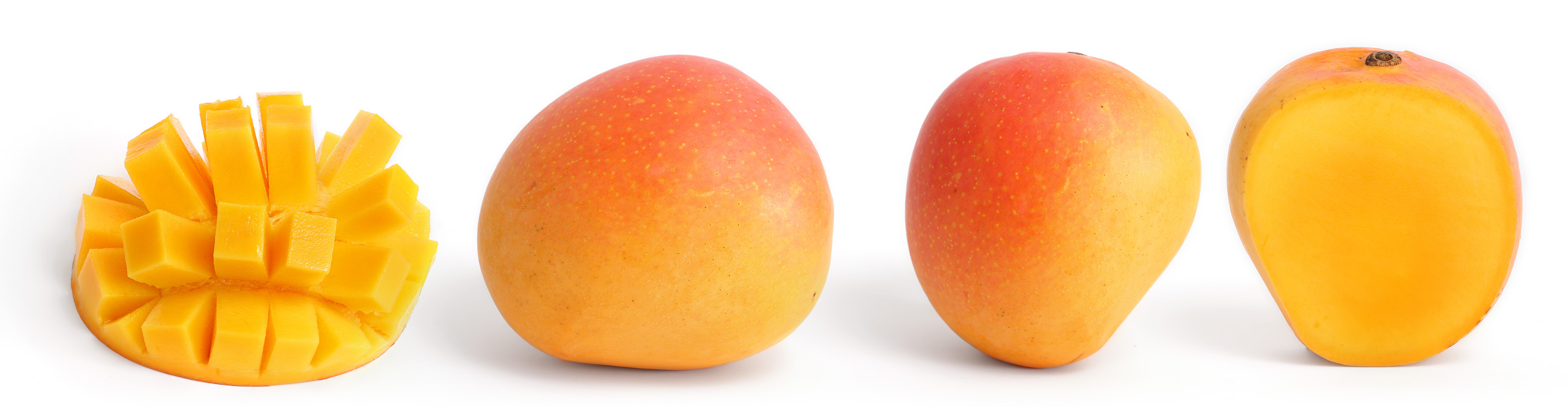
Ways to slice a mango

Drupes represent any fruit that has only one seed (or "stone") or one hard capsule containing seeds.

Common name	Species name
Açaí	Euterpe oleracea
Acerola	Malpighia emarginata
Afghan cherry	Prunus jacquemontii
African mango	Irvingia gabonensis
African mangosteen	Garcinia livingstonei
African oil palm fruit	Elaeis guineensis
Aguasiqui	Prunus gentryi
Alaskan bunchberry	Cornus × unalaschkensis
Allegheny plum	Prunus alleghaniensis
Almond	Prunus amygdalus
Amazon grape	Pourouma cecropiifolia
Ambarella	Spondias dulcis
American oil palm fruit	Elaeis oleifera
American plum	Prunus americana
Apricot	Prunus armeniaca
Apricot plum	Prunus simonii
Arabian wild almond	Prunus arabica
Arnott's mountain black plum	Syzygium densiflorum
Assyrian plum	Cordia myxa
Atoto	Syzygium thompsonii
Avocado	Persea americana
Bambangan	Mangifera pajang
Beach butia	Butia catarinensis
Beach plum	Prunus maritima
Bear's plum	Prunus ursina
Beccari	Butia capitata
Ber	Ziziphus nummularia
Bignay	Antidesma bunius
Binjai	Mangifera caesia
Bird cherry	Prunus padus
Black cherry	Prunus serotina
Black plum	Prunus nigra
Blue guarri	Euclea crispa
Blue lilly pilly	Syzygium oleosum
Bokhara plum	Prunus bokhariensis
Bolivian mountain coconut	Parajubaea torallyi
Boquierinho	Butia arenicola
Borneo olive	Canarium odontophyllum
Briançon apricot	Prunus brigantina
Broad-leaved lilly pilly fruit	Syzygium hemilamprum
Broom jelly palm fruit	Butia pubispatha
Brush cherry	Syzygium australe
Buffalo-thorn	Ziziphus mucronata
Burdekin plum	Pleiogynium timoriense
Bush butter fruit	Dacryodes edulis
Yata'i kapi'i	Butia campicola
Butia matogrossensis	Butia matogrossensis
Cabeçudo	Butia purpurascens
Calligonum junceum	Calligonum junceum
Canadian bunchberry	Cornus canadensis
Casimiroa	Casimiroa edulis
Cedar Bay cherry	Eugenia reinwardtiana
Changunga	Byrsonima crassifolia
Cherry elaeagnus	Elaeagnus multiflora
Cherry laurel	Prunus laurocerasus
Cherry of the Rio Grande	Eugenia involucrata
Cherry plum	Prunus cerasifera
Chickasaw plum	Prunus angustifolia
Chinese bush cherry	Prunus glandulosa
Chinese date	Ziziphus mauritiana
Chinese olive	Canarium album
Chinese plum	Prunus salicina
Chinese sour cherry	Prunus pseudocerasus
Choke cherry	Prunus virginiana
Chupón	Pouteria amygdalicarpa
Clove cherry	Prunus apetala
Coarse dodder-laurel fruit	Cassytha melantha
Coconut	Cocos nucifera
Cocoplum	Chrysobalanus icaco
Coffeeberry	Frangula californica
Cone cherry	Prunus conadenia
Coolamon	Syzygium moorei
Cornelian cherry	Cornus mas
Corozo palm fruit	Bactris guineensis
Country-almond	Terminalia catappa
Creek plum	Prunus rivularis
Crowberry	Empetrum nigrum
Curry berry	Murraya koenigii
Cyclamin cherry	Prunus cyclamina
Damba	Syzygium nervosum
Damson	Prunus domestica subsp. insititia
Darvaz plum	Prunus darvasica
Date	Phoenix dactylifera
David's peach	Prunus davidiana
Dawyck cherry	Prunus × dawyckensis
Desert almond	Prunus fasciculata
Desert apricot	Prunus fremontii
Desert peach	Prunus andersonii
Desert quandong	Santalum acuminatum
Dhung	Syzygium caryophyllatum
Dog cherry	Prunus buergeriana
Dwarf butia	Butia lallemantii
Dwarf jelly palm fruit	Butia archeri
Dwarf Russian almond	Prunus tenella
Dwarf yatay palm fruit	Butia paraguayensis
Emblic	Phyllanthus emblica
Emu apple	Owenia acidula
Engkala	Litsea garciae
European dwarf cherry	Prunus fruticosa
European plum	Prunus domestica
Fenzl's almond	Prunus fenzliana
Fergana peach	Prunus ferganensis
Fibrous satinash fruit	Syzygium fibrosum
Flatwoods plum	Prunus umbellata
Flowering almond	Prunus triloba
Fuji cherry	Prunus incisa
Gandaria	Bouea macrophylla
Gansu peach	Prunus kansuensis
Gomortega	Gomortega keule
Gowok	Syzygium polycephalum
Gray-leaf cherry	Prunus canescens
Greengage	Prunus domestica subsp. italica
Green plum	Buchanania obovata
Grey satinash fruit	Syzygium claviflorum
Grugru palm fruit	Acrocomia aculeata
Guavaberry	Myrciaria floribunda
Guarana	Paullinia cupana
Gubinge	Terminalia ferdinandiana
Guinea sour pod	Dialium guineense
Hackberry	Celtis occidentalis
Hairless rambutan	Nephelium xerospermoides
High-eaves syzygium	Syzygium oblatum
Himalayan bird cherry	Prunus cornuta
Hokkaido bird cherry	Prunus ssiori
Hollyleaf cherry	Prunus ilicifolia
Hortulan plum	Prunus hortulana
Italian plum	Prunus cocomilia
Jackal jujube	Ziziphus oenopolia
Jambolan	Syzygium cumini
Japanese alpine cherry	Prunus nipponica
Japanese apricot	Prunus mume
Japanese bird cherry	Prunus grayana
Japanese bush cherry	Prunus japonica
Japanese cherry	Prunus serrulata
Japanese silverberry	Elaeagnus umbellata
Jelly palm fruit	Butia odortata
Jocote	Spondias purpurea
Johnstone River satinash fruit	Syzygium erythrocalyx
Jujube	Ziziphus jujuba
Kaong	Arenga pinnata
Kelsey plum	Prunus salicina spp.
King coconut	Cocos nucifera var. aurantiaca
Lipote	Syzygium curranii
Lipote	Syzygium polycephaloides
Korlan	Nephelium hypoleucum
Lala palm	Hyphaene coriacea
Lemonadeberry	Rhus integrifolia
Lemon aspen fruit	Acronychia acidula
Lilly pilly	Syzygium smithii
Little gooseberry	Buchanania arborescens
Lockerbie satinash fruit	Syzygium branderhorstii
Longan	Dimocarpus longan
Long-flowered syzygium	Syzygium cerasiforme
Long-peduncled almond	Prunus pedunculata
Lychee	Litchi chinensis
Magenta lilly pilly	Syzygium paniculatum
Malay rose apple	Syzygium malaccense
Mamey sapote	Pouteria sapota
Manchurian apricot	Prunus mandshurica
Manchurian cherry	Prunus maackii
Mango	Mangifera indica
Mardarrgu	Ziziphus quadrilocularis
Marula	Sclerocarya birrea
Mexican plum	Prunus mexicana
Millaa millaa	Elaeagnus triflora
Miracle fruit	Synsepalum dulcificum
Mistol	Ziziphus mistol
Miyama cherry	Prunus maximowiczii
Moriche palm fruit	Mauritia flexuosa
Muntrie	Kunzea pomifera
Murray's plum	Prunus murrayana
Nance	Byrsonima crassifolia
Nanjing cherry	Prunus tomentosa
Nannyberry	Viburnum lentago
Nectarine	Prunus persica var. nucipersica
Neem	Azadirachta indica
Nepal jujube	Ziziphus incurva
Nepali hog plum	Choerospondias axillaris
Nipa palm fruit	Nypa fruticans
Nutmeg fruit	Myristica fragrans
Oklahoma plum	Prunus gracilis
Olosapo	Couepia polyandra
Oshima cherry	Prunus speciosa
Otaheite gooseberry	Phyllanthus acidus
Pacific plum	Prunus subcordata
Paho mango	Mangifera altissima
Paperbark satinash fruit	Syzygium papyraceum
Partridgeberry	Mitchella repens
Peach	Prunus persica
Peach palm fruit	Bactris gasipaes
Peanut butter fruit	Bunchosia glandulifera
Pequi	Caryocar brasiliense
Phalsa	Grewia asiatica
Pigeon plum	Coccoloba diversifolia
Pili	Canarium ovatum
Pin cherry	Prunus pensylvanica
Pink satinash fruit	Syzygium sayeri
Pitanga	Eugenia uniflora
Pitomba	Talisia esculenta
Prunus alaica	Prunus alaica
Prunus bifrons	Prunus bifrons
Prunus cortapico	Prunus cortapico
Pulasan	Nephelium ramboutan-ake
Queen palm fruit	Syagrus romanzoffiana
Rambutan	Nephelium lappaceum
Red bush apple	Syzygium suborbiculare
Rex satinash fruit	Syzygium apodophyllum
Riberry	Syzygium luehmannii
River cherry	Syzygium tierneyanum
Russian olive	Elaeagnus angustifolia
Sabal palm fruit	Sabal palmetto
Sageretia	Sageretia theezans
Sand cherry	Prunus pumila
Sansapote	Licania platypus
Sargent's cherry	Prunus sargentii
Savannah cherry	Eugenia calycina
Saw palmetto fruit	Serenoa repens
Sea apple	Syzygium grande
Sea coconut	Lodoicea maldivica
Sea grape	Coccoloba uvifera
Shoebutton ardisia	Ardisia elliptica
Short-stemmed plum	Prunus brachypetala
Siberian apricot	Prunus sibirica
Silver almond	Prunus argentea
Silver buffaloberry	Shepherdia argentea
Silver date palm fruit	Phoenix sylvestris
Silver peanut butter fruit	Bunchosia argentea
Silverberry	Elaeagnus commutata
Sloe	Prunus spinosa
Smooth stone peach	Prunus mira
Soh-sang	Elaeagnus latifolia
Sour cherry	Prunus cerasus
Sour cherry	Syzygium corynanthum
Sourplum	Ximenia afra
Spanish cherry	Mimusops elengi
Spanish lime	Melicoccus bijugatus
Staghorn sumac	Rhus typhina
Swamp maire	Syzygium maire
Syzygium alternifolium	Syzygium alternifolium
Syzygium calophyllifolium	Syzygium calophyllifolium
Syzygium calubcob	Syzygium calubcob
Syzygium cordatilimbum	Syzygium cordatilimbum
Syzygium crassipes	Syzygium crassipes
Syzygium eucalyptoides	Syzygium eucalyptoides
Syzygium gilletii	Syzygium gilletii
Syzygium incarnatum	Syzygium incarnatum
Syzygium mananquil	Syzygium mananquil
Syzygium masukuense	Syzygium masukuense
Syzygium micklethwaitii	Syzygium micklethwaitii
Syzygium multipetalum	Syzygium multipetalum
Syzygium owariense	Syzygium owariense
Syzygium scortechinii	Syzygium scortechinii
Syzygium simile	Syzygium simile
Syzygium xanthophyllum	Syzygium xanthophyllum
Taiwan cherry	Prunus campanulata
Tamarind-plum	Dialium indum
Tangut Almond	Prunus tangutica
Tapia	Uapaca bojeri
Texas almond	Prunus minutiflora
Texas peach	Prunus texana
Tianshan cherry	Prunus tianshanica
Umari	Poraqueiba sericea
Velvet tamarind	Dialium cochinchinense
Viagra palm fruit	Calamus erectus
Water apple	Syzygium jambos
Water berry	Syzygium cordatum
Water pear	Syzygium guineense
Watery rose apple	Syzygium aqueum
Wax apple	Syzygium samarangense
White apple	Syzygium forte
White aspen berry	Acronychia oblongifolia
White satinash fruit	Syzygium puberulum
Wild cherry	Prunus avium
Wild Himalayan cherry	Prunus cerasoides
Wild jujube	Ziziphus lotus
Wild peach	Terminalia carpentariae
Willow leaf cherry	Prunus incana
Winter-flowering cherry	Prunus × subhirtella
Wongi	Manilkara kauki
Wooly jelly palm fruit	Butia eriospatha
Xiao pu tao	Syzygium acuminatissimum
Yangmei	Myrica rubra
Yatay palm fruit	Butia yatay
Yellow mombin	Spondias mombin
Yellow plum	Ximenia americana
Yoshino cherry	Prunus × yedoensis
Ziziphus budhensis	Ziziphus budhensis
Zunna berry	Ziziphus rugosa
Zwetschge	Prunus domestica subsp. domestica

== Botanical berries ==
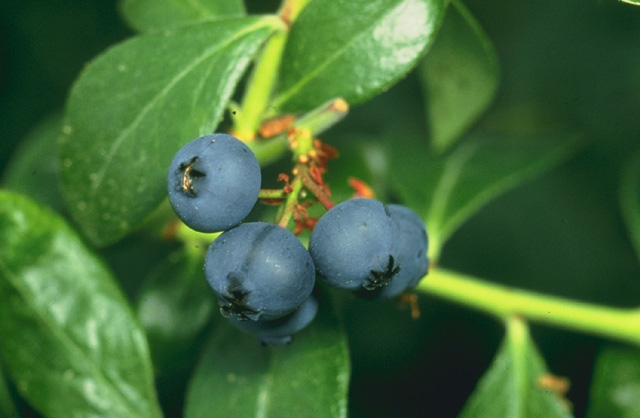
Blueberries

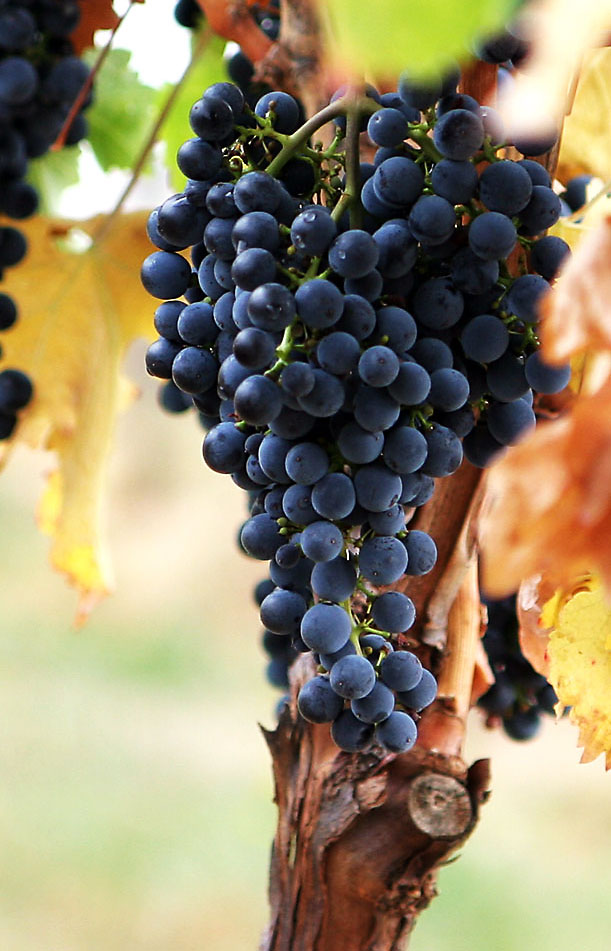
Grapes

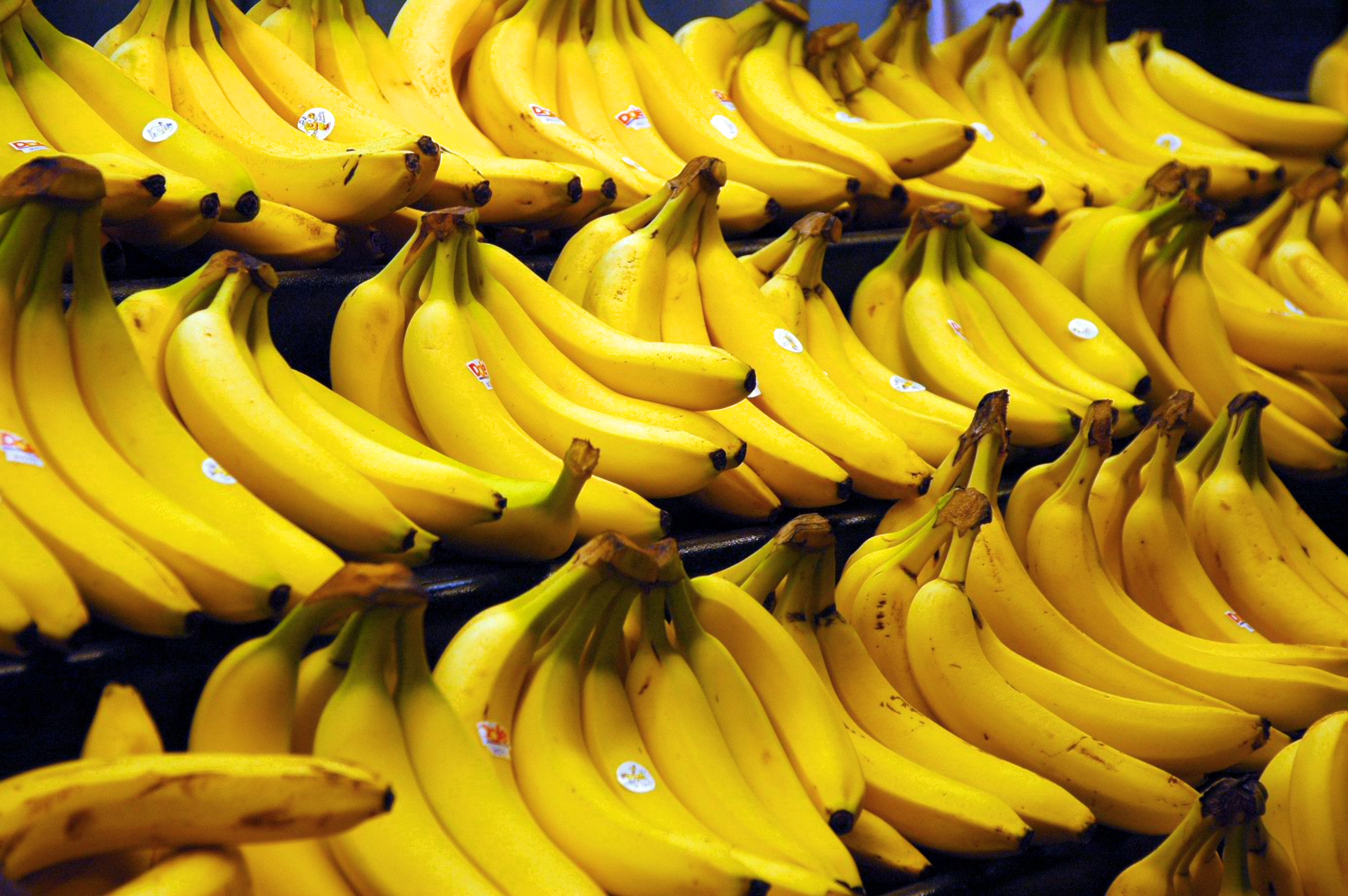
Bananas on grocery store shelves

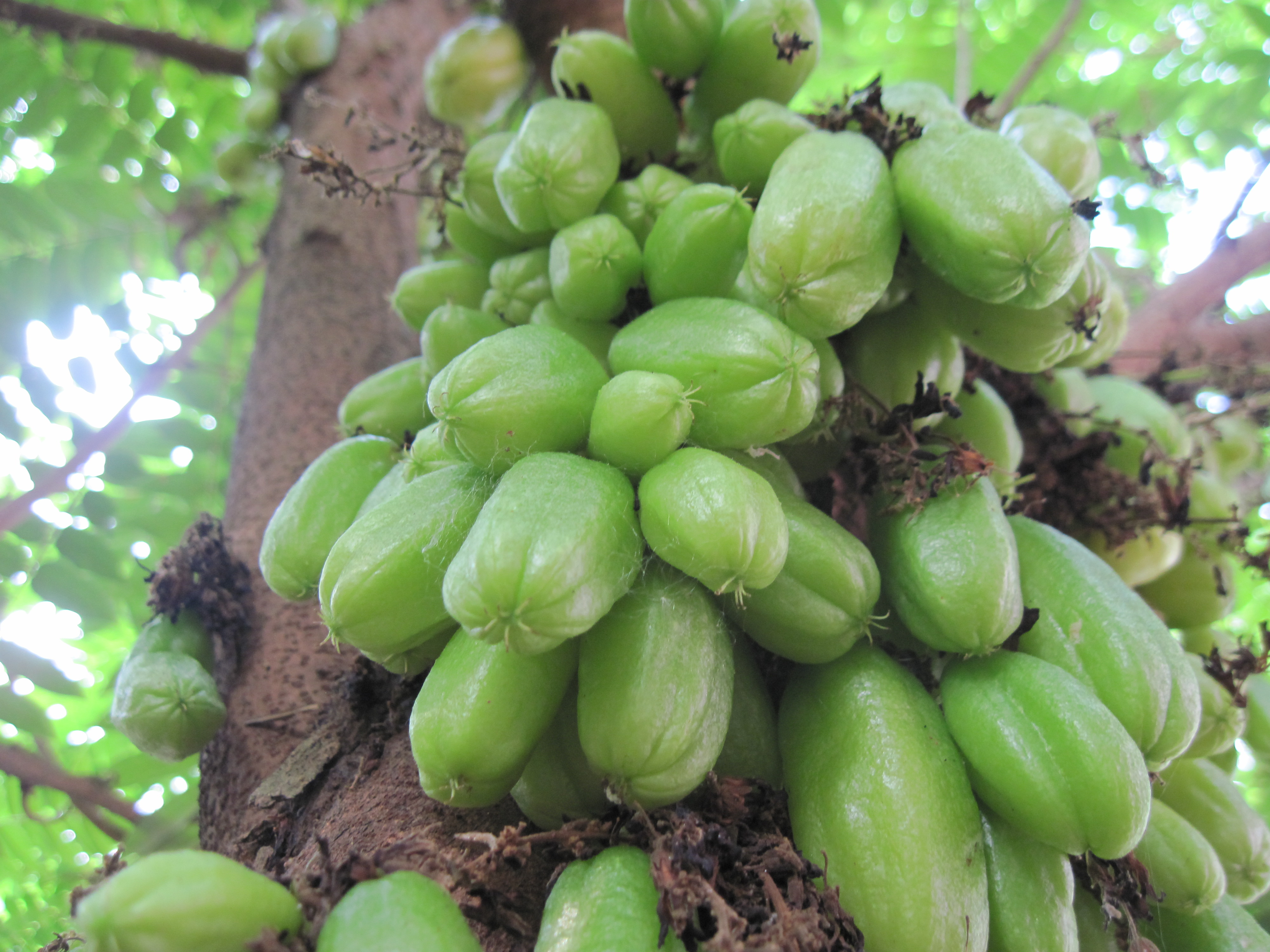
Bilimbi

Botanical berries represent any fruit that has a relatively thin exterior, with mostly flesh and more than one seed inside.

Common name	Species name
Abiu	Pouteria caimito
Aboirana	Pouteria venosa
American black elderberry	Sambucus canadensis
American persimmon	Diospyros virginiana
American red elderberry	Sambucus pubens
Apple berry	Billardiera scandens
Arabian coffee	Coffea arabica
Araza	Eugenia stipitata
Babaco	Vasconcellea × heilbornii
Banana	Musa acuminata
Banana passionfruit	Passiflora tarminiana
Barberry	Berberis vulgaris
Bearberry	Arctostaphylos uva-ursi
Bell apple	Passiflora nitida
Bengal currant	Carissa carandas
Bilberry	Vaccinium myrtillus
Bilberry cactus fruit	Myrtillocactus geometrizans
Bilimbi	Averrhoa bilimbi
Black currant	Ribes nigrum
Black sapote	Diospyros nigra
Blackberry jam fruit	Rosenbergiodendron formosum
Blue Java banana	Musa acuminata x balbisiana
Blue passionfruit	Passiflora caerulea
Blue sweet calabash	Passiflora morifolia
Blueberry	Vaccinium corymbosum
Bola verde	Anisocapparis speciosa
Bolivian fuchsia fruit	Fuchsia boliviana
Bolwarra	Eupomatia laurina
Bombona	Solanum pachyandrum
Borojó	Alibertia patinoi
Brazil cherry	Eugenia brasiliensis
Brazilian guava	Psidium guineense
Brown gardenia	Atractocarpus fitzalanii
Burahol	Stelechocarpus burahol
Bushveld bluebush	Diospyros lycioides
Cactus pineapple	Selenicereus setaceus
Cainito	Chrysophyllum cainito
Calabur fruit	Muntingia calabura
Cambuci	Campomanesia phaea
Camu camu	Myrciaria dubia
Canistel	Pouteria campechiana
Cape gooseberry	Physalis peruviana
Cardón fruit	Pachycereus pringlei
Cattley guava	Psidium cattleyanum
Ceylon gooseberry	Dovyalis hebecarpa
Chilean guava	Ugni molinae
Chinese gooseberry	Actinidia chinensis
Chupa-chupa	Matisia cordata
Cinnamon apple	Pouteria hypoglauca
Conkerberry	Carissa spinarum
Costa Rican guava	Psidium friedrichsthalianum
Costa Rican pitahaya	Selenicereus costaricensis
Cranberry	Vaccinium macrocarpon
Crimson passionfruit	Passiflora cinnabarina
Cruceta	Randia armata
Cuajilote	Parmentiera aculeata
Curuba	Passiflora mixta
Darwin's barberry	Berberis darwinii
Date-plum	Diospyros lotus
Davidson's plum	Davidsonia jerseyana
Desert passionfruit	Passiflora pentaschista
Dragon fruit	Selenicereus undatus
Dutchman's laudanum	Passiflora rubra
Eggfruit	Lucuma campechiana
Elderberry	Sambucus nigra
Esporão-de-galo	Randia calycina
Fe'i banana	Musa × troglodytarum
Feijoa	Feijoa sellowiana
Fox grape	Vitis labrusca
Gardenia	Gardenia jasminoides
Garlic passionfruit	Passiflora loefgrenii
Giant granadilla	Passiflora quadrangularis
Giant highland banana	Musa ingens
Glenniea philippinensis	Glenniea philippinensis
Golden kiwifruit	Actinidia chinensis var. chinensis
Gooseberry	Ribes uva-crispa
Grape	Vitis vinifera
Green sapote	Pouteria viridis
Guab	Diospyros malabarica
Guava	Psidium guajava
Hardy kiwi	Actinidia arguta
Honeyberry	Lonicera caerulea
Honeysuckle	Lonicera periclymenum
Huckleberry	Vaccinium ovatum
Jabuticaba	Plinia cauliflora
Kei apple	Dovyalis afra
Kiwifruit	Actinidia chinensis var. deliciosa
Kolomicta	Actinidia kolomikta
Kubal	Willughbeia sarawacensis
Lingonberry	Vaccinium vitis-idaea
Lúcuma	Pouteria lucuma
Malabar plum	Syzygium jambos
Mammee	Mammea americana
Mandacaru	Cereus jamacaru
Mangaba	Hancornia speciosa
Maqui berry	Aristotelia chilensis
Maracuja Bravo	Passiflora gibertii
Maracuja Mochila	Passiflora cincinnata
Maracuja Redondo	Passiflora picturata
Mayapple	Podophyllum peltatum
Maypop	Passiflora incarnata
Meli	Amomyrtus meli
Midgen berry	Austromyrtus dulcis
Mortiño	Vaccinium floribundum
Mountain granadilla	Passiflora ambigua
Mountain papaya	Vasconcellea pubescens
Muscadine	Vitis rotundifolia
Musho	Jaltomata cajacayensis
Naranjilla	Solanum quitoense
Native currant	Acrotriche depressa
New Zealand passionfruit	Passiflora tetrandra
Nipple beehive cactus fruit	Coryphantha macromeris
Ocoki	Pouteria ucuqui
Ooray	Davidsonia pruriens
Oowel paap	Passiflora serratifolia
Oregon grape	Mahonia aquifolium
Oubli fruit	Pentadiplandra brazzeana
Papaya	Carica papaya
Passiflora ampullacea	Passiflora ampullacea
Passiflora platyloba	Passiflora platyloba
Passionfruit	Passiflora edulis
Pepino	Solanum muricatum
Perfumed passionfruit	Passiflora vitifolia
Persimmon	Diospyros kaki
Peruvian apple cactus fruit	Cereus repandus
Pink banana	Musa velutina
Pitahaya de ocampo	Selenicereus ocamponis
Pitaya-da-guatemala	Selenicereus guatemalensis
Pitomba-da-bahia	Eugenia luschnathiana
Planchonella maclayana	Planchonella maclayana
Plantain	Musa balbisiana
Pomegranate	Punica granatum
Poro poro	Passiflora pinnatistipula
Prickly pear fruit	Opuntia ficus-indica
Purple apple-berry	Billardiera longiflora
Purple guava	Psidium rufum
Purple kiwi	Actinidia melanandra
Puruí	Alibertia edulis
Red banana passionfruit	Passiflora antioquiensis
Red currant	Ribes rubrum
Red huckleberry	Vaccinium parvifolium
Red passionfruit	Passiflora manicata
Rukam	Flacourtia rukam
Saguaro fruit	Carnegiea gigantea
Salal	Gaultheria shallon
Scarlet passionfruit	Passiflora coccinea
Sea anemone passionfruit	Passiflora actinia
Sea buckthorn	Hippophae rhamnoides
Selenicereus stenopterus	Selenicereus stenopterus
Small-leaved fuchsia	Fuchsia microphylla
Small-leaved myrtle berry	Archirhodomyrtus beckleri
Smooth davidson's plum	Davidsonia johnsonii
Solomon's plume	Maianthemum racemosum
South American sapote	Quararibea cordata
Star fruit	Averrhoa carambola
Stinking passionfruit	Passiflora foetida
Strawberry tree fruit	Arbutus unedo
Sugar plum	Uapaca kirkiana
Swartbas	Diospyros whyteana
Sweet apple-berry	Billardiera cymosa
Sweet calabash	Passiflora maliformis
Sweet granadilla	Passiflora ligularis
Tamarillo	Solanum betaceum
Texas persimmon	Diospyros texana
Tumbo	Passiflora tripartita
Velvet apple	Diospyros blancoi
Wampee	Clausena lansium
Water lemon	Passiflora laurifolia
White passionfruit	Passiflora subpeltata
Wild orange	Capparis mitchellii
Wild passionfruit	Passiflora membranacea
Winged-stem passionfruit	Passiflora alata
Wolfberry	Lycium barbarum
Wooly abiu	Pouteria torta
Yellow dragon fruit	Selenicereus megalanthus
Yellow granadilla	Passiflora edulis f flavicarpa

== Pepos ==
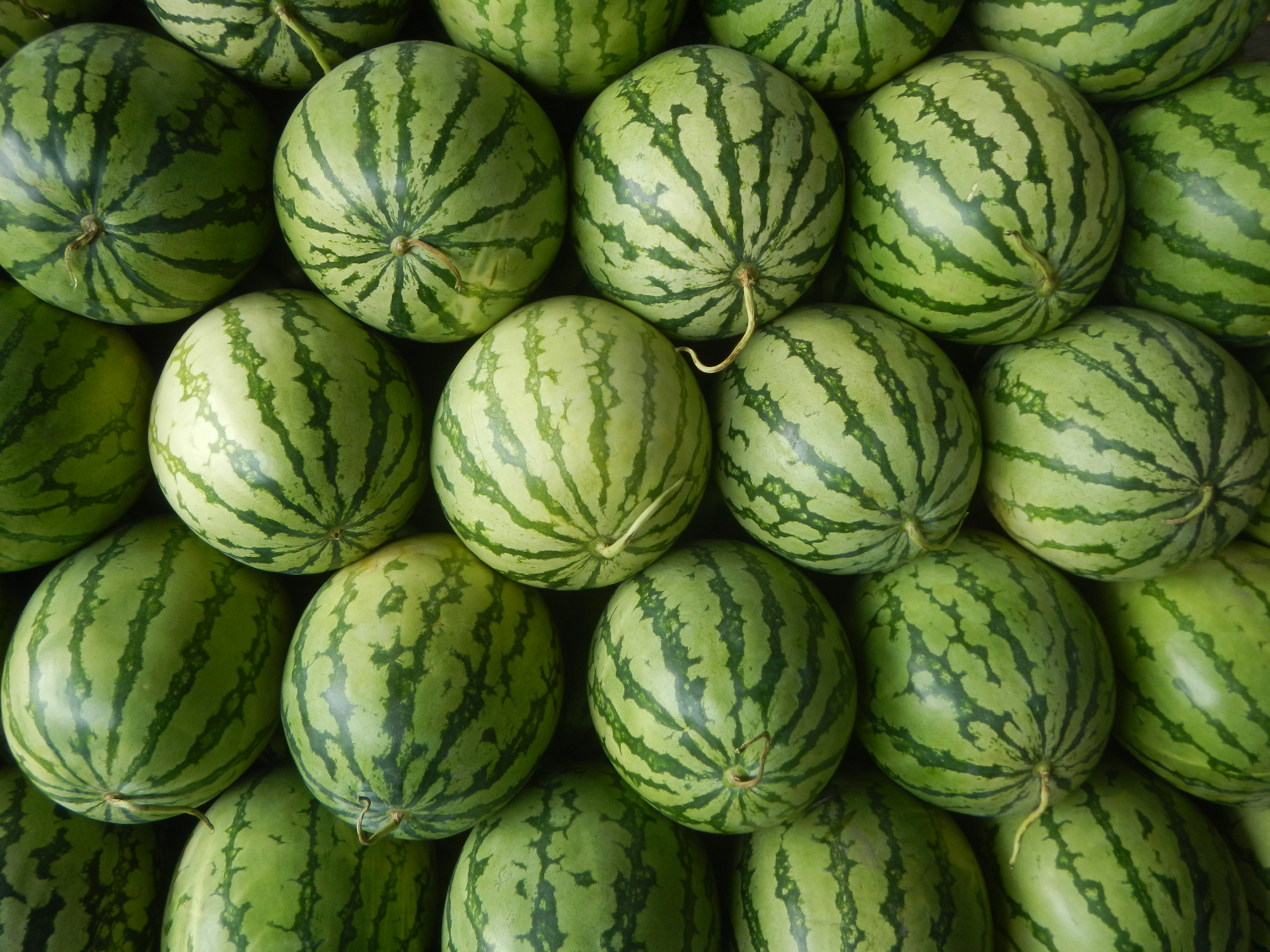
Watermelons

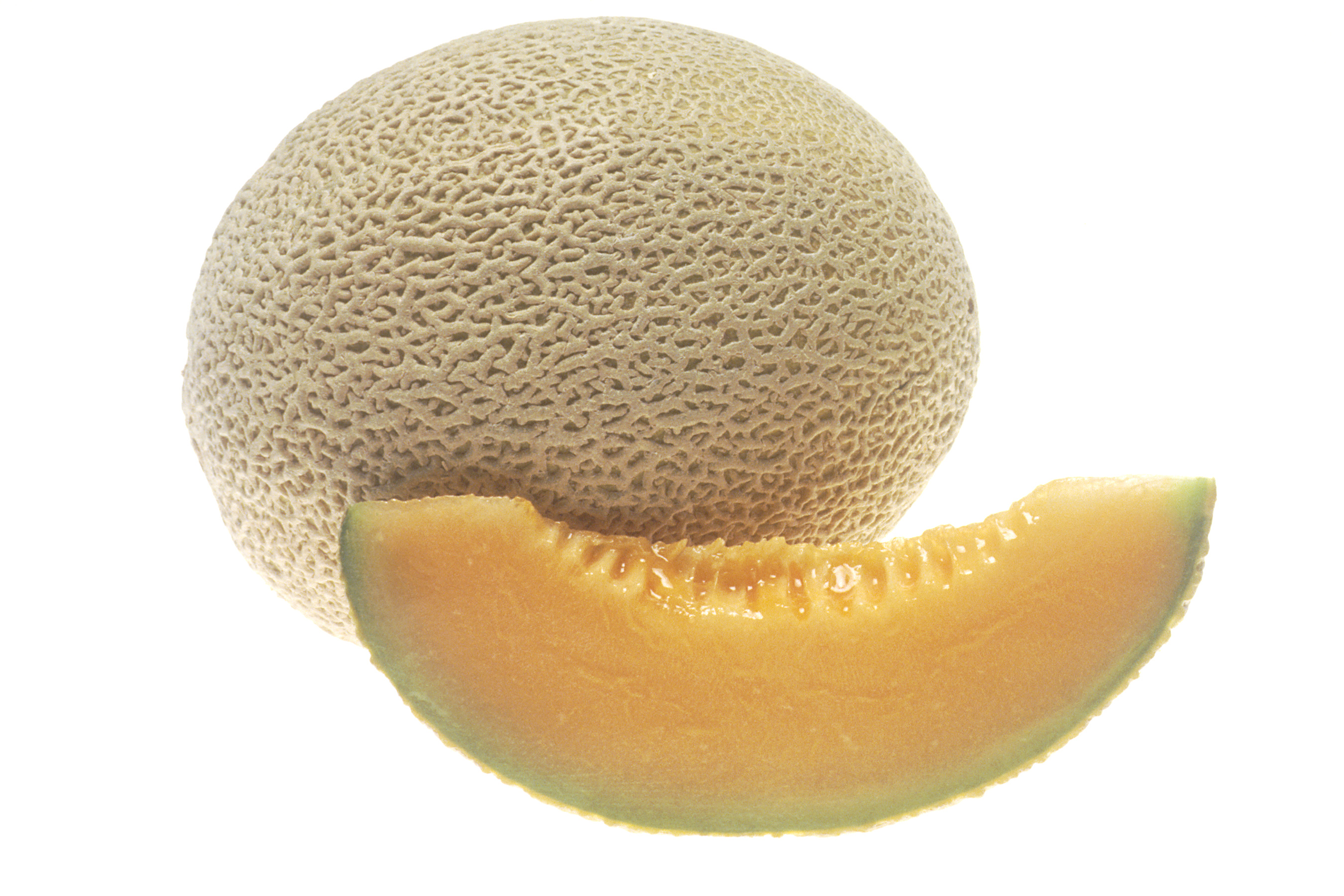
Cantaloupe and slice

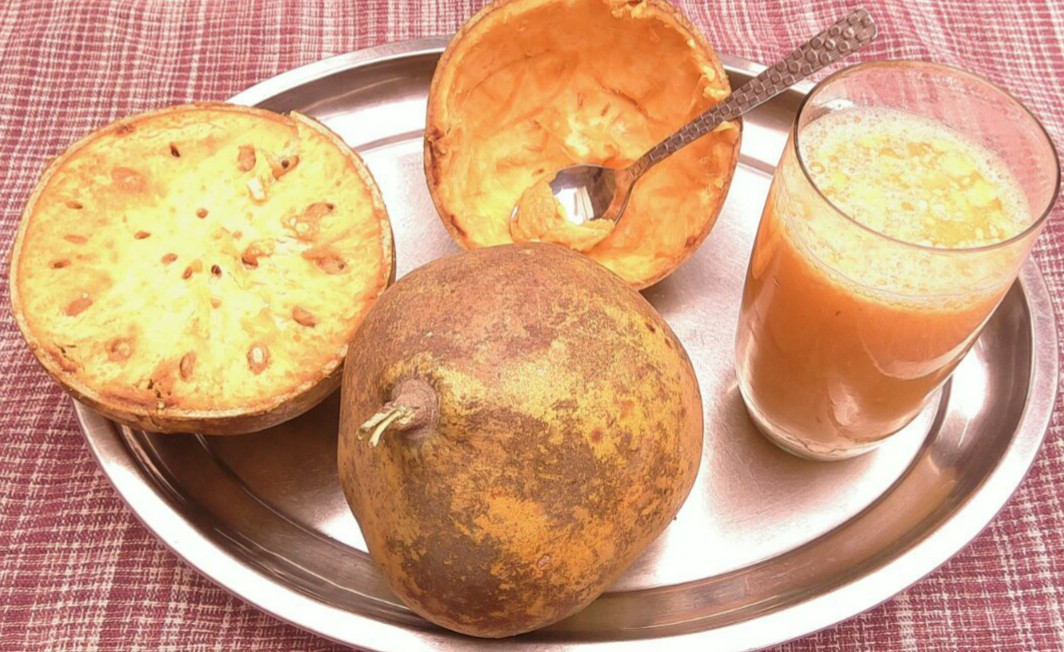
Bael being made into bael ka sharbat, a popular Indian drink

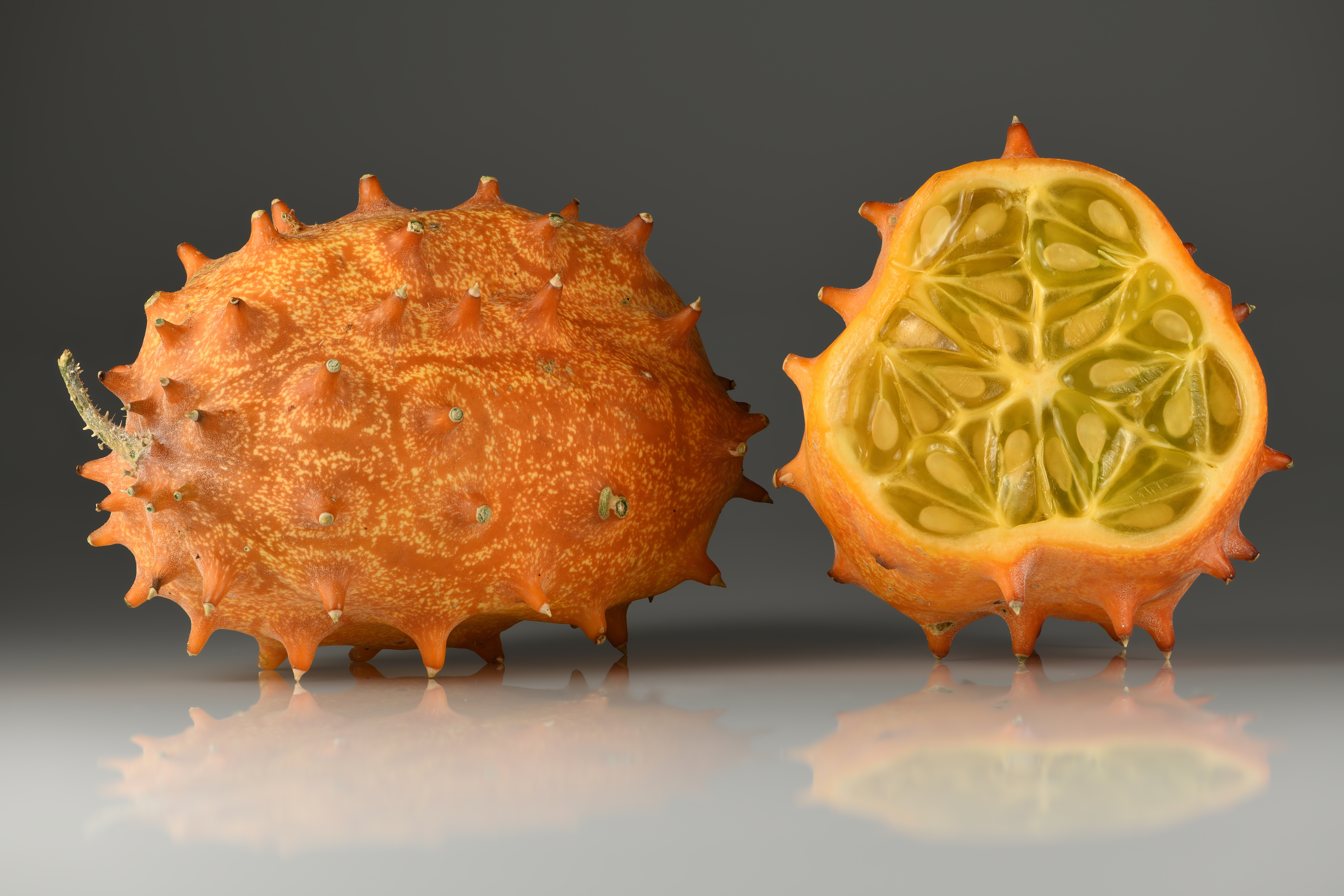
Horned melon (kiwano)

Pepos represent any fruit that is covered by a hard, thick rind with soft flesh inside, and seeds filling each locule. Melons are good examples of this.

Common name	Species name
African baobab fruit	Adansonia digitata
Australian baobab fruit	Adansonia gregorii
Bael	Aegle marmelos
Bailan melon	Cucumis melo var. inodorus 'Bailan'
Banana melon	Cucumis melo 'Banana'
Banana yucca	Yucca baccata
Canary melon	Cucumis melo var. inodorus 'Canary'
Cassabanana	Sicana odorifera
Citron melon	Citrullus amarus
Crane melon	Cucumis melo 'Crane'
Crenshaw melon	Cucumis melo 'Crenshaw'
Doub palm fruit	Borassus flabellifer
European cantaloupe	Cucumis melo var. cantalupensis
Fony baobab fruit	Adansonia rubrostipa
Gaya melon	Cucumis melo 'Gaya'
Honeydew melon	Cucumis melo var. inodorus
Jackal food	Hydnora africana
Jícara	Crescentia cujete
Kajari melon	Cucumis melo 'Kajari'
Kiwano	Cucumis metuliferus
Kiwano rund	Cucumis metuliferus var. rund
Kolkhoznitsa melon	Cucumis melo 'Kolkhoznitsa'
Limelon	Cucumis melo var. limelon
Mirza melon	Cucumis melo 'Mirza'
Muskmelon	Cucumis melo
Natal orange	Strychnos spinosa
North American cantaloupe	Cucumis melo var. reticulatus
Oriental melon	Cucumis melo Makuwa Group
Santa Claus melon	Cucumis melo var. inodorus 'Sancho'
Sprite melon	Cucumis melo 'Sprite'
Tigger melon	Cucumis melo 'Tigger'
Tuka	Hydnora abyssinica
Watermelon	Citrullus lanatus
Wild cucumber	Cucumis prophetarum
Wood-apple	Limonia acidissima

== Hesperidiums ==
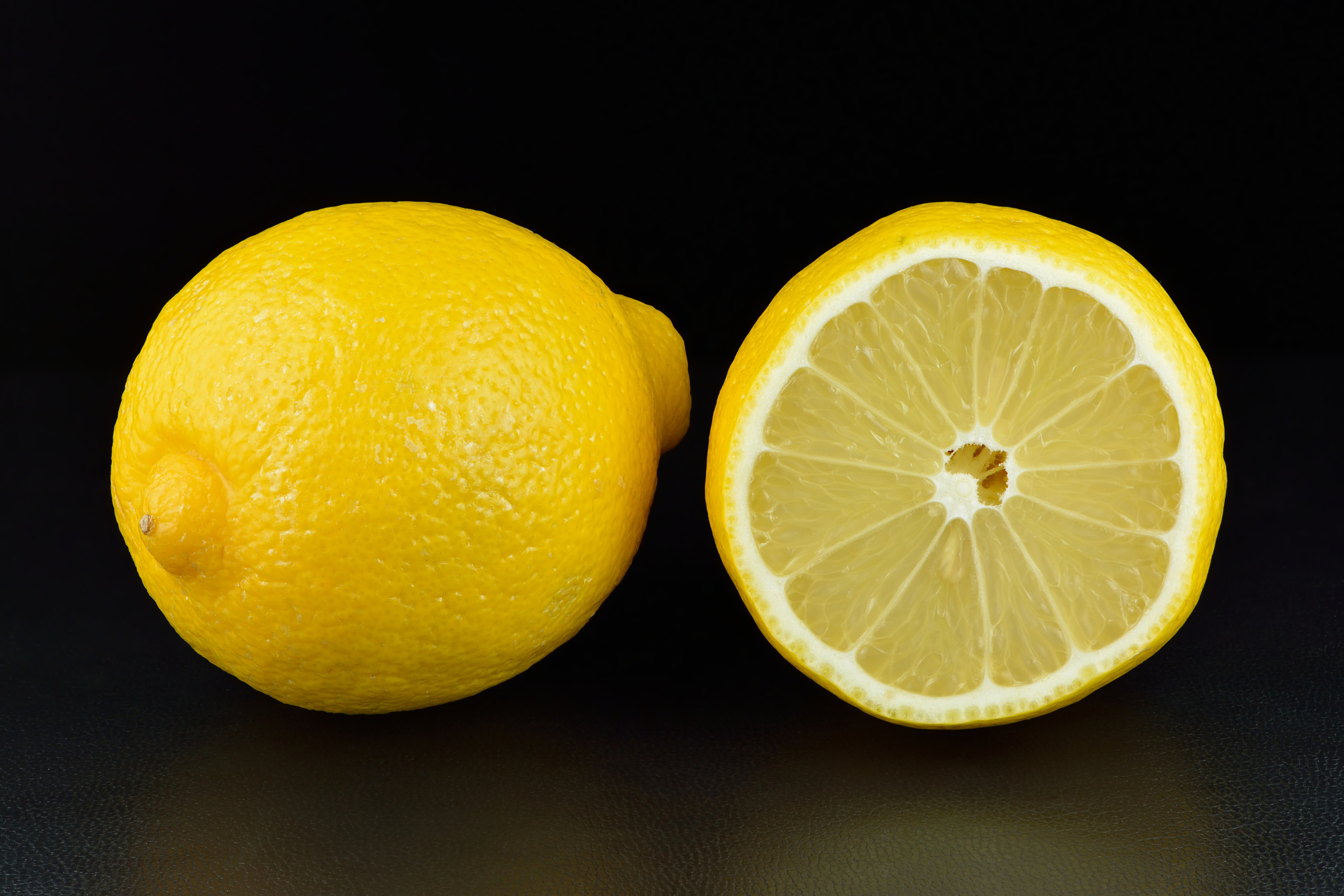
One whole lemon and one cut in half

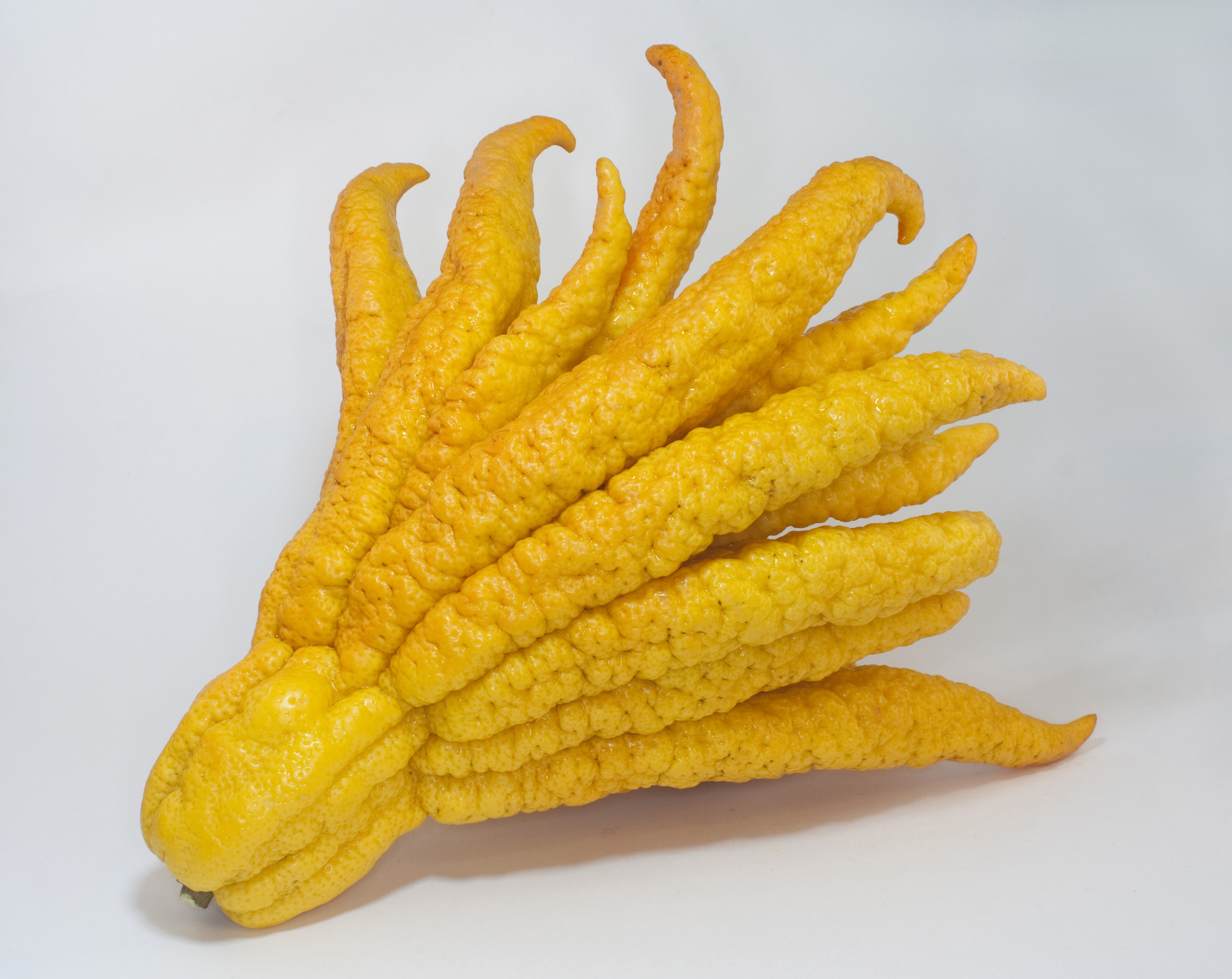
The buddha's hand, a uniquely shaped variant of citron

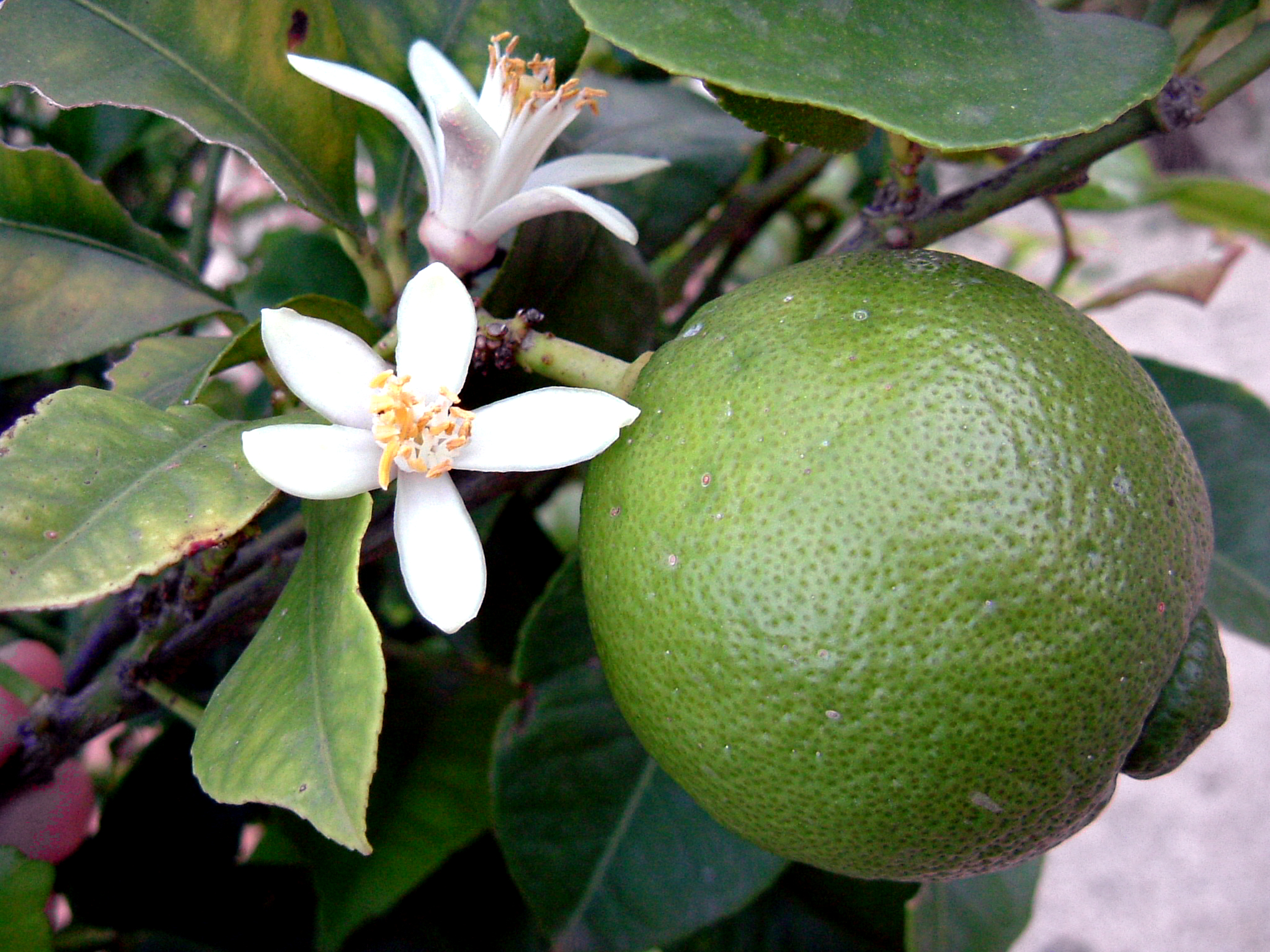
Lime and blossom

Also known as citruses, hesperidiums possess thick and leathery rinds. These fruits are generally sour and acidic to some extent and have a wagon wheel-like cross section.

Common name	Species name
African cherry orange	Citropsis articulata
Amanatsu	Citrus × natsudaidai
Bajoura citron	Citrus medica ssp. bajoura
Bergamot orange	Citrus bergamia
Bitter orange	Citrus × aurantium
Blood lime	Citrus australasica var. sanguinea × 'Ellendale'
Blood orange	Citrus × sinensis Blood Group
Buddha's hand	Citrus medica var. sarcodactylis
Calamansi	Citrus × microcarpa
Cam sành	Citrus reticulata × sinensis
Cara Cara navel orange	Citrus × sinensis 'Cara Cara'
Centennial variegated kumquat	Citrus margarita 'Centennial Variegated'
Citron	Citrus medica
Clementine	Citrus × clementina
Desert lime	Citrus glauca
Etrog	Citrus medica var. ethrog
Finger lime	Citrus australasica
Florentine citron	Citrus × limonimedica
Grapefruit	Citrus × aurantium f. aurantium
Haruka	Citrus tamurana × natsudaidai
Hassaku	Citrus hassaku
Hyuganatsu	Citrus tamurana
Ichang papeda	Citrus cavaleriei
Iyokan	Citrus × iyo
Jiangsu kumquat	Citrus obovata
Kabosu	Citrus sphaerocarpa
Kaffir lime	Citrus hystrix
Kanpei	Citrus reticulata 'Kanpei'
Katayoe'	Citrus taiwanica
Kawachi bankan	Citrus kawachiensis
Key lime	Citrus × aurantiifolia
Kinkoji unshiu	Citrus obovoidea × unshiu
Kinnow	Citrus nobilis × citrus × deliciosa
Kiyomi	Citrus unshiu × sinensis
Kobayashi mikan	Citrus natsudaidai × unshiu
Koji orange	Citrus leiocarpa
Kuchinotsu No.37	Citrus unshiu × sinensis 'Kiyomi' × Citrus nobilis × deliciosa 'Encore'
Kumquat	Citrus japonica
Lemon	Citrus × limon
Lime	Citrus × latifolia
Limeberry	Triphasia trifolia
Limequat	Citrus × floridana
Mandarin orange	Citrus reticulata
Mangshanyegan	Citrus mangshanensis
Melogold	Citrus maxima × Citrus × aurantium f. aurantium
Meyer lemon	Citrus × meyeri
Micrantha	Citrus hystrix var. micrantha
Moro blood orange	Citrus × sinensis Blood Group 'Moro'
Myrtle-leaved orange	Citrus myrtifolia
Ōgonkan	Citrus flaviculpus
Ojai pixie	Citrus reticulata 'Ojai Pixie'
Orange	Citrus × sinensis
Oroblanco	Citrus maxima × Citrus × aurantium f. aurantium
Oval kumquat	Citrus margarita
Pomelo	Citrus maxima
Pompia	Citrus medica var. tuberosa
Ponderosa lemon	Citrus × pyriformis
Rangpur	Citrus × limonia
Round lime	Citrus australis
Sanguinello blood orange	Citrus × sinensis Blood Group 'Sanguinello'
Satsuma mandarin	Citrus unshiu
Shangjuan	Citrus cavaleriei × Citrus maxima
Shonan gold	Citrus flaviculpus × Citrus unshiu 'Imamura'
Sudachi	Citrus sudachi
Sweet limetta	Citrus limetta
Sweet orange	Citrus × aurantium f. aurantium
Taiwan tangerine	Citrus × depressa
Tangelo	Citrus × tangelo
Tangerine	Citrus × tangerina
Tangor	Citrus reticulata × sinensis
Tarocco blood orange	Citrus × sinensis Blood Group 'Tarocco'
Ugli fruit	Citrus reticulata × Citrus × aurantium f. aurantium
Volkamer lemon	Citrus volkameriana
Yuzu	Citrus × junos

== Aggregate fruits ==
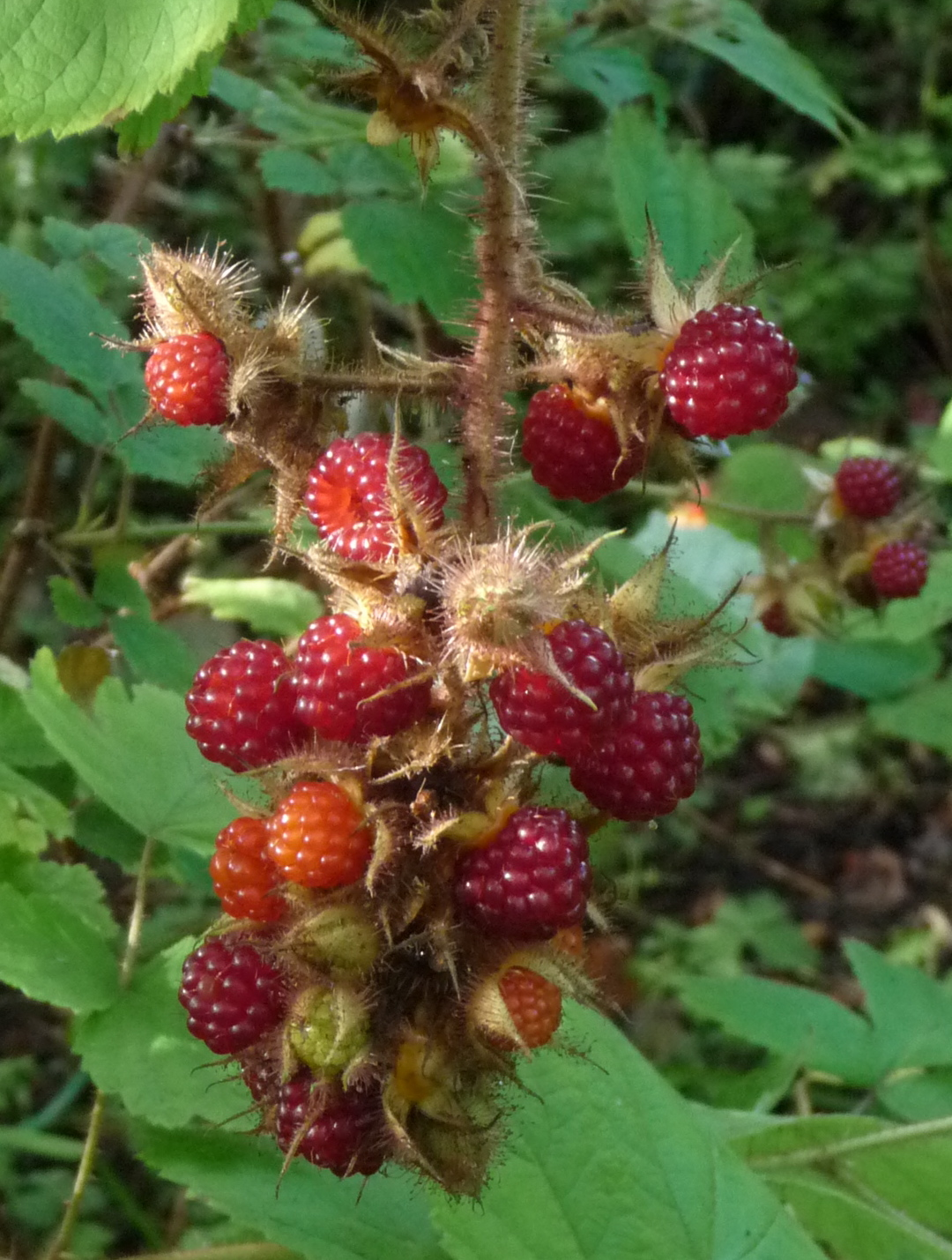
Wineberries

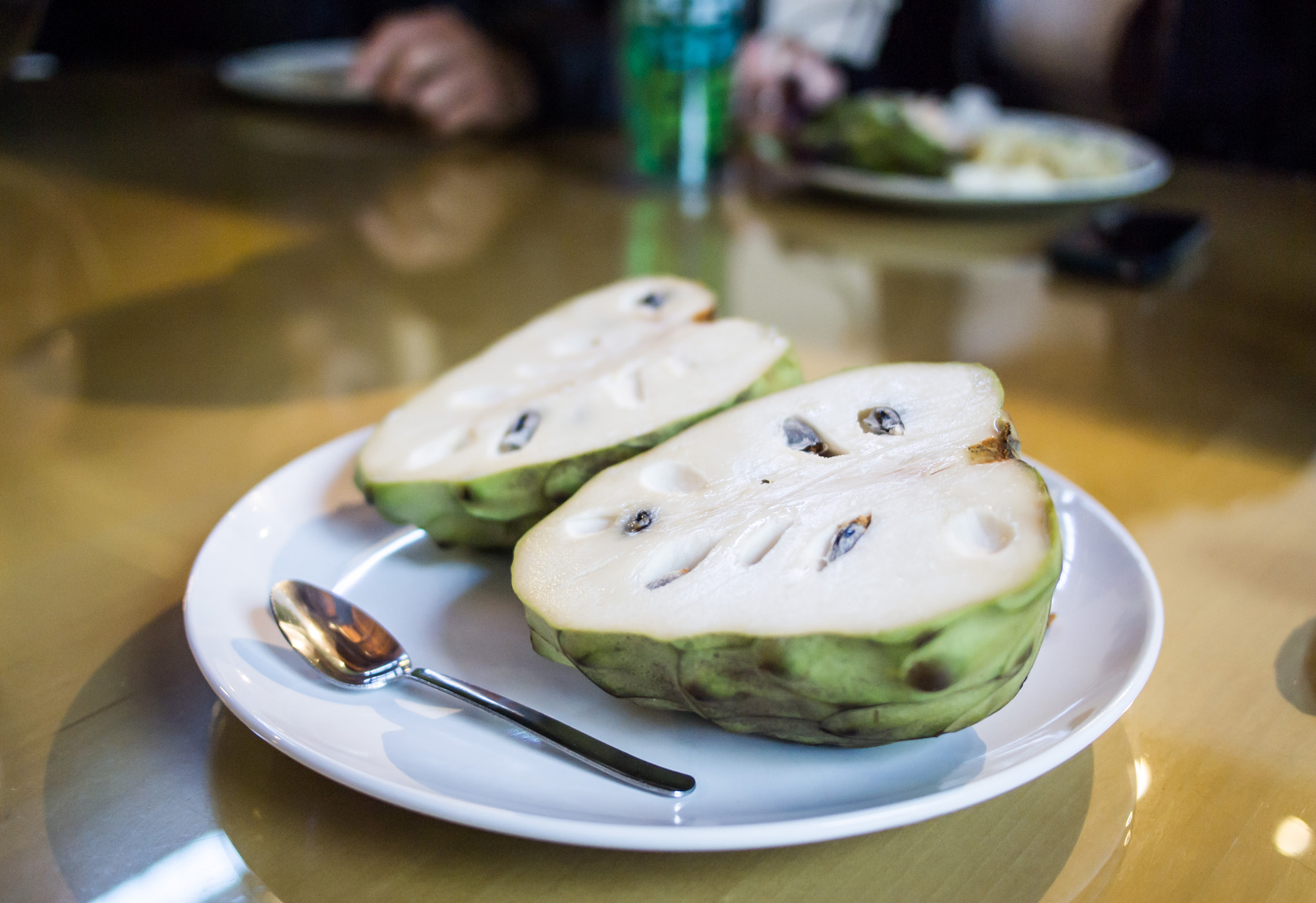
A sliced cherimoya

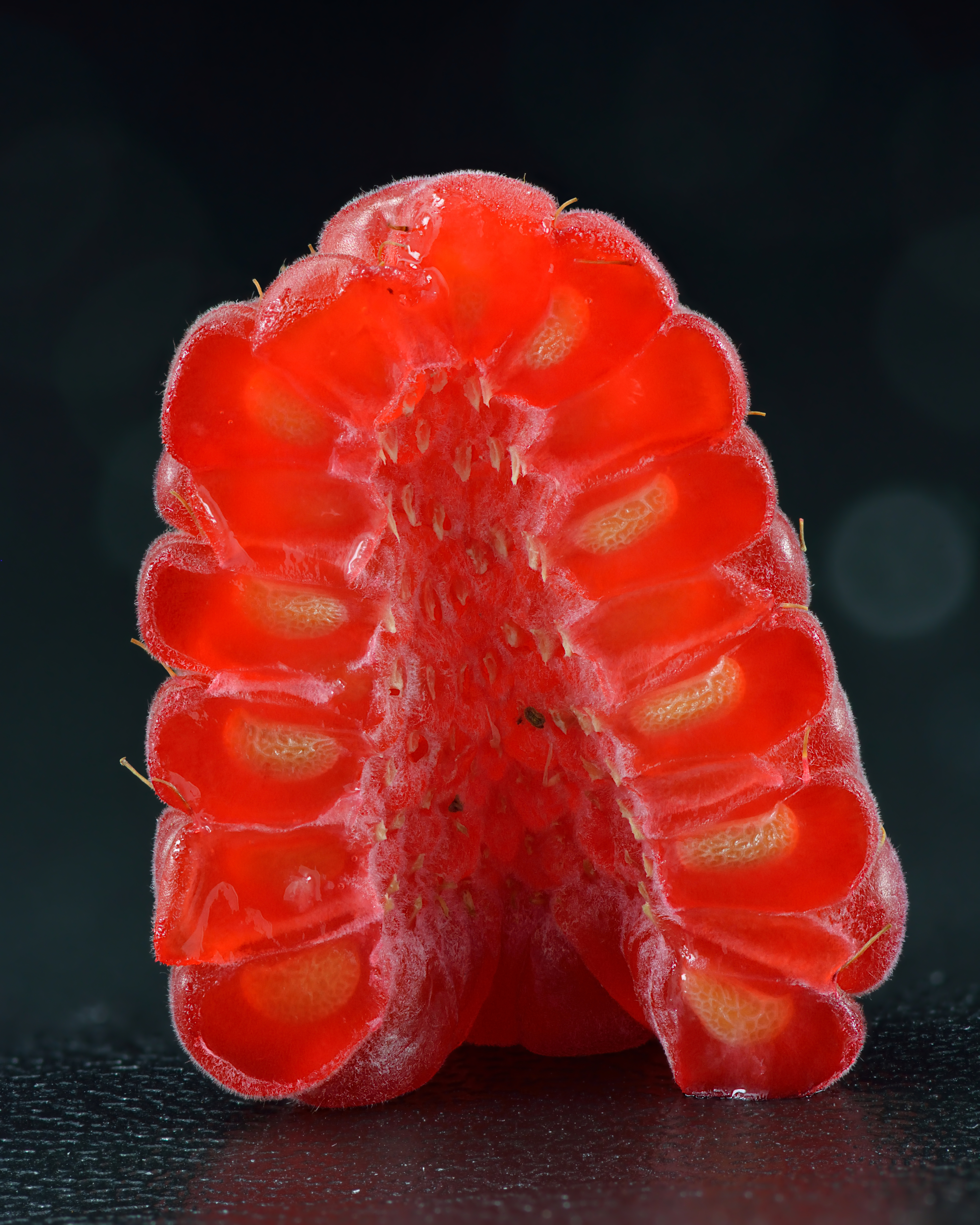
Half of a raspberry

Aggregate fruits are a cluster of many fruits produced from a single flower.

Common name	Species name
African custard-apple	Annona senegalensis
American beautyberry	Callicarpa americana
American red raspberry	Rubus strigosus
Annona aurantiaca	Annona aurantiaca
Annona conica	Annona conica
Annona longiflora	Annona longiflora
Annona paludosa	Annona paludosa
Annonilla	Annona nitida
Araticum	Annona coriacea
Araticum-cagão	Annona cacans
Araticum-de-raposa	Annona cornifolia
Araticum-do-pantanal	Annona nutans
Aratincum do Para	Annona sericea
Arctic raspberry	Rubus arcticus
Armenian blackberry	Rubus armeniacus
Atemoya	Annona squamosa × Annona cherimola
Atherton raspberry	Rubus probus
Atibulnak	Rubus pectinellus
Balloon berry	Rubus illecebrosus
Beach strawberry	Fragaria chiloensis
Beach sugar apple	Annona salzmannii
Biribá	Annona mucosa
Black mulberry	Morus nigra
Black raspberry	Rubus occidentalis
Blackberry	Rubus allegheniensis
Boysenberry	Rubus ursinus × Rubus idaeus
California blackberry	Rubus ursinus
Cawesh	Annona scleroderma
Cherimoya	Annona cherimola
Chinese bramble berry	Rubus tricolor
Cloudberry	Rubus chamaemorus
Creeping raspberry	Rubus hayata-koidzumii
Cudrang	Maclura tricuspidata
Custard apple	Annona reticulata
Cutleaf evergreen blackberry	Rubus laciniatus
Delicious raspberry	Rubus deliciosus
Dewberry	Rubus flagellaris
Dwarf red blackberry	Rubus pubescens
Elephant apple	Dillenia indica
Elmleaf blackberry	Rubus ulmifolius
Emu berry	Grewia retusifolia
European dewberry	Rubus caesius
European red raspberry	Rubus idaeus
Five-leaved bramble berry	Rubus pedatus
Garden dewberry	Rubus aboriginum
Golden Himalayan raspberry	Rubus ellipticus
Grateful bramble berry	Rubus gratus
Gummy Bear fruit	Cecropia peltata
Gympie-gympie fruit	Dendrocnide moroides
Hawaiian raspberry	Rubus hawaiensis
Ilama	Annona diversifolia
Japanese bramble berry	Rubus parvifolius
Korean blackberry	Rubus coreanus
Korean raspberry	Rubus crataegifolius
Kousa dogwood fruit	Cornus kousa
Loganberry	Rubus × loganobaccus
Manirito	Annona jahnii
Marolo	Annona crassiflora
Mock strawberry	Potentilla indica
Molucca bramble berry	Rubus moluccanus
Molucca raspberry	Rubus sieboldii
Mora común	Rubus adenotrichos
Mora de Castilla	Rubus glaucus
Mountain raspberry	Rubus fraxinifolius
Mountain soursop	Annona montana
Mysore raspberry	Rubus niveus
Nepalese raspberry	Rubus nepalensis
Pineberry	Fragaria virginiana × chiloensis
Pond apple	Annona glabra
Purple-flowered raspberry	Rubus odoratus
Red mulberry	Morus rubra
Rose hip	Rosa sp.
Roseleaf bramble berry	Rubus rosifolius
Rubus adenophorus	Rubus adenophorus
Rubus biflorus	Rubus biflorus
Rubus roseus	Rubus roseus
Rubus xanthocarpus	Rubus xanthocarpus
Salmonberry	Rubus spectabilis
Sawtooth blackberry	Rubus argutus
Sinko raspberry	Rubus corchorifolius
Smooth blackberry	Rubus canadensis
Snow raspberry	Rubus nivalis
Soncoya	Annona purpurea
Soursop	Annona muricata
Stone bramble berry	Rubus saxatilis
Strawberry	Fragaria × ananassa
Sugar-apple	Annona squamosa
Susung-kalabaw	Uvaria rufa
Tasmanian alpine raspberry	Rubus gunnianus
Tātarāmoa	Rubus cissoides
Tayberry	Rubus fruticosus × Rubus idaeus
Thimbleberry	Rubus parviflorus
Ububese	Annona stenophylla
White bark raspberry	Rubus leucodermis
White mulberry	Morus alba
White-stemmed bramble	Rubus cockburnianus
Wild cherimoya	Annona hypoglauca
Wild strawberry	Fragaria vesca
Wineberry	Rubus phoenicolasius
Youngberry	Rubus caesius 'Youngberry'

== Multiple fruits ==
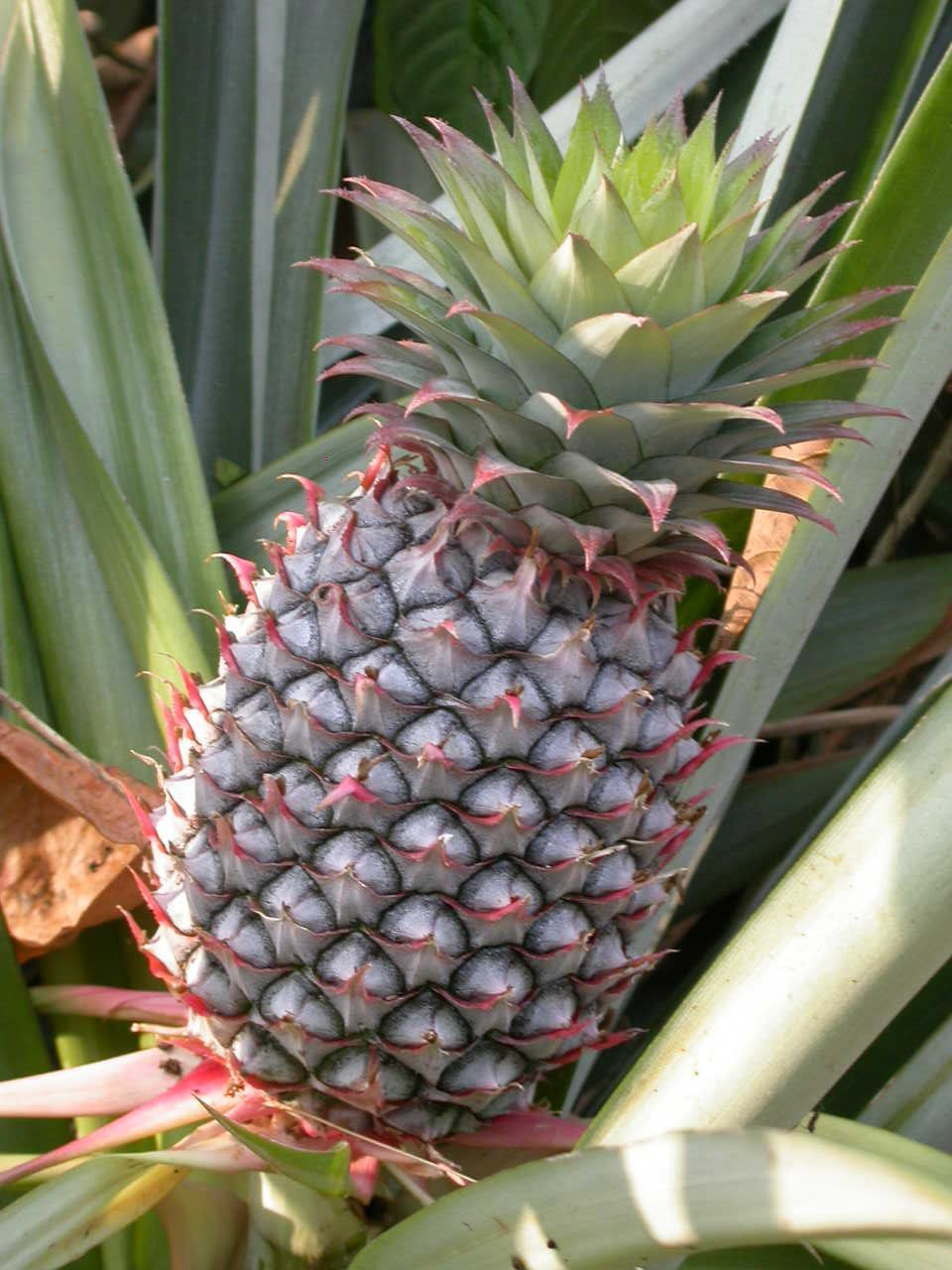
The pineapple is a multiple fruit.

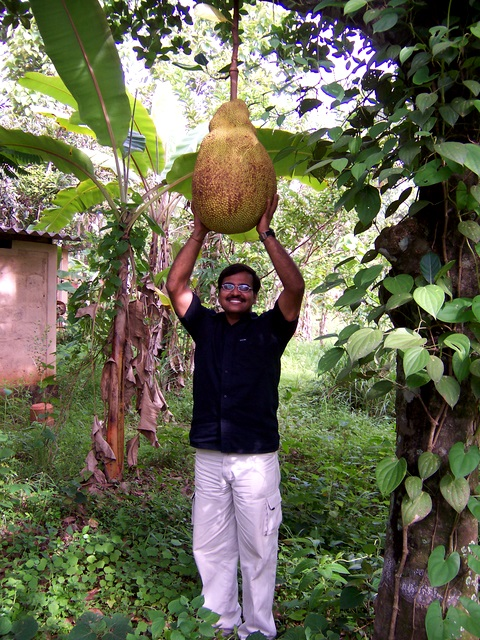
The jackfruit is known for being the world's largest tree-borne fruit.

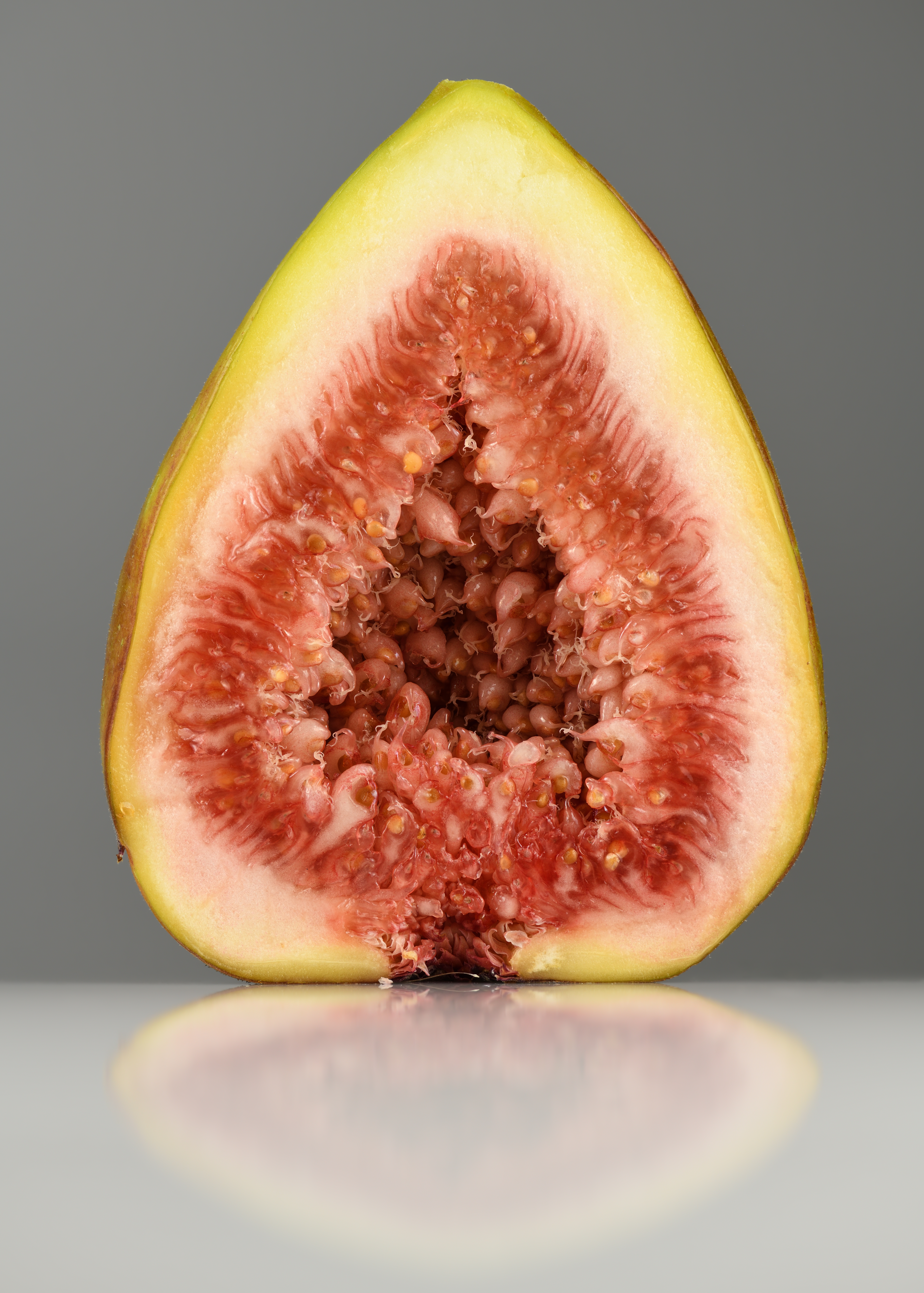
A halved fig

Multiple fruits are a cluster of many fruits produced from multiple flowers.

Common name	Species name
African peach	Nauclea latifolia
Antipolo	Artocarpus blancoi
Artocarpus glaucus	Artocarpus glaucus
Artocarpus lowii	Artocarpus lowii
Bondon	Artocarpus brevipedunculatus
Breadfruit	Artocarpus altilis
Breadnut	Artocarpus camansi
Cempedak	Artocarpus integer
Ceylon breadfruit	Artocarpus nobilis
Chaplaish	Artocarpus chama
Clown fig	Ficus aspera
Cluster fig	Ficus racemosa
Desert fig	Ficus platypoda
Dugdug	Artocarpus mariannensis
Duguetia confinis	Duguetia confinis
Duguetia spixiana	Duguetia spixiana
Duguetia vallicola	Duguetia vallicola
Dye fig	Ficus tinctoria
Entawak	Artocarpus anisophyllus
False pineapple	Ananas macrodontes
Ficus carrii	Ficus carrii
Ficus neriifolia	Ficus neriifolia
Ficus wassa	Ficus wassa
Fig	Ficus carica
Hairy fig	Ficus simplicissima
Hala fruit	Pandanus tectorius
Higuera blanca	Ficus insipida
Is-is	Ficus ulmifolia
Jackfruit	Artocarpus heterophyllus
Japanese fig	Ficus erecta
Keledang	Artocarpus lanceifolius
Kesusu	Prainea limpato
Kwai muk	Artocarpus parvus
Marang	Artocarpus odoratissimus
Mexican breadfruit	Monstera deliciosa
Monkey fruit	Artocarpus lacucha
Monkey jackfruit	Artocarpus rigidus
Noni	Morinda citrifolia
Oakleaf fig	Ficus montana
Pelas	Ficus sinuata
Pelas kebo	Ficus parietalis
Peluntan	Artocarpus sericicarpus
Pineapple	Ananas comosus
Pingan	Artocarpus sarawakensis
Pinkglow pineapple	Ananas comosus 'Pinkglow'
Pudu	Artocarpus kemando
Queen Victoria pineapple	Ananas comosus 'Queen Victoria'
Red fruit	Pandanus conoideus
River sandpaper fig	Ficus capreifolia
Sampang	Artocarpus gomezianus
Sandpaper fig	Ficus coronata
Strangler fig	Ficus aurea
Sugarloaf pineapple	Ananas comosus 'Sugarloaf'
Sweet sandpaper fig	Ficus opposita
Sycamore fig	Ficus sycomorus
Tamaran	Artocarpus tamaran
Terap hitam	Artocarpus scortechinii
Terap nasi	Artocarpus elasticus
Tilap	Artocarpus teysmannii
Two-colored jackfruit	Artocarpus styracifolius
White fig	Ficus virens
White kwai muk	Artocarpus hypargyreus
White sandpaper fig	Ficus fraseri
Wild fig	Ficus palmata
Wild jack	Artocarpus hirsutus

== Capsules ==
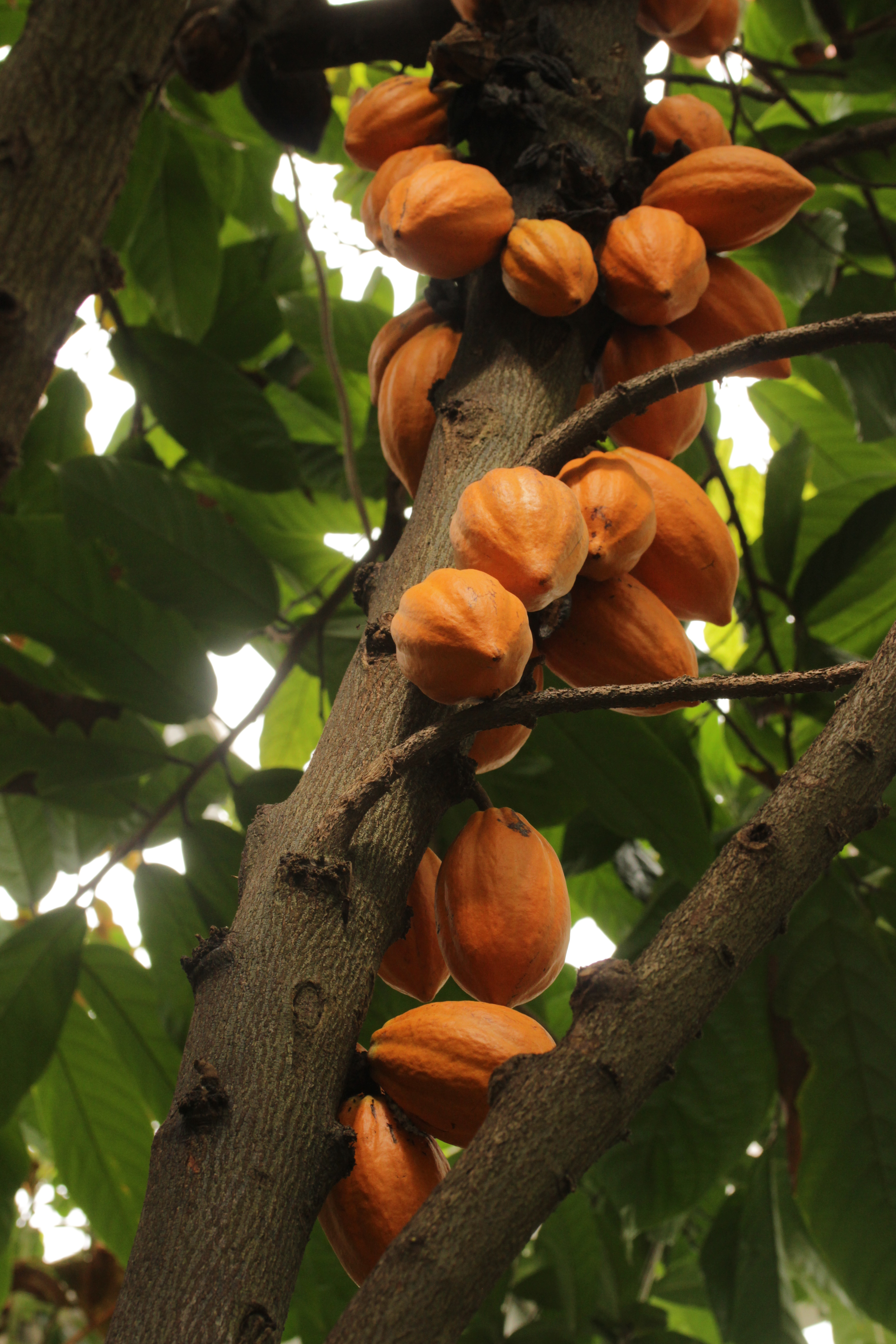
Cacao pods

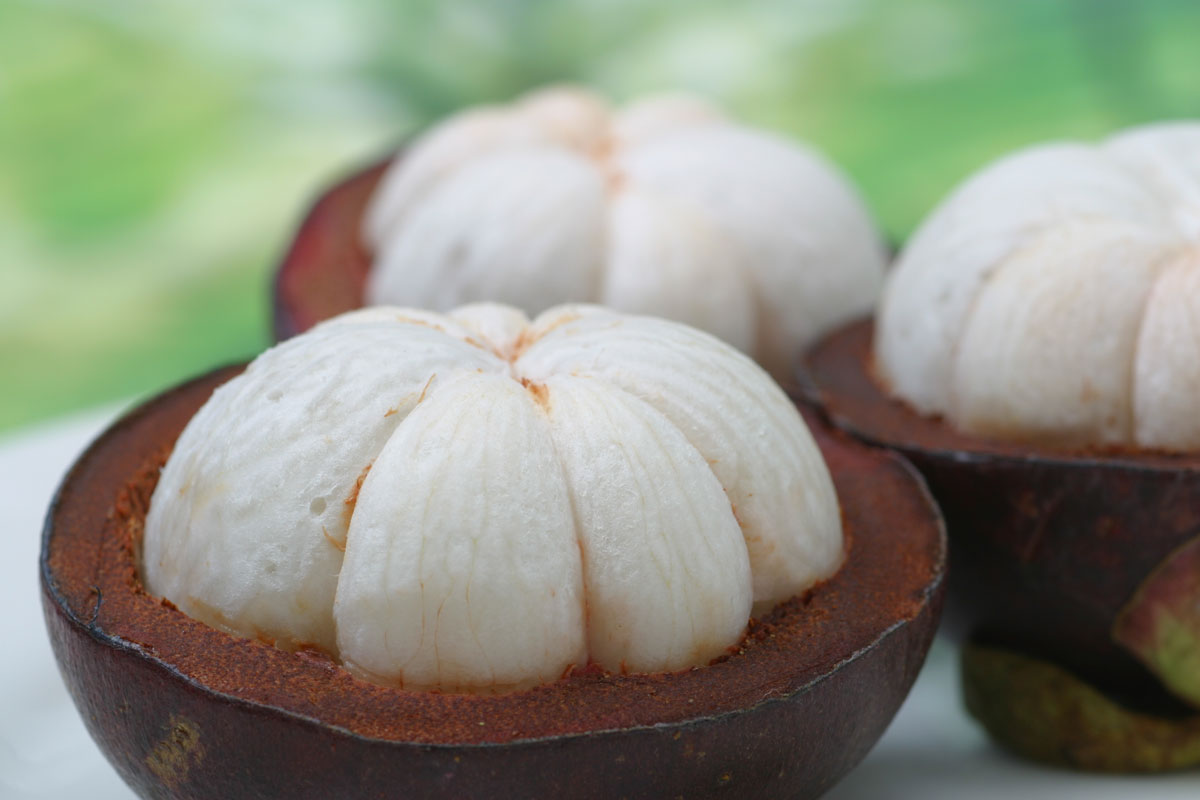
Mangosteens, sliced in a way that exposes the carpels

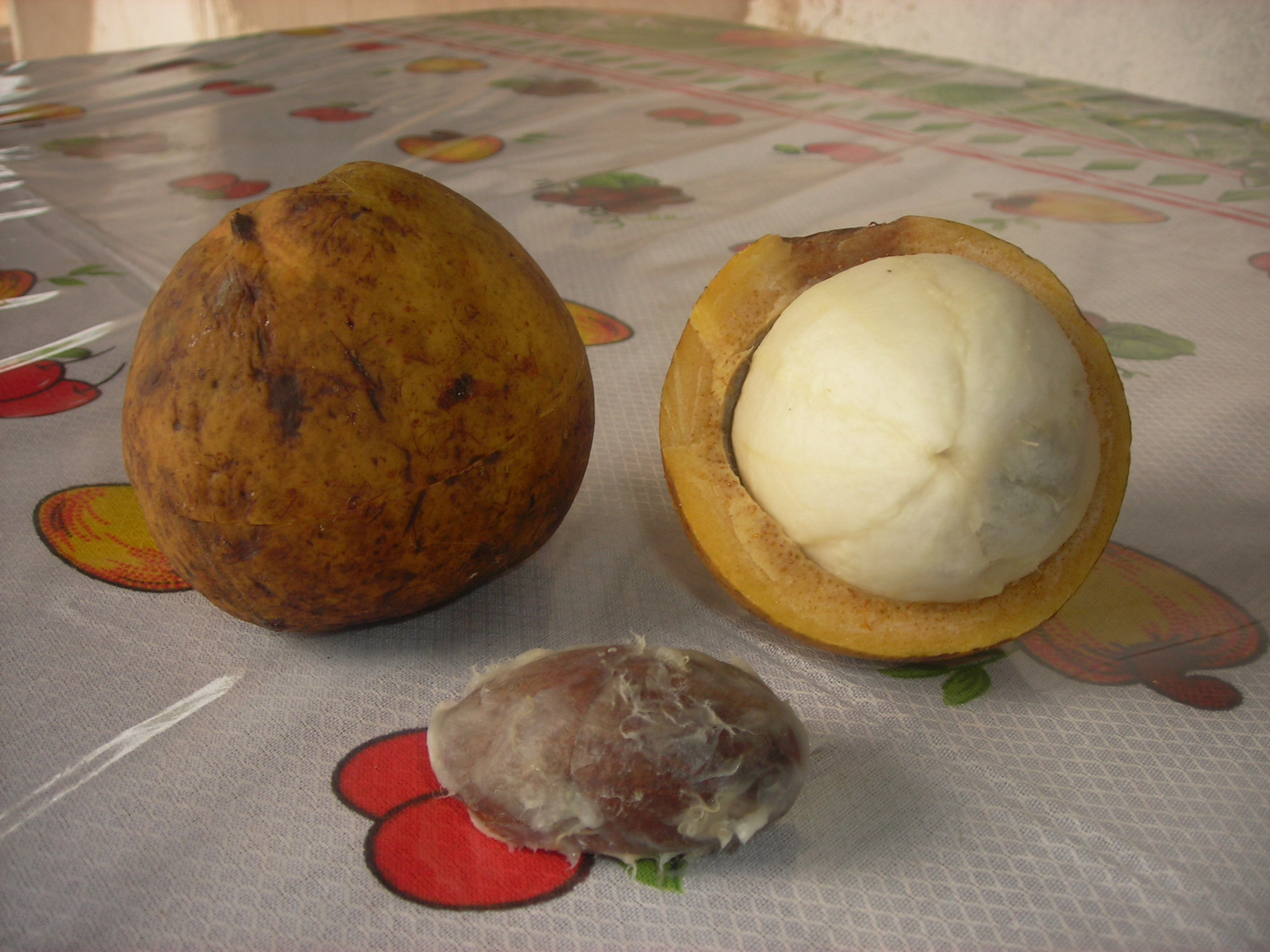
Bacuri

Capsules represent a pod fruit with multiple carpels.

Common name	Species name
Achacha	Garcinia humilis
Ackee	Blighia sapida
Aglaia teysmanniana	Aglaia teysmanniana
Asam gelugur	Garcinia atroviridis
Asam kelubi	Eleiodoxa conferta
Bacupari	Garcinia brasiliensis
Bacuri	Platonia insignis
Bebasajo	Garcinia magnifolia
Belimbing hutan	Baccaurea angulata
Bemange	Cola urceolata
Binukaw	Garcinia binucao
Black apple	Pouteria australis
Blue tongue	Melastoma affine
Boquila	Boquila trifoliolata
Burmese grape	Baccaurea ramiflora
Button mangosteen	Garcinia prainiana
Cacao	Theobroma cacao
Charichuelo	Garcinia madruno
Chocolate vine fruit	Akebia quinata
Copperleaf snowberry	Gaultheria hispida
Courbaril	Hymenaea courbaril
Cowa mangosteen	Garcinia cowa
Cupuaçu	Theobroma grandiflorum
Durian	Durio zibethinus
Eastern teaberry	Gaultheria procumbens
Gấc	Momordica cochinchinensis
Gamboge	Garcinia morella
Garcinia afzelii	Garcinia afzelii
Garcinia costata	Garcinia costata
Isu	Durio oxleyanus
Jentik	Baccaurea polyneura
Keluak	Pangium edule
Kokum	Garcinia indica
Kola nut	Cola nitida
Kundong	Garcinia parvifolia
Langgir	Xanthophyllum amoenum
Langsat	Lansium domesticum
Langsat	Lansium parasiticum
Lardizabala	Lardizabala biternata
Lemon drop mangosteen	Garcinia intermedia
Longoza	Aframomum angustifolium
Luóhàn guǒ	Siraitia grosvenorii
Madan	Garcinia schomburgkiana
Malabar tamarind	Garcinia gummi-gutta
Mangosteen	Garcinia mangostana
Menteng	Baccaurea racemosa
Mo'onia	Garcinia pseudoguttifera
Mountain snowberry	Gaultheria depressa
Mundu	Garcinia dulcis
Pawpaw	Asimina triloba
Rambai	Baccaurea motleyana
Red salak	Salacca affinis
Rose kandis	Garcinia forbesii
Salak	Salacca zalacca
Santol	Sandoricum koetjape
Seashore mangosteen	Garcinia celebica
Small-leaved tamarind	Diploglottis campbellii
Spanish tamarind	Vangueria madagascariensis
Tampoi	Baccaurea macrocarpa
Terengganu cherry	Lepisanthes alata
Toad tree fruit	Tabernaemontana elegans
Trichosanthes beccariana	Trichosanthes beccariana
Utu	Saba senegalensis
Vanilla	Vanilla planifolia
Yantok	Calamus manillensis

== Legumes ==
Legumes represent a pod fruit with one carpel.

Common name	Species name
African locust bean	Parkia biglobosa
Carob	Ceratonia siliqua
Ice-cream bean	Inga edulis
Monkeypod	Pithecellobium dulce
Namu-namu	Cynometra cauliflora
Tamarind	Tamarindus indica
Zig-zag vine fruit	Melodorum leichhardtii

== Follicles ==
Follicles represent a single ovary that splits along a single seam.

Common name	Species name
Angular sea-fig	Carpobrotus glaucescens
Dead man's fingers	Decaisnea fargesii
Karkalla fruit	Carpobrotus rossii
Sour fig	Carpobrotus edulis

== Other accessory fruits ==
Common name	Species name
Cashew apple	Anacardium occidentale

== Plants with edible fruit-like structures ==
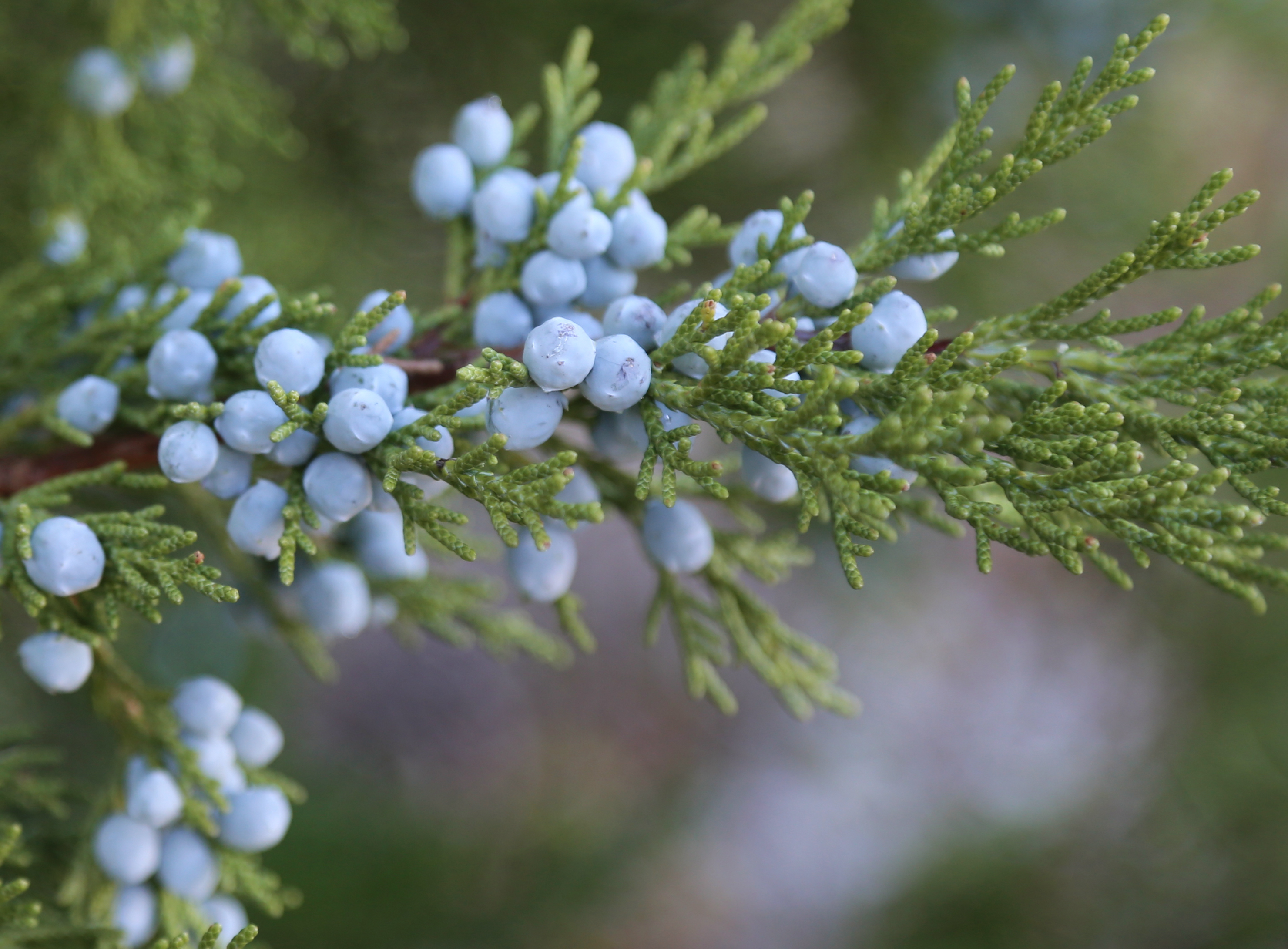
Juniper berries

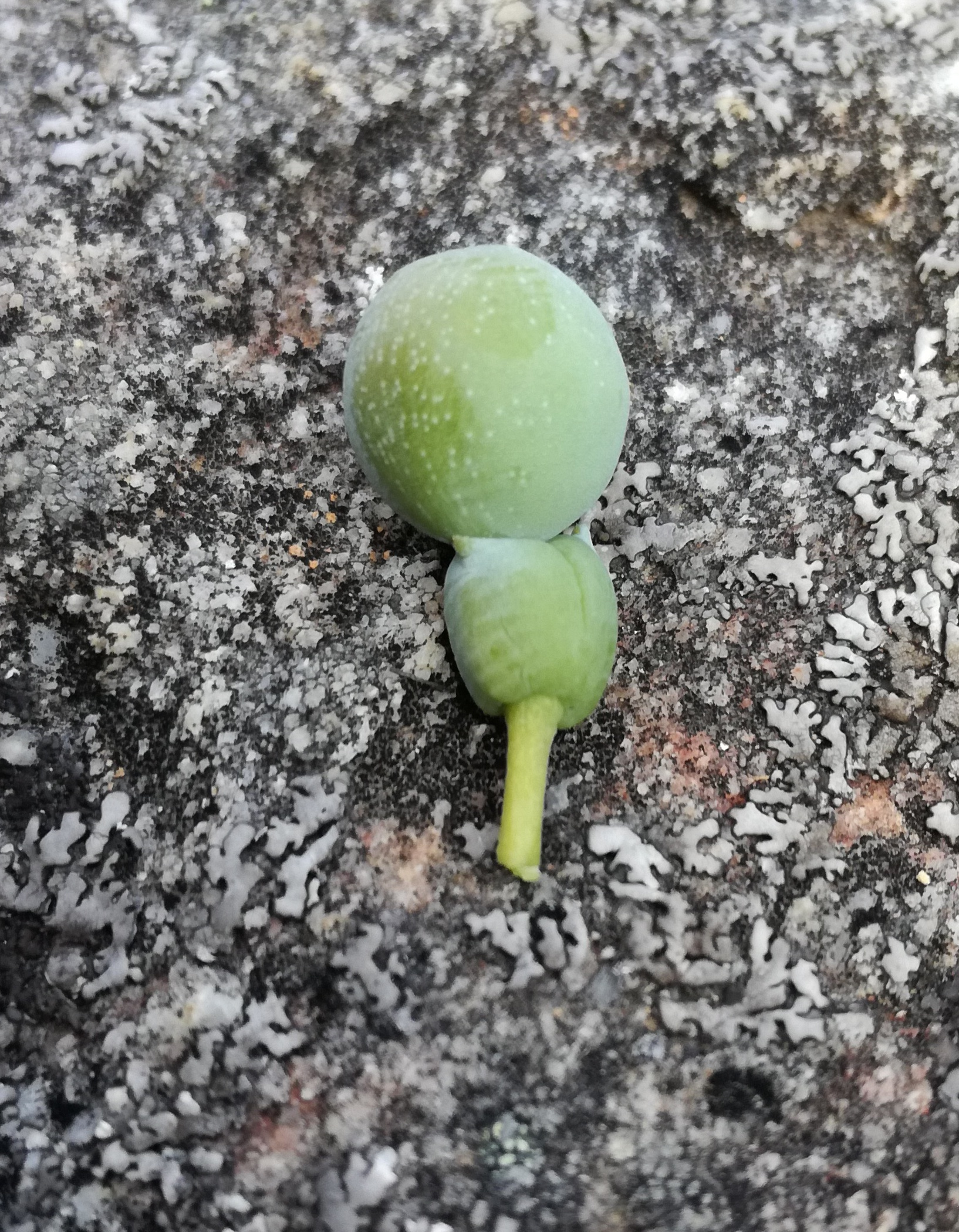
Modified fleshy cone of Podocarpus elongatus

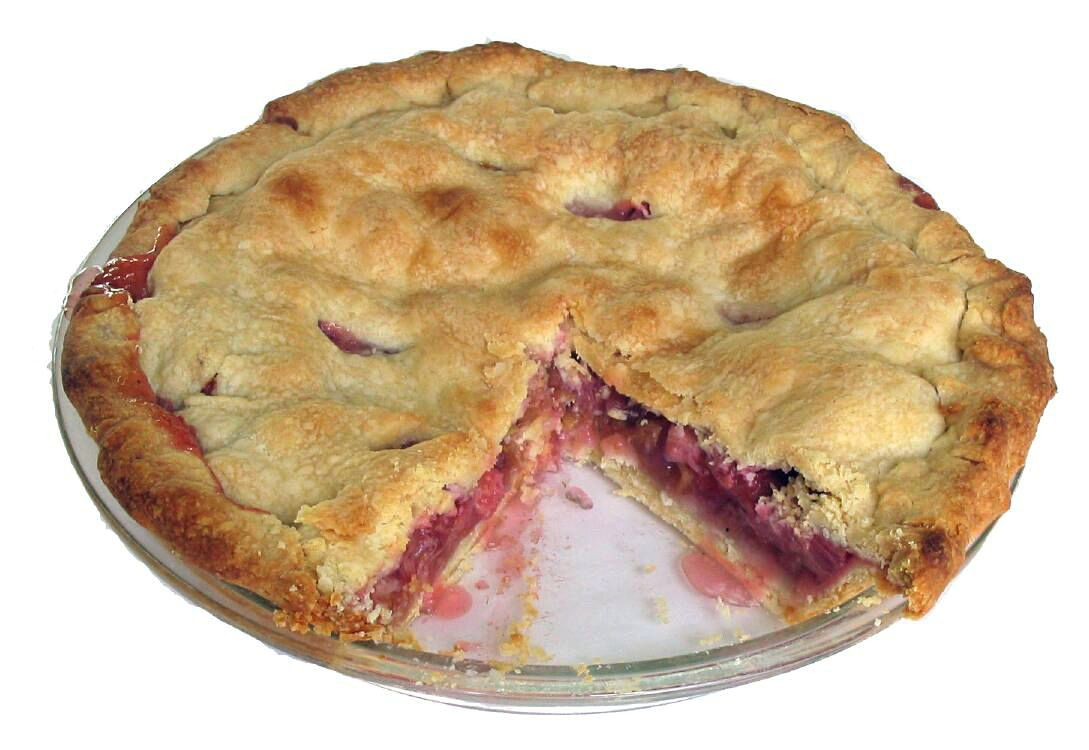
Rhubarb made into rhubarb pie

Plants with edible fruit-like structures are not technically fruit, but are used culinarily as such.

Common name	Species name
Alligator juniper berry	Juniperus deppeana
Arius	Podocarpus costalis
Breede River yellowwood berry	Podocarpus elongatus
Broad-leaved brown pine fruit	Podocarpus dispermus
Broad-leaved yellowwood fruit	Podocarpus latifolius
Brown pine fruit	Podocarpus neriifolius
California juniper berry	Juniperus californica
Chilean plum-yew berry	Prumnopitys andina
Creeping juniper berry	Juniperus horizontalis
Desert juniper berry	Juniperus osteosperma
Dwarf plum pine fruit	Podocarpus spinulosus
East African yellowwood fruit	Podocarpus milanjianus
Ginkgo	Ginkgo biloba
Greek juniper berry	Juniperus excelsa
Himalayan juniper berry	Juniperus recurva
Jícama	Pachyrhizus erosus
Juniper berry	Juniperus communis
Kahikatea	Dacrycarpus dacrydioides
Koolah	Podocarpus drouynianus
Manoao	Manoao colensoi
Mediterranean juniper berry	Juniperus turbinata
Mountain juniper berry	Juniperus monticola
Nageia	Nageia nagi
Native cherry	Exocarpos cupressiformis
One-seed juniper berry	Juniperus monosperma
Pashtun juniper berry	Juniperus seravschanica
Persian juniper berry	Juniperus polycarpos
Phoenicean juniper berry	Juniperus phoenicea
Pinheiro-bravo	Podocarpus lambertii
Plum pine fruit	Podocarpus elatus
Prickly juniper berry	Juniperus oxycedrus
Raisin tree fruit	Hovenia dulcis
Redberry juniper berry	Juniperus coahuilensis
Rhubarb	Rheum × hybridum
Rimu	Dacrydium cupressinum
Rocky Mountain juniper berry	Juniperus scopulorum
Southern juniper berry	Juniperus virginiana var. silicicola
Syrian juniper berry	Juniperus drupacea
Temple juniper berry	Juniperus rigida
Totara	Podocarpus totara
Virginian juniper berry	Juniperus virginiana
Western juniper berry	Juniperus occidentalis
Yew berry	Taxus baccata
Yew plum pine fruit	Podocarpus macrophyllus

== See also ==
- Fruit
- List of fruit dishes
- Fruit tree propagation
- Tropical agriculture
- Tropical fruit
- List of culinary nuts
- List of edible seeds
- List of vegetables
- List of culinary herbs and spices
- List of foods
