= List of exports of Algeria =

Exports of Algeria by product category (2019) Chemical products Transportation Machines Mineral products Plastics and rubbers Metals Foodstuffs Precious metals Textiles Instruments Animal products Vegetable products Paper goods Footwear and headwear Miscellaneous Stone and glass Wood products Animal and vegetable bi-products Animal hides Arts and antiques Weapons

The following is a list of the exports of Algeria.

== Exports ==
The data is for 2012, in billions of United States dollars, as reported by The Observatory of Economic Complexity. Currently the top ten exports are listed.

#	Product	Value
1	Crude petroleum	31,369
2	Petroleum gas	25,702
3	Refined petroleum	10,070
4	Coal tar oil	848
5	Ammonia	613
6	Raw sugar	210
7	Calcium phosphates	183
8	Wheat	84
9	Gas turbines	35
10	Tropical fruits	32
