= Limelon =

Melon variety

A limelon or prity melon is a variety of melon (Cucumis melo) which has a tangy taste like lemon or lime.

The variety was bred in 2015 by a Taiwanese company, Known-You Seed. A Dutch company, HillFresh, has an exclusive contract to grow the variety in Europe and farm it in the Murcia region of Spain. They also import the melon from other countries including Australia, Brazil, Costa Rica and South Africa, to ensure a year-round supply. In the UK, the variety is sold by the retailer, Marks and Spencer.
