= Randia calycina =

Scientific classification
- Kingdom: Plantae
- Clade: Tracheophytes
- Clade: Angiosperms
- Clade: Eudicots
- Clade: Asterids
- Order: Gentianales
- Family: Rubiaceae
- Genus: Randia
- Species: R. calycina

Binomial name
- Randia calycina Cham.

Synonyms
- Basanacantha calycina (Cham.) K.Schum.; Solena calycina (Cham.) D.Dietr.; Basanacantha mucronata Rusby

Species of flowering plant

Randia calycina, also known as esporão-de-galo, is a species of plant in the family Rubiaceae. It is a shrub or tree native to Bolivia and Northeast Brazil.

== Description ==
Randia calycina can grow up to 10 m (33 ft) tall, but can also be shorter and around 3–4 m (10–13 ft). It is dioecious, its flowers may grow solitarily or in inflorescences, and it grows green fruit that ripens to yellow.

== Distribution and habitat ==
Randia calycina prefers wet, tropical biomes. It grows in forests.
