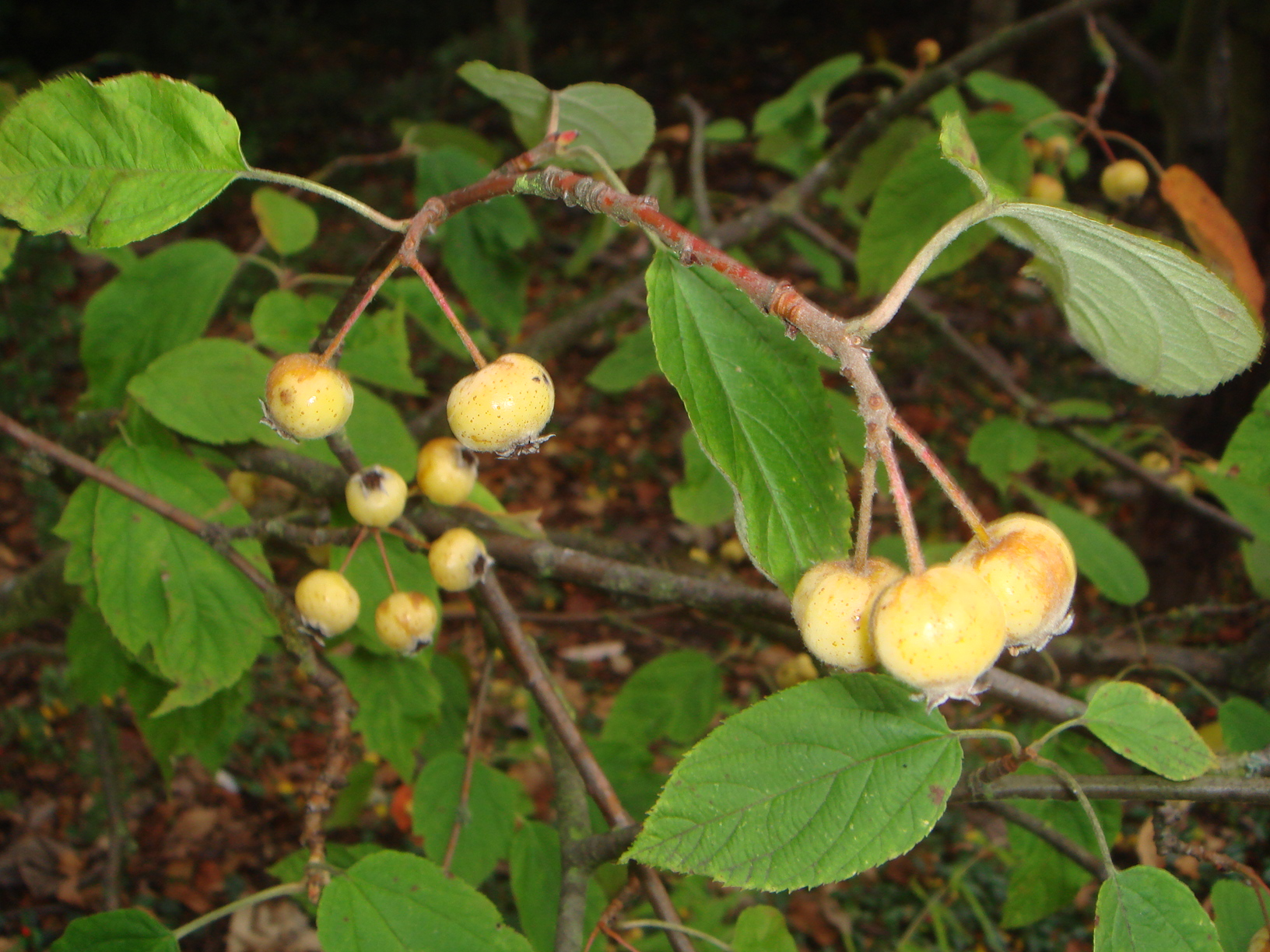

Scientific classification
- Kingdom: Plantae
- Clade: Tracheophytes
- Clade: Angiosperms
- Clade: Eudicots
- Clade: Rosids
- Order: Rosales
- Family: Rosaceae
- Genus: Malus
- Species: M. yunnanensis

Binomial name
- Malus yunnanensis C.K.Schneid.

= Malus yunnanensis =

Species of apple tree

Malus yunnanensis is a species in the genus Malus, family Rosaceae, with the common name Yunnan crabapple. In Mandarin Chinese, it is called “滇池海棠” (Diānchí hǎitáng).

The tree bears single white flowers with a light pink tint, fruit color is red with white dots, moderate texture and roundish form.
