= Chinese crab apple =

Chinese crab apple is a common name for several plants and may refer to:

- Malus baccata
- Malus hupehensis
- Malus prunifolia, native to China
- Malus spectabilis
