= Cut-leaf crabapple =

Cut-leaf crabapple is a common name for several plants and may refer to:

- Malus toringoides
- Malus transitoria, native to China
