= Malus × atrosanguinea =

- Flowers
- Leaves of the 'Gorgeous' cultivar

Scientific classification
- Kingdom: Plantae
- Clade: Tracheophytes
- Clade: Angiosperms
- Clade: Eudicots
- Clade: Rosids
- Order: Rosales
- Family: Rosaceae
- Genus: Malus
- Species: M. × atrosanguinea

Binomial name
- Malus × atrosanguinea (Späth) C.K.Schneid.

Synonyms
- Pyrus × atrosanguinea Späth

Species of plant

Malus × atrosanguinea, the carmine crabapple, is an artificial hybrid species of flowering plant in the family Rosaceae. Its parents, with considerable uncertainty, are Malus halliana (or M. fusca) and M. sieboldii. It is a small tree reaching 6 m (20 ft), with carmine flower buds and pink flowers. In the past this hybrid was quite popular on "both sides of the Atlantic", and was available in European nurseries before 1889, when it was sent to the Arnold Arboretum in Boston.

Its cultivar 'Gorgeous', with its white flowers, pink flower buds and rounded crown, has gained the Royal Horticultural Society's Award of Garden Merit as an ornamental. 'Gorgeous', which was developed independently, may not have the same parentage as other crabs identified as Malus × atrosanguinea.
