= Chinese apple =

Chinese apple is a name used for several fruits :

- Citrus × sinensis, the orange, is referred to as Chinese apple in Dutch, sinaasappel or appelsien, Swedish apelsin, Finnish appelsiini, Danish and Norwegian appelsin, Icelandic appelsína, Lithuanian apelsinas, and sometimes German Apfelsine.
- Malus prunifolia, a species in the apple genus (Malus) native to China, used as in breeding and sometimes cultivated for its fruit
- Punica granatum (pomegranate) sometimes called Chinese apple in British English
- Syzygium luehmannii (riberry) sometimes called Chinese apple in Australian English
- Ziziphus jujuba is referred to as Chinese apple in Vietnamese, táo tàu, or simply táo.
