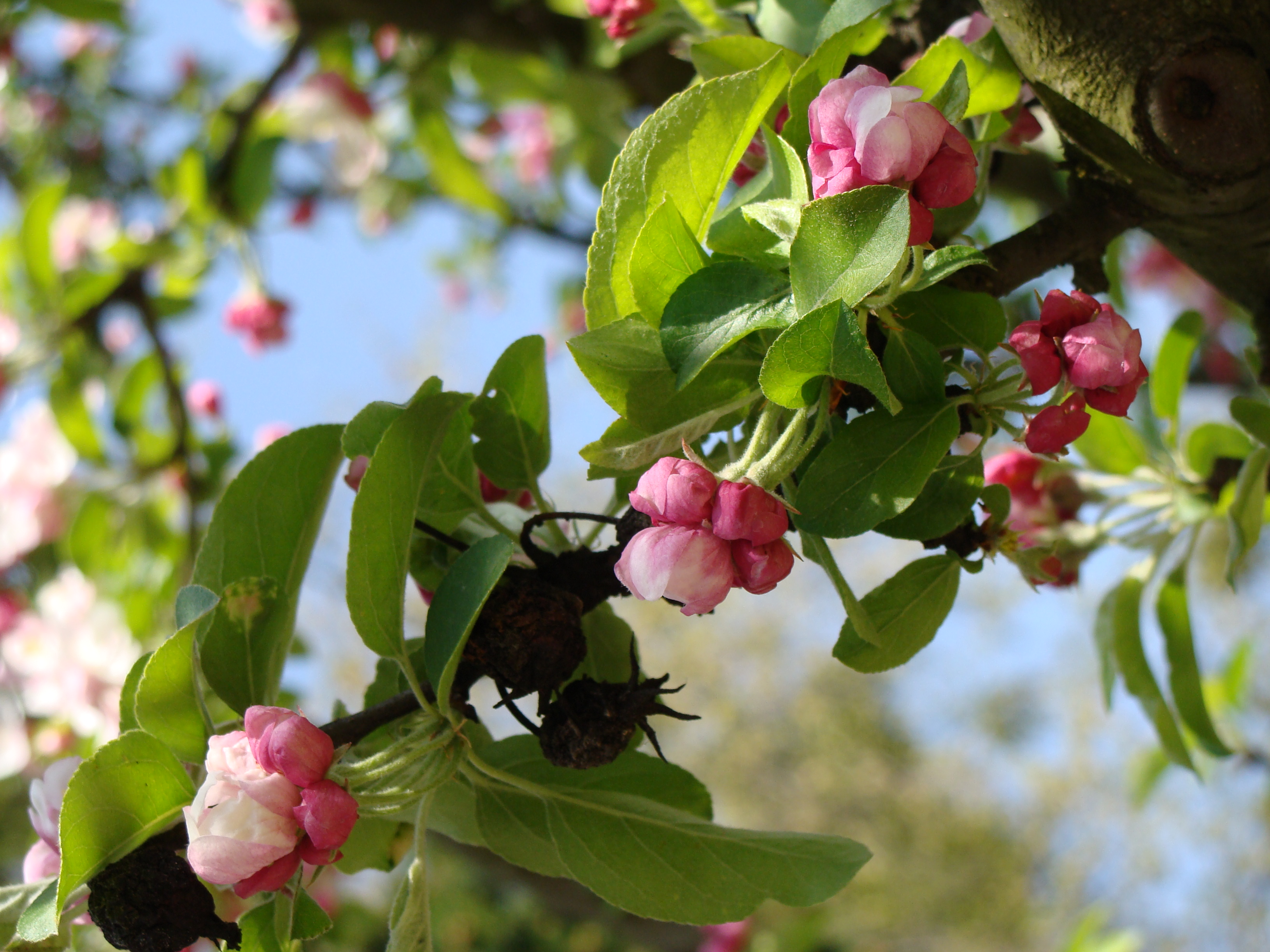
- Flowers and leaves
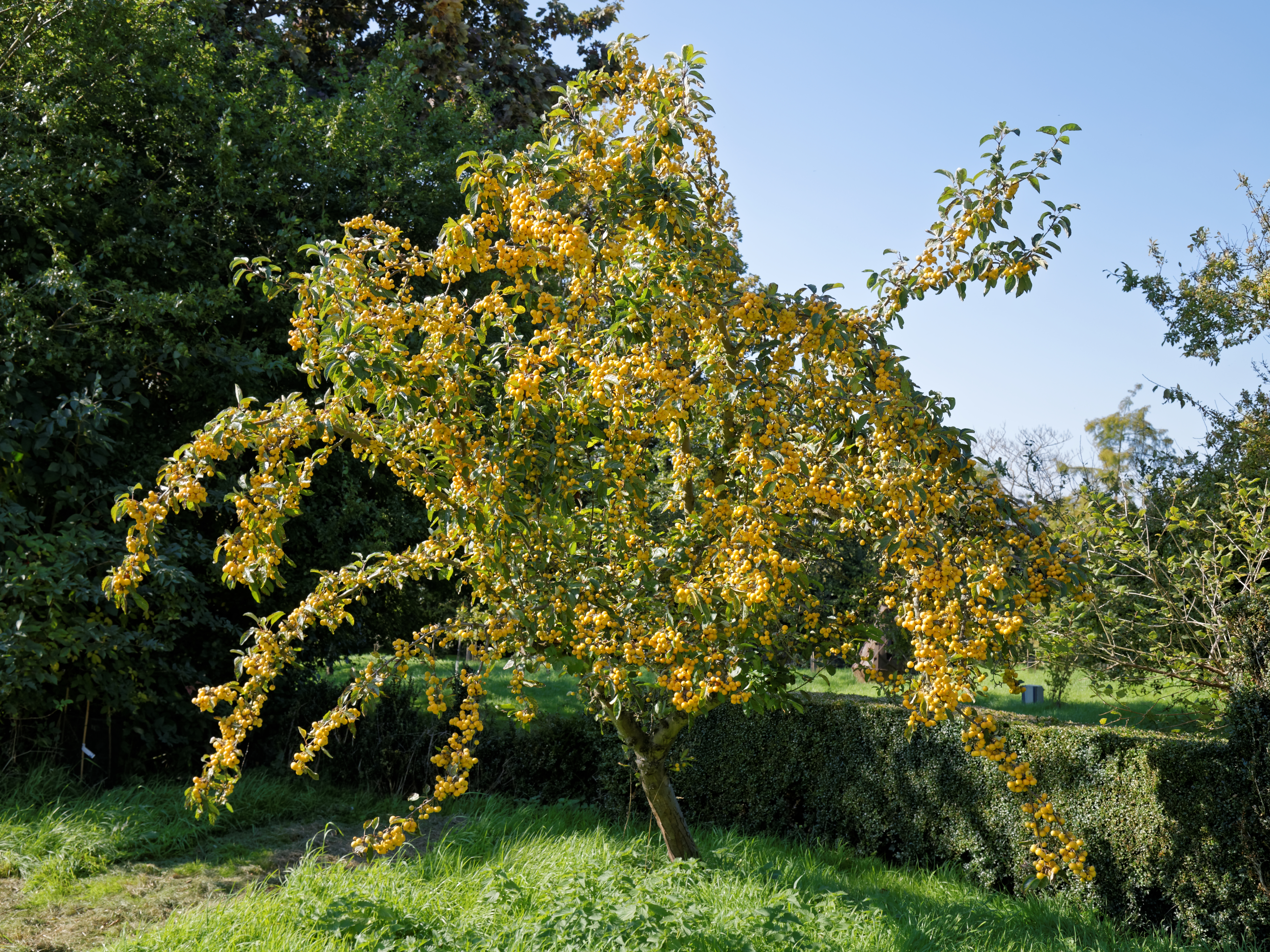
- 'Golden Hornet' cultivar laden with fruit

Scientific classification
- Kingdom: Plantae
- Clade: Embryophytes
- Clade: Tracheophytes
- Clade: Angiosperms
- Clade: Eudicots
- Clade: Rosids
- Order: Rosales
- Family: Rosaceae
- Genus: Malus
- Species: M. × zumi

Binomial name
- Malus × zumi (Matsum.) Rehder

Synonyms
- Malus toringo var. zumi (Matsum.) H.Hara; Pyrus × zumi Matsum.

= Malus × zumi =

Hybrid species of flowering plant

Malus × zumi (or Malus zumi) is a naturally occurring hybrid species of crabapple in the family Rosaceae, native to Japan, and a garden escapee in the US state of Ohio. Its parents are the Manchurian crab apple Malus mandshurica and Siebold's crabapple Malus sieboldii. It is used as a salt‑tolerant rootstock for apples, Malus domestica, as it can survive NaCl concentrations up to 0.6%. A number of ornamental cultivars are available, including 'Golden Hornet' and 'Professor Sprenger'.
