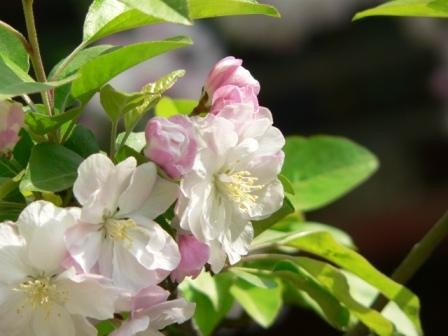

Scientific classification
- Kingdom: Plantae
- Clade: Tracheophytes
- Clade: Angiosperms
- Clade: Eudicots
- Clade: Rosids
- Order: Rosales
- Family: Rosaceae
- Genus: Malus
- Species: M. × kaido

Binomial name
- Malus × kaido (Wenz.) Pardé (1906)

Synonyms
- Malus domestica var. micromalus (Makino) Likhonos (1974); Malus × kaido K.Koch (1869), not validly publ.; Malus microcarpa var. kaido (Wenz.) Carrière (1883); Malus × micromalus Makino (1908); Malus spectabilis var. kaido (Wenz.) Carrière (1874); Malus spectabilis var. micromalus Koidz. (1913), pro syn.; Pyrus × kaido (Wenz.) Mouill. (1893); Pyrus × micromalus (Makino) L.H.Bailey (1916); Pyrus ringo var. kaido Wenz. (1873)

= Malus × kaido =

Hybrid species of apple tree

Malus × kaido, the midget crab apple or Kaido crab apple, is a hybrid species of genus Malus in the rose family, Rosaceae. It is a naturally occurring hybrid of Malus baccata and M. spectabilis. It is native to north-central and northeastern China.
