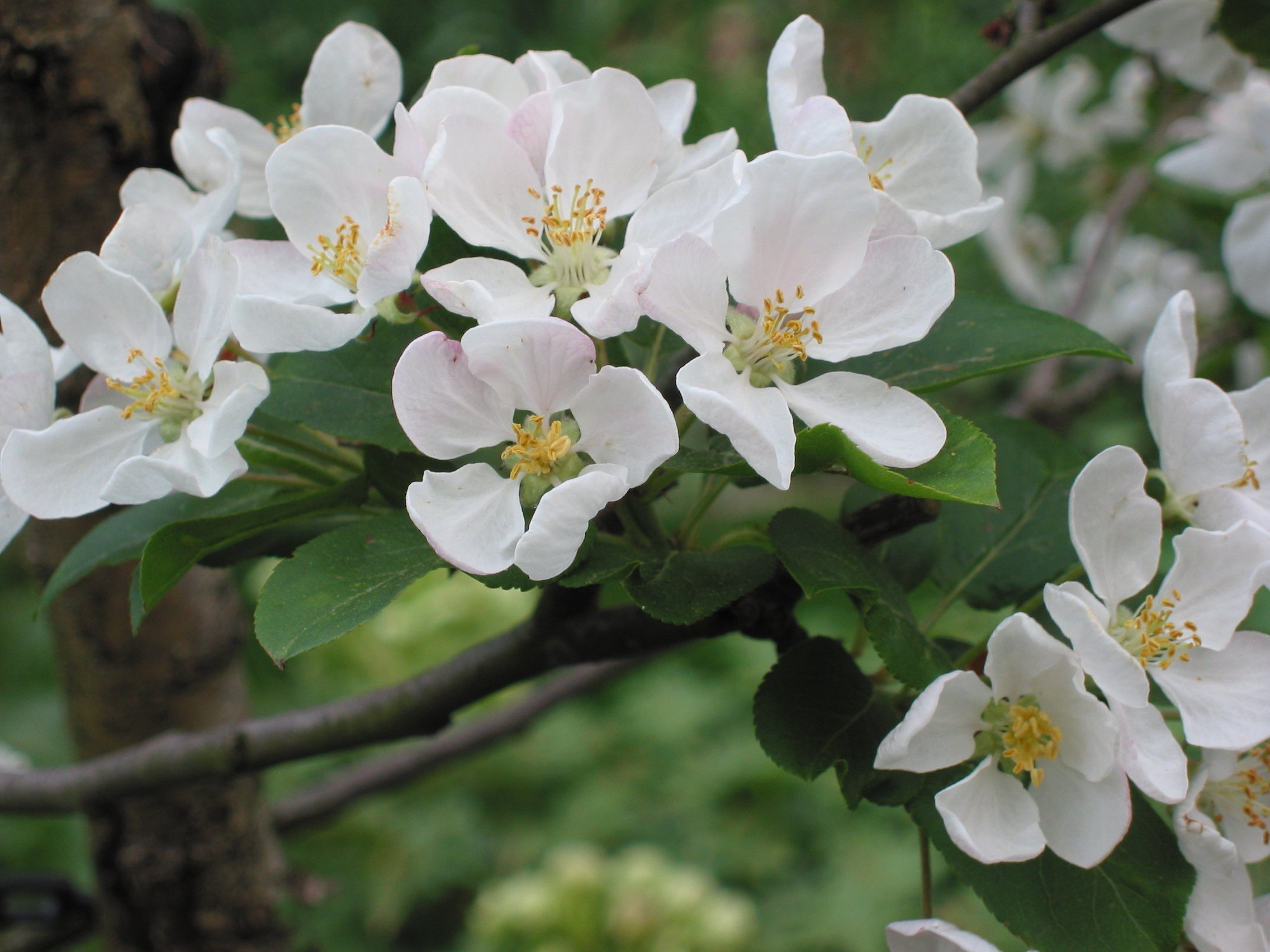
- Flowers
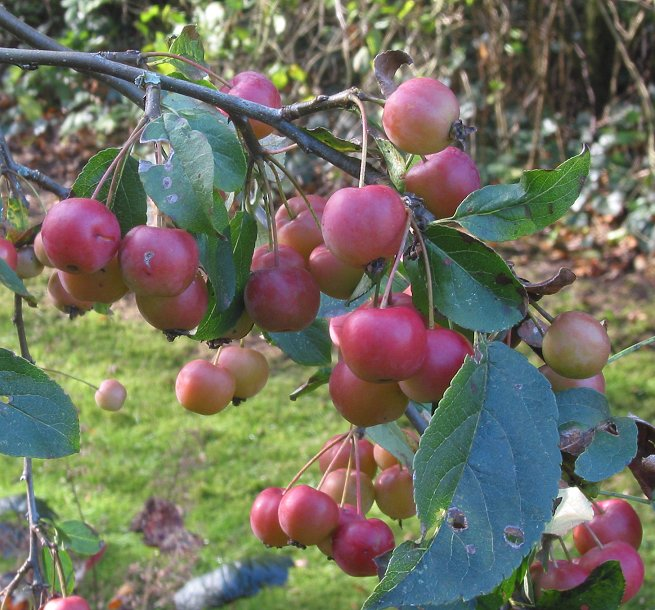
- 'Red Sentinel' cultivar fruit

Scientific classification
- Kingdom: Plantae
- Clade: Tracheophytes
- Clade: Angiosperms
- Clade: Eudicots
- Clade: Rosids
- Order: Rosales
- Family: Rosaceae
- Genus: Malus
- Species: M. × robusta

Binomial name
- Malus × robusta (Carrière) Rehder

Synonyms
- Pyrus × robusta (Carrière) M.F.Fay & Christenh.

= Malus × robusta =

Hybrid species of flowering plant

Malus × robusta, called Siberian crab apple along with other members of its genus, is a hybrid species of flowering plant in the family Rosaceae. It is the result of a cross between Malus baccata (Siberian crab apple) and Malus prunifolia (plum-leaved crab apple). It is being studied for its resistance potential to fire blight. Known for its attractive fruit that remain on the tree well into winter, its cultivar 'Red Sentinel' has gained the Royal Horticultural Society's Award of Garden Merit as an ornamental.
