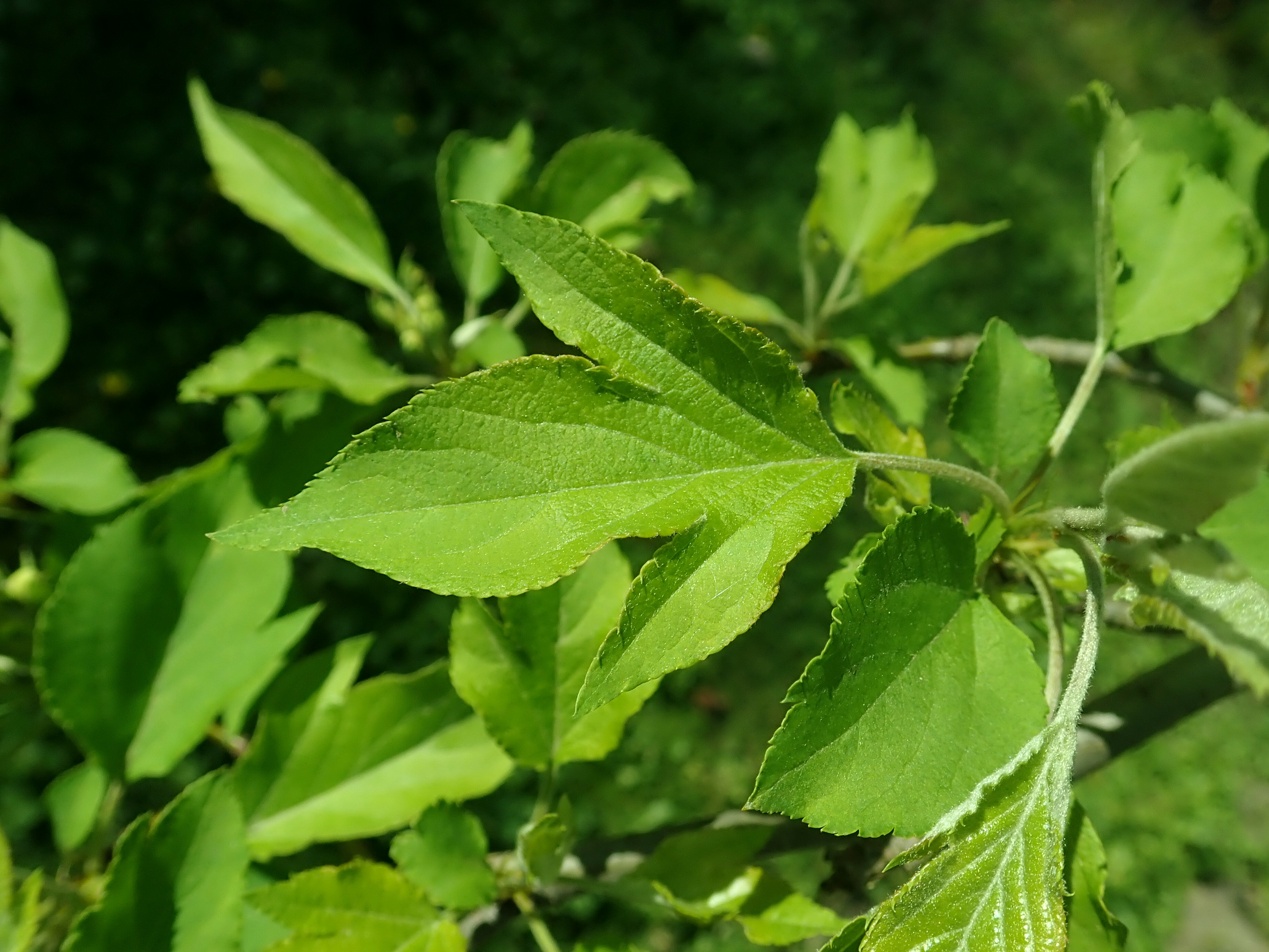

Conservation status
- Data Deficient (IUCN 3.1)

Scientific classification
- Kingdom: Plantae
- Clade: Tracheophytes
- Clade: Angiosperms
- Clade: Eudicots
- Clade: Rosids
- Order: Rosales
- Family: Rosaceae
- Genus: Malus
- Species: M. kansuensis

Binomial name
- Malus kansuensis (Batalin) C.K.Schneid.

= Malus kansuensis =

Species of apple tree

Malus kansuensis is a species in the genus Malus in the family Rosaceae, called with the common name Calva crabapple. A tree of this variety would produce a yellow fruit in the size a half an inch. The white flowers are about 2 inches across.
