= Malus komarovii =

Conservation status
- Endangered (IUCN 3.1)

Scientific classification
- Kingdom: Plantae
- Clade: Tracheophytes
- Clade: Angiosperms
- Clade: Eudicots
- Clade: Rosids
- Order: Rosales
- Family: Rosaceae
- Genus: Malus
- Species: M. komarovii

Binomial name
- Malus komarovii (Sarg.) Rehder

Species of plant

Malus komarovii is an apple species of flowering plant, in the family Rosaceae.

It is native to China, Manchuria, and North Korea.

== Conservation ==
Malus komarovii is threatened by habitat loss, and is on the IUCN Red List.
