= Malus indica =

Scientific classification
- Kingdom: Plantae
- Clade: Tracheophytes
- Clade: Angiosperms
- Clade: Eudicots
- Clade: Rosids
- Order: Rosales
- Family: Rosaceae
- Genus: Malus
- Species: M. indica

Binomial name
- Malus indica (Wall.) B.B.Liu

Synonyms
- Cydonia indica (Wall.) Spach; Docynia delavayi Rehder, nom. illeg. homonym. post.; Docynia docynioides (C.K.Schneid.) Rehder; Docynia griffithiana Decne.; Docynia hookeriana Decne.; Docynia indica var. griffithiana (Decne.) Ghora; Docynia indica (Wall.) Decne.; Docynia rufifolia (H.Lév.) Rehder; Malus docynioides C.K.Schneid.; Pyrus indica Wall.; Pyrus nepalensis Lodd. ex Jacques, nom. illeg. superfl.; Pyrus rufifolia H.Lév.

Species of plant

Malus indica is a tree species belonging to the family Rosaceae, with native ranges stretching from Nepal to south-central and Indo-China.

== Taxonomy ==
The species was first described in 1831 as Pyrus indica. However, this was an illegitimate name because it had already been published in 1825 for a different species. After being placed in the genera Cydonia and Docynia, it was transferred to Malus in 2023 when Docynia was sunk into Malus.
