= Malus honanensis =

Conservation status
- Data Deficient (IUCN 3.1)

Scientific classification
- Kingdom: Plantae
- Clade: Embryophytes
- Clade: Tracheophytes
- Clade: Angiosperms
- Clade: Eudicots
- Clade: Rosids
- Order: Rosales
- Family: Rosaceae
- Genus: Malus
- Species: M. honanensis

Binomial name
- Malus honanensis Rehder

Species of apple tree

Malus honanensis is a wild species in the genus Malus (mostly referred for the crabapple or wild apple), in the family Rosaceae, with no established common name, and used as rootstock for the domesticated apple.
