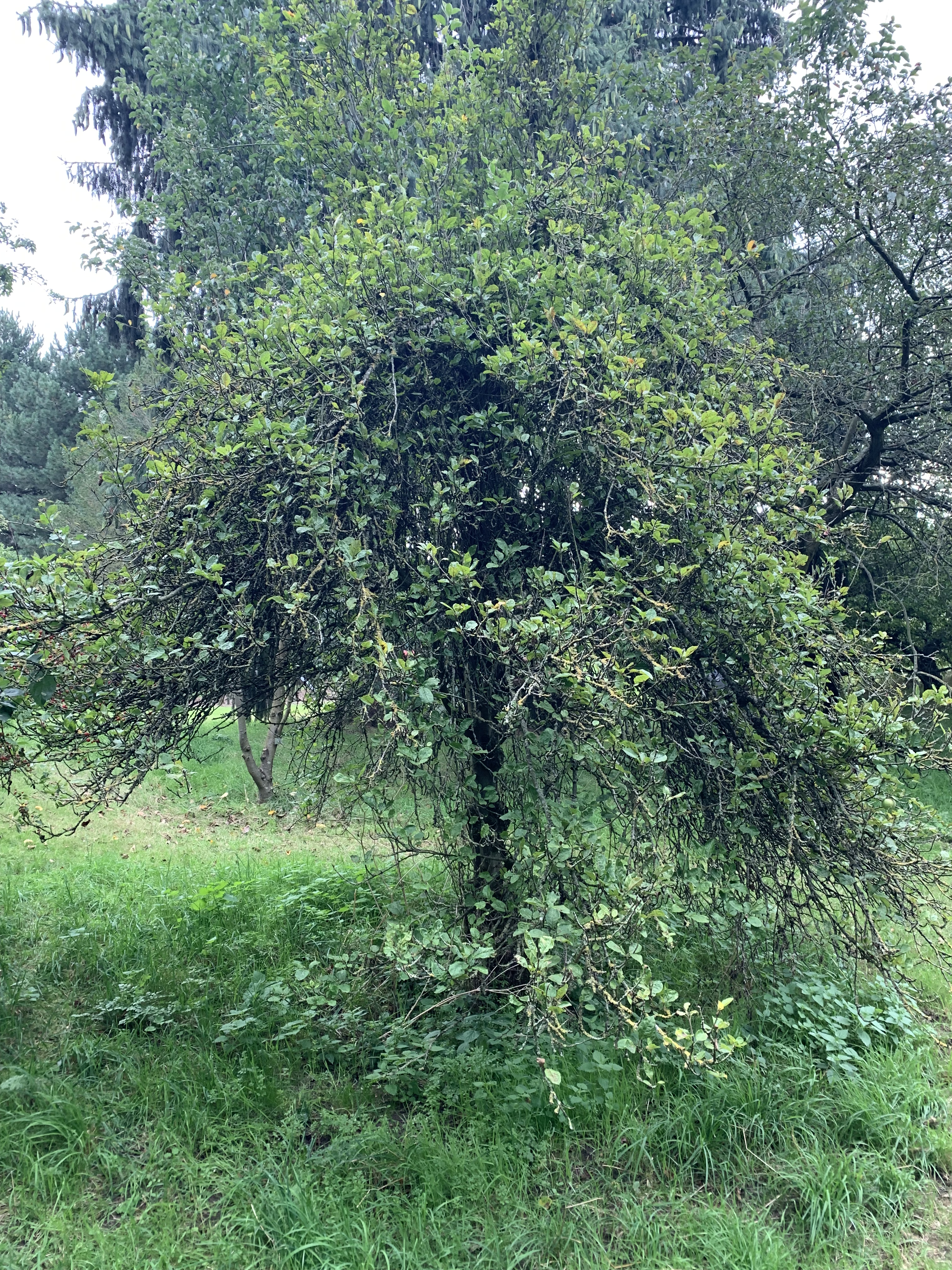

Scientific classification
- Kingdom: Plantae
- Clade: Tracheophytes
- Clade: Angiosperms
- Clade: Eudicots
- Clade: Rosids
- Order: Rosales
- Family: Rosaceae
- Genus: Malus
- Species: M. brevipes

Binomial name
- Malus brevipes Rehder

= Malus brevipes =

Species of apple tree

Malus brevipes, with the common name shrub apple, is a species of crabapple in the genus Malus, in the family Rosaceae.

It is only known as a cultivated garden variety, its original native location of distribution is unknown. Kew Gardens and Montreal Botanical Garden are amongst over 20 botanic gardens that are known to have living specimens of the shrub apple.
