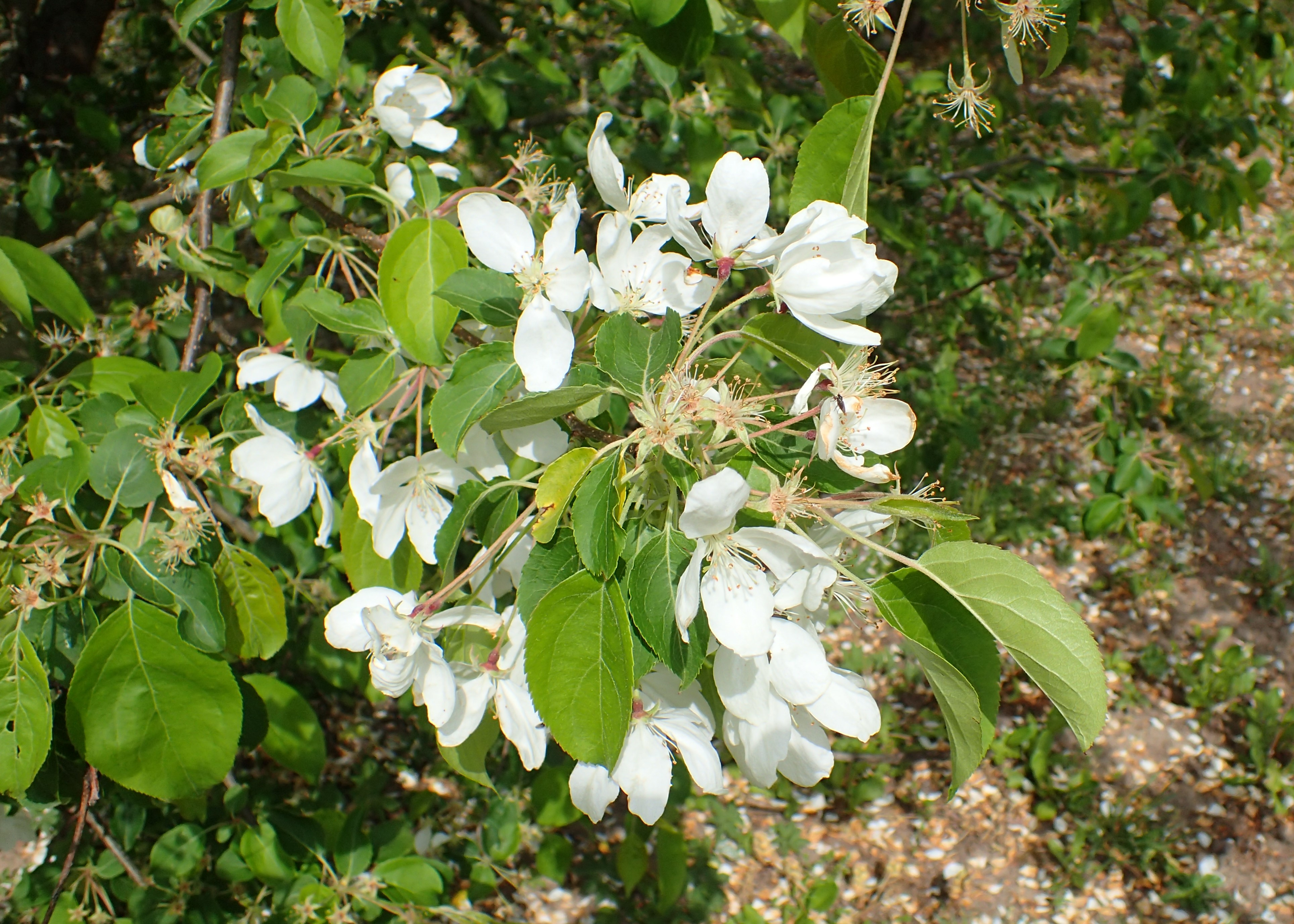

Conservation status
- Least Concern (IUCN 3.1)

Scientific classification
- Kingdom: Plantae
- Clade: Tracheophytes
- Clade: Angiosperms
- Clade: Eudicots
- Clade: Rosids
- Order: Rosales
- Family: Rosaceae
- Genus: Malus
- Species: M. rockii

Binomial name
- Malus rockii Rehder

Synonyms
- Malus baccata subsp. himalaica (Maximowicz) Likhonos; M. baccata var. himalaica (Maximowicz) C. K. Schneider; Pyrus baccata var. himalaica Maximowicz

= Malus rockii =

Species of apple tree

Malus rockii is a crabapple species in the family Rosaceae. It is native to China and Bhutan.

Some subspecies of the Siberian crab apple (Malus baccata) are considered synonymous with this species.
