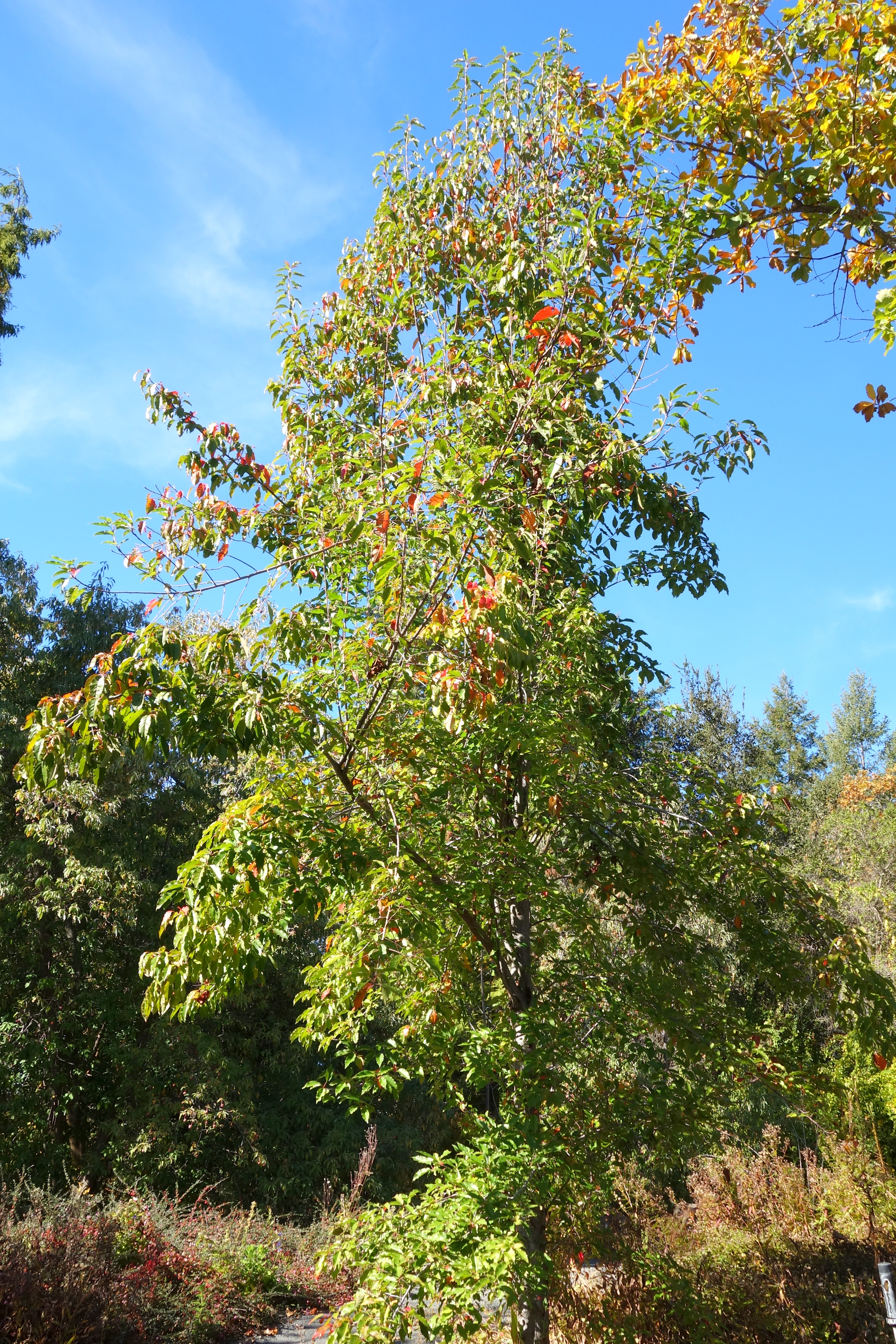

Conservation status
- Data Deficient (IUCN 3.1)

Scientific classification
- Kingdom: Plantae
- Clade: Embryophytes
- Clade: Tracheophytes
- Clade: Angiosperms
- Clade: Eudicots
- Clade: Rosids
- Order: Rosales
- Family: Rosaceae
- Genus: Malus
- Species: M. doumeri

Binomial name
- Malus doumeri A.Chev.

Synonyms
- Docynia doumeri (Bois) C.K.Schneid.; Eriolobus doumeri (Bois) C.K.Schneid.; Malus formosana Kawak. & Koidz.; Malus laosensis (Cardot) A.Chev.; Pyrus doumeri Bois; Pyrus formosana Kawak. & Koidz. ex Hayata; Pyrus laosensis Cardot; Pyrus melliana Hand.-Mazz.

= Malus doumeri =

Species of apple tree

Malus doumeri is a species in the genus Malus in the family Rosaceae, that resembles Docynia and has been placed in that genus in the past. It is native to temperate and tropical Asia. The fruit is edible.

It is also called with the common name Taiwan crabapple, and its extracts have been evaluated for their potential use in skin care.
