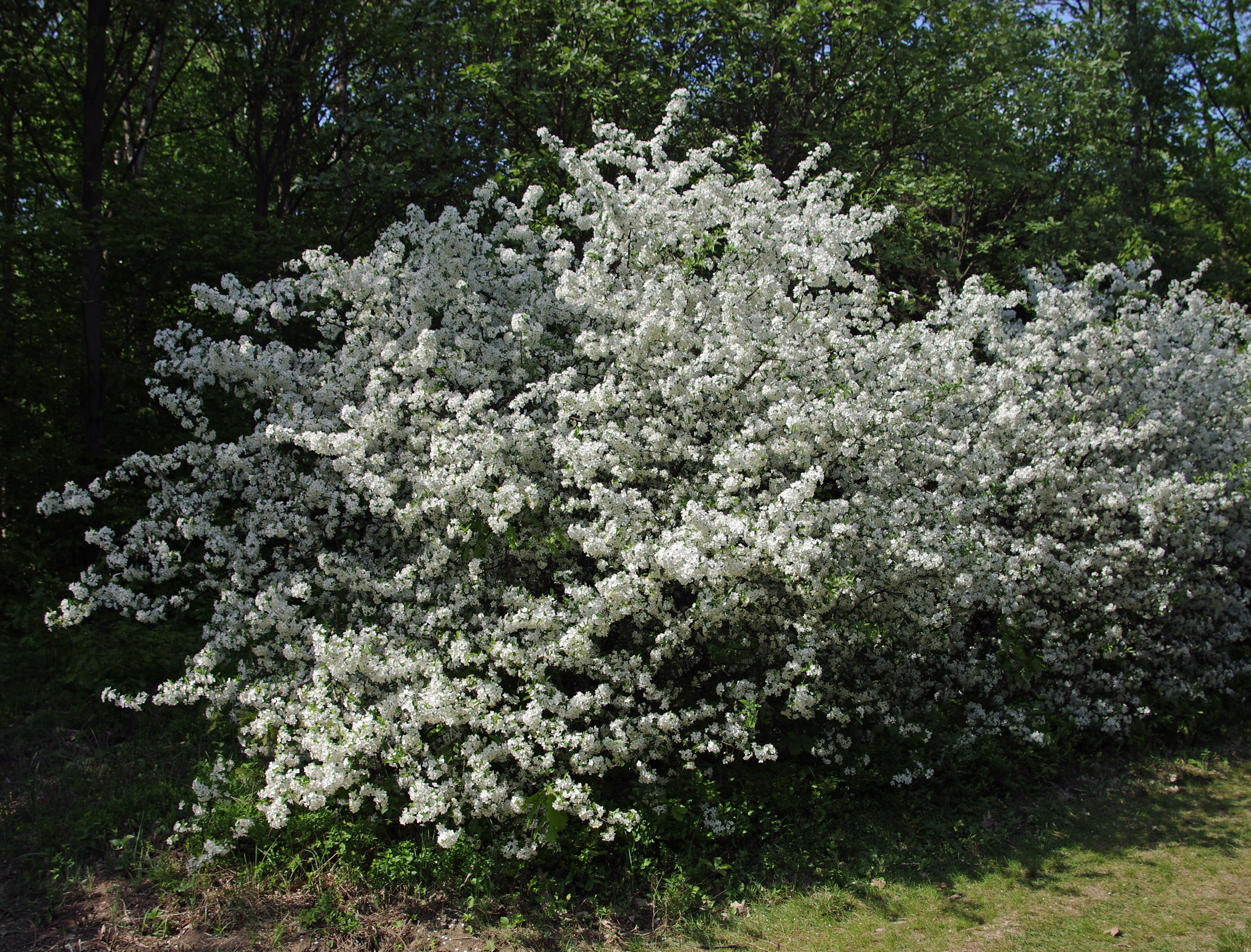
- A hedge of Malus sargentii in bloom

Scientific classification
- Kingdom: Plantae
- Clade: Tracheophytes
- Clade: Angiosperms
- Clade: Eudicots
- Clade: Rosids
- Order: Rosales
- Family: Rosaceae
- Genus: Malus
- Species: M. sargentii

Binomial name
- Malus sargentii Rehder

= Malus sargentii =

Species of apple tree

Malus sargentii, the Sargent crabapple or Sargent's apple, is a species of flowering plant in the genus Malus of the family Rosaceae. The species was formerly considered a variety of the species Malus sieboldii. It is a shrub or small tree growing to 6–10 ft (1.8–3.0 m) tall and 6–12 ft (1.8–3.7 m) broad.

Malus sargentii is native to Japan but is commonly used as an attractive compact ornamental shrub elsewhere. Every other year it bears masses of pink buds opening to fragrant white blossom. In the autumn, many small red globose fruits appear, persisting on the tree until winter.

== Images ==
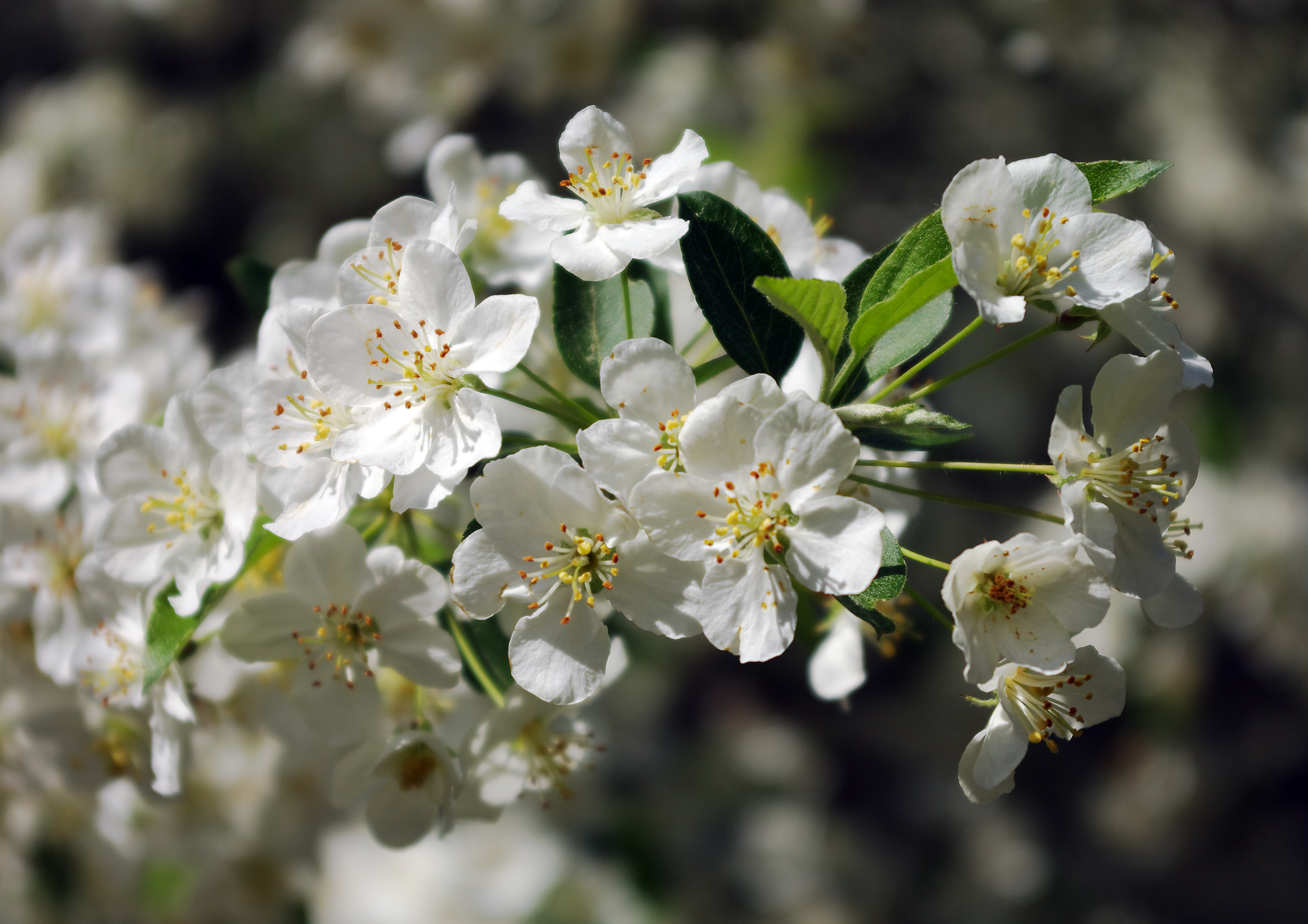

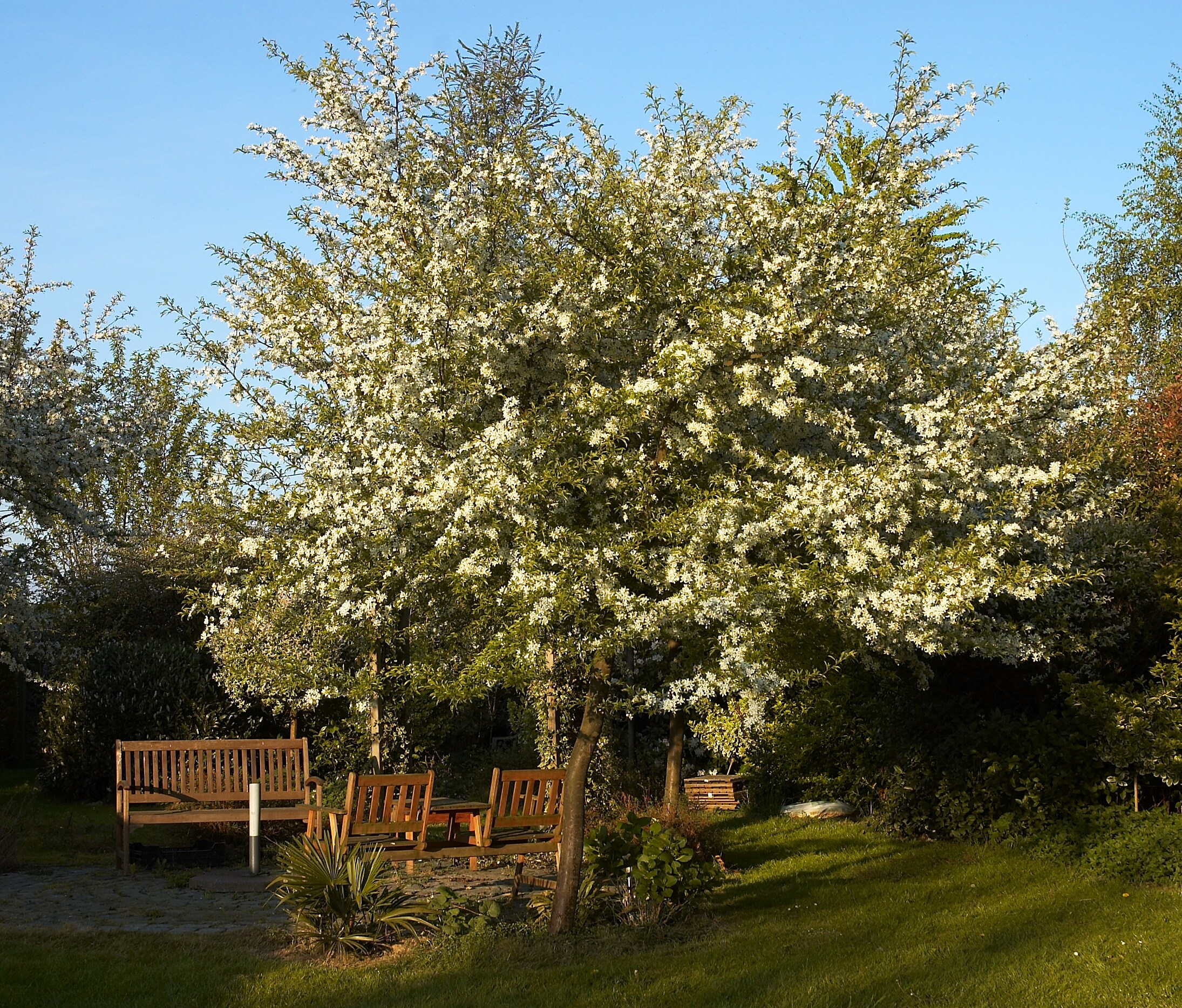

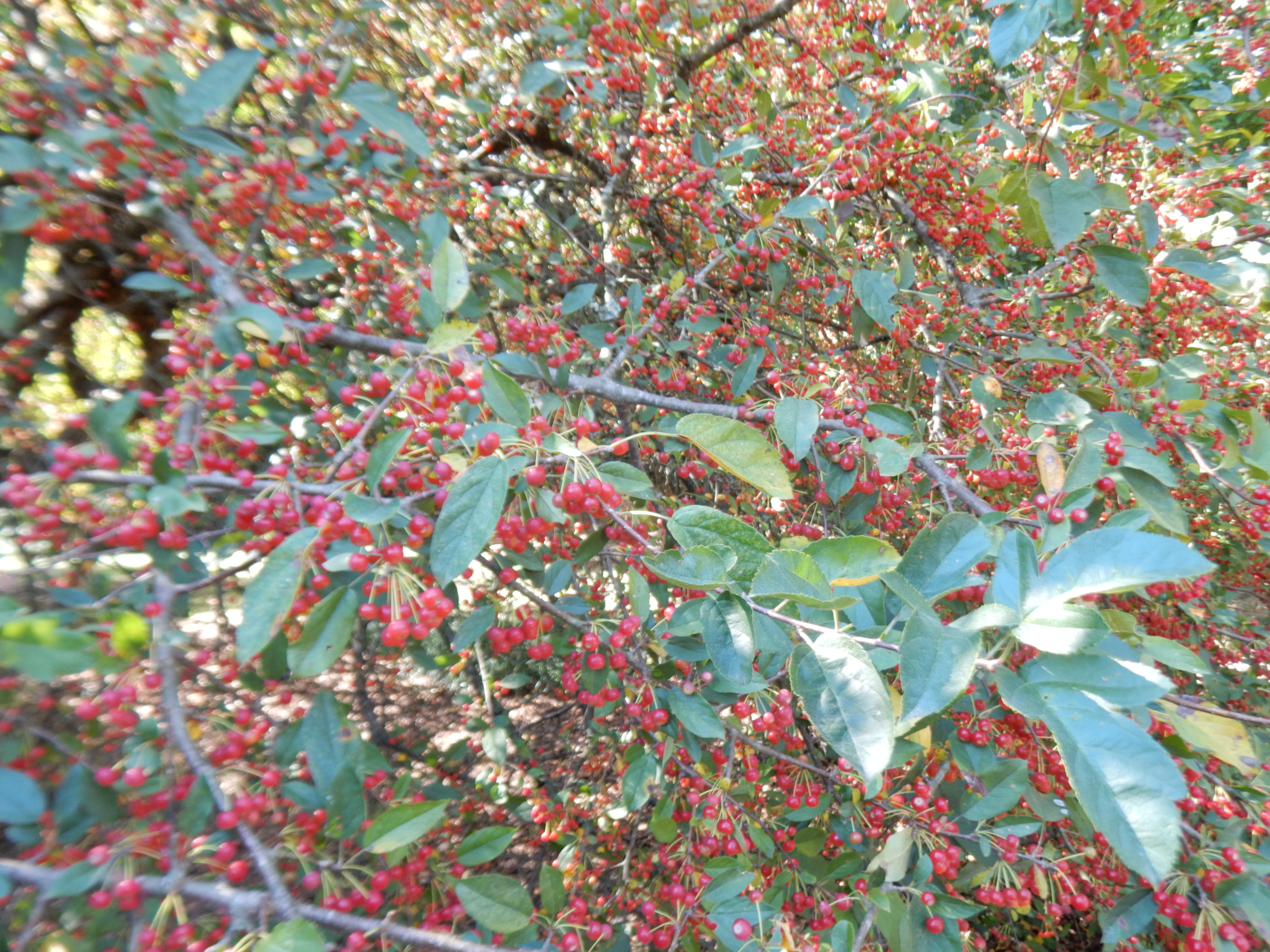
