= Malus × sublobata =

Scientific classification
- Kingdom: Plantae
- Clade: Tracheophytes
- Clade: Angiosperms
- Clade: Eudicots
- Clade: Rosids
- Order: Rosales
- Family: Rosaceae
- Genus: Malus
- Species: M. × sublobata

Binomial name
- Malus × sublobata Rehder

Species of apple tree

Malus × sublobata is the botanical name for the yellow autumn crabapple. It is a species of the genus malus in the family Rosaceae, native to Japan.

This tree produces blossoms of pink and white coloration, and yellow fruit.
