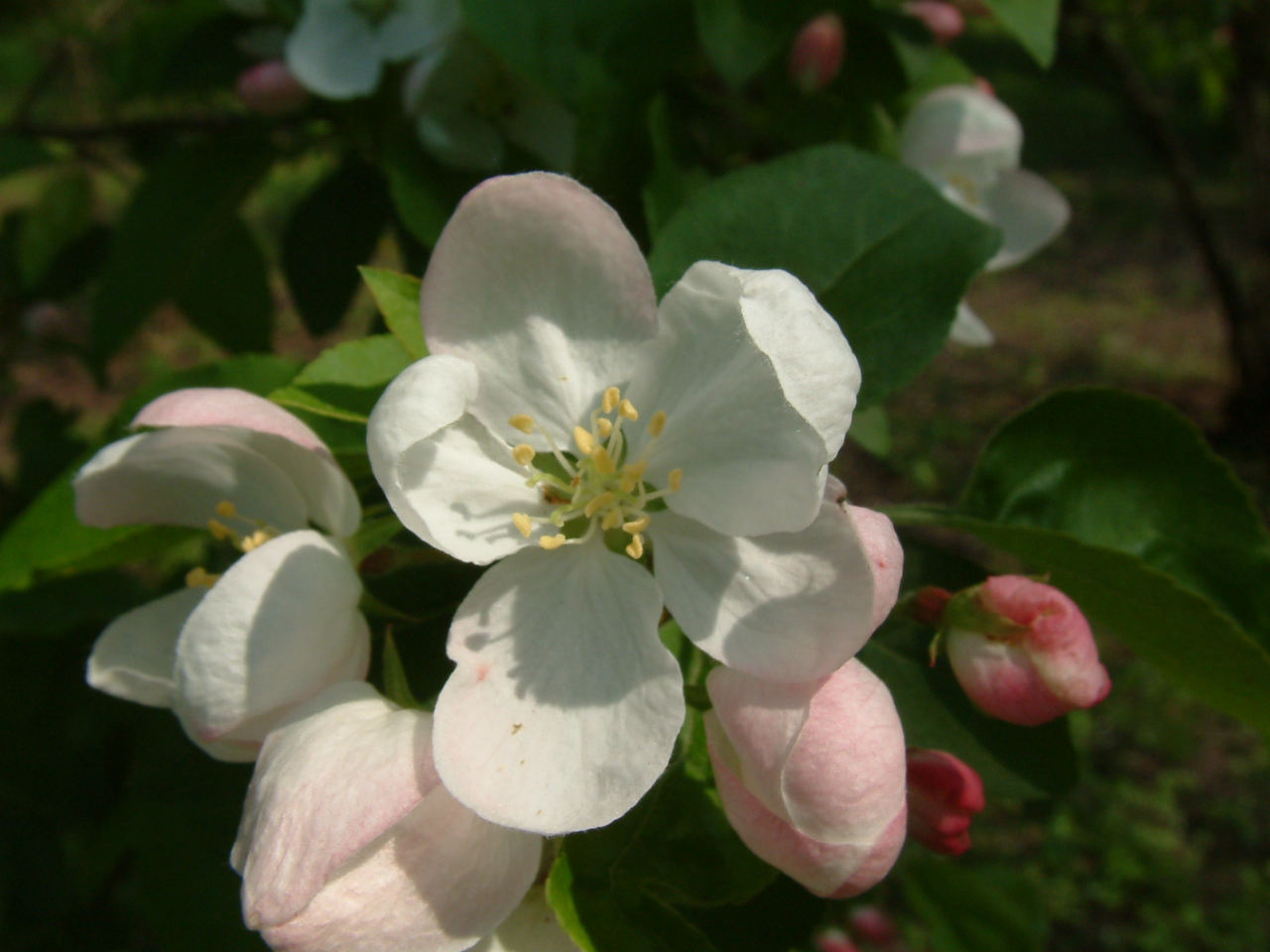

Conservation status
- Data Deficient (IUCN 3.1)

Scientific classification
- Kingdom: Plantae
- Clade: Tracheophytes
- Clade: Angiosperms
- Clade: Eudicots
- Clade: Rosids
- Order: Rosales
- Family: Rosaceae
- Genus: Malus
- Species: M. transitoria

Binomial name
- Malus transitoria (Batalin) C.K.Schneid.

Synonyms
- Malus centralasiatica Vassilcz.; Malus setok Vassilcz.; Malus transitoria var. centralasiatica (Vassilcz.) T.T.Yu; Malus transitoria var. glabrescens T.T.Yu & T.C.Ku; Malus transitoria var. setok (Vassilcz.) Ponomar.; Pyrus transitoria Batalin; Sinomalus transitoria (Batalin) Koidz.

= Malus transitoria =

Species of apple tree

Malus transitoria, the cut-leaf crabapple, is a species of flowering plant in the crabapple genus, Malus. It is native to China.

== Description ==
Malus transitoria is a deciduous tree growing to 8 m (26 ft) tall by 10 m (33 ft) wide. The deeply divided leaves turn yellow in autumn.

It produces abundant white flowers, and small yellow fruits 8 mm in diameter.

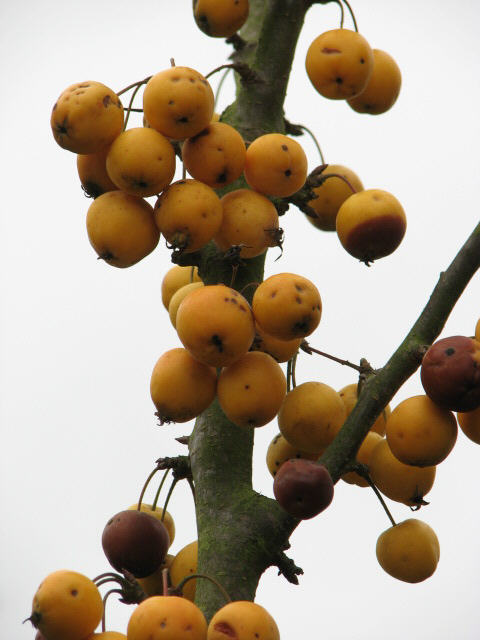
Fruits

== Taxonomy ==
=== Varieties ===
Varieties include:

- Malus transitoria var. centralasiatica
- Malus transitoria var. glabrescens
- Malus transitoria var. transitoria

These varieties are considered taxonomic synonyms by Plants of the World Online.

=== Etymology ===
The Latin transitoria means "short-lived". The name "cut-leaf" refers to the shape of the leaves.

== Uses ==
Malus transitoria is cultivated as an ornamental tree, for its elegant shape, abundant white blossoms, and yellow fruits. It has gained the Royal Horticultural Society's Award of Garden Merit.

It is also used as rootstock for other apples.
