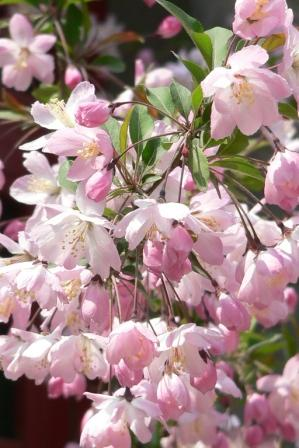

Conservation status
- Data Deficient (IUCN 3.1)

Scientific classification
- Kingdom: Plantae
- Clade: Tracheophytes
- Clade: Angiosperms
- Clade: Eudicots
- Clade: Rosids
- Order: Rosales
- Family: Rosaceae
- Genus: Malus
- Species: M. halliana

Binomial name
- Malus halliana Koehne 1890

Synonyms
- Malus baccata var. halliana (Koehne) Likhonos; Malus domestica var. halliana (Koehne) Likhonos; Malus floribunda var. parkmannii (F.L.Temple) Koidz.; Malus halliana var. spontanea (Makino) Koidz.; Pyrus halliana (Koehne) Voss

= Malus halliana =

Species of apple tree

Malus halliana is an East Asian crabapple species of Malus, known by the common name Hall crabapple. Its Chinese name is chui si hai tang(垂丝海棠).

It is generally considered to be a native tree of China, although some authors maintain that it is native to Japan, and was introduced into China.

== Description ==
Malus halliana is a tree up to 5 meters (17 feet) tall. flowers are pink. Fruits are purple.

== Cultivation ==
The tree is cultivated as an ornamental tree, for its abundant, fragrant pink flowers.
