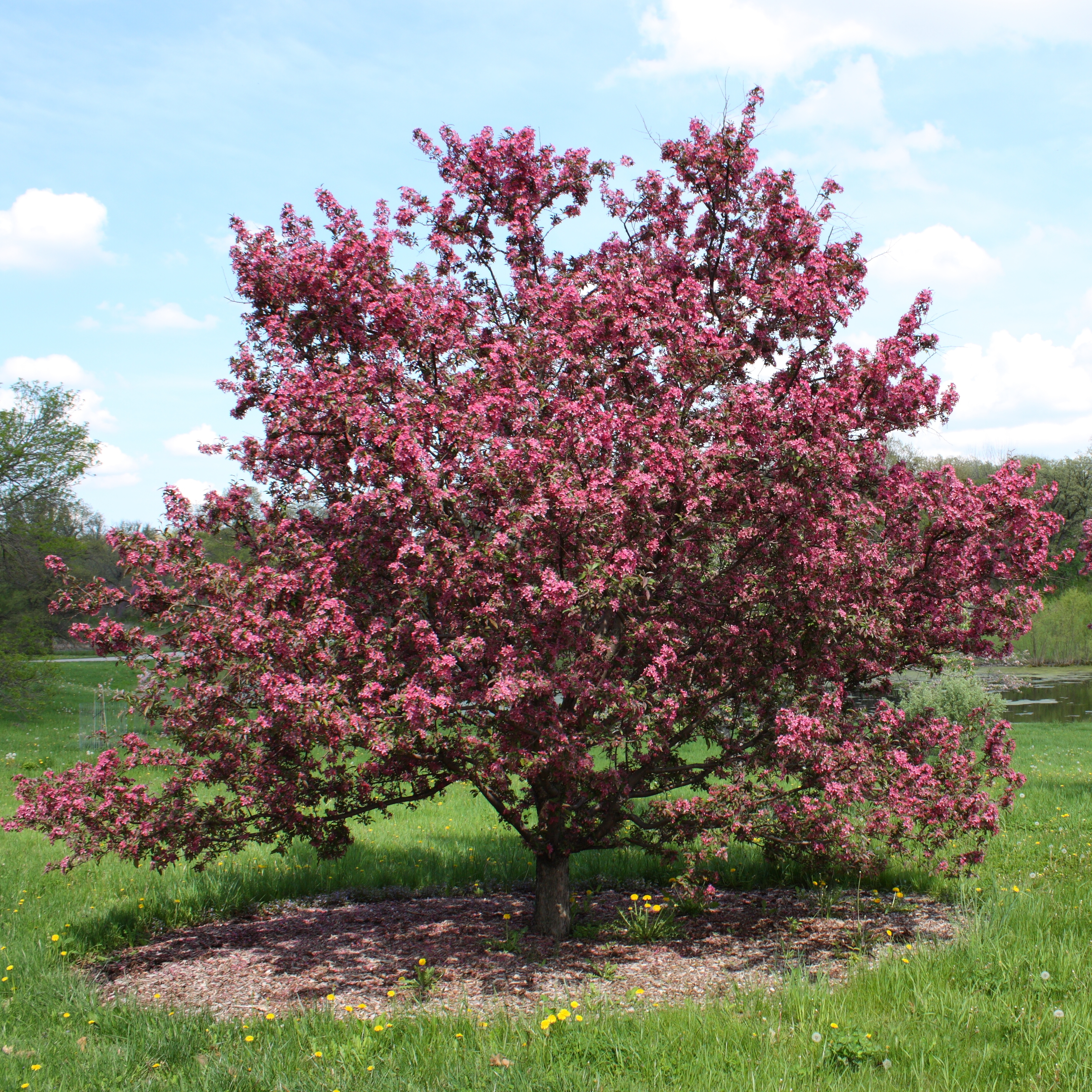
- Malus 'Purple Prince'

Scientific classification
- Kingdom: Plantae
- Clade: Tracheophytes
- Clade: Angiosperms
- Clade: Eudicots
- Clade: Rosids
- Order: Rosales
- Family: Rosaceae
- Subfamily: Amygdaloideae
- Tribe: Maleae
- Subtribe: Malinae
- Genus: Malus; Mill.

Type species
- Malus sylvestris Mill.

Species
- See text

Synonyms
- List: Chloromeles (Decne.) Decne.; Docynia Decne.; Eriolobus (Ser.) M.Roem.; Prameles Rushforth; Sinomalus Koidz.; × Tormimalus Holub

= Malus =

Malus Temporal range: Eocene–Recent

Flowering genus, rose family Rosaceae

Malus (/ˈmeɪləs/ or /ˈmæləs/) is a genus of about 32–57 species of small deciduous trees or shrubs in the rose family Rosaceae. It includes the domesticated orchard apple, crabapples, and wild apples.

The genus is native to the temperate zone of the Northern Hemisphere. Crabapples are used as rootstocks to fortify domestic apples with features such as cold hardiness, but are not of much commercial value as most are too sour.

== Description ==
Apple trees are typically 4–12 metres (13–39 feet) tall at maturity, with a dense, twiggy crown. The leaves are 3–10 centimetres (1 1/4–4 inches) long, alternate, simple, with a serrated margin.

Flowering occurs in the spring after 50–80 growing degree-days, varying by subspecies and cultivar. The flowers are borne in corymbs and have five petals, which may be white, pink, or red. They are perfect, with usually red stamens that produce copious pollen, and a half-inferior ovary. Many species are self-sterile, requiring cross-pollination between individuals by insects (typically bees, which freely visit the flowers for both nectar and pollen). A minority of cultivars are self-pollinating, such as "Granny Smith" and "Golden Delicious".

The fruit is a globose pome, varying in size from 1–4 cm (1/2–1 1/2 in) in diameter in most of the wild species, to 6 cm (2 1/4 in) in M. sylvestris sieversii, 8 cm (3 in) in M. domestica, and even larger in certain cultivated orchard apples. The centre of the fruit contains five carpels arranged in a starlike formation, each containing one or two seeds that contain cyanide.

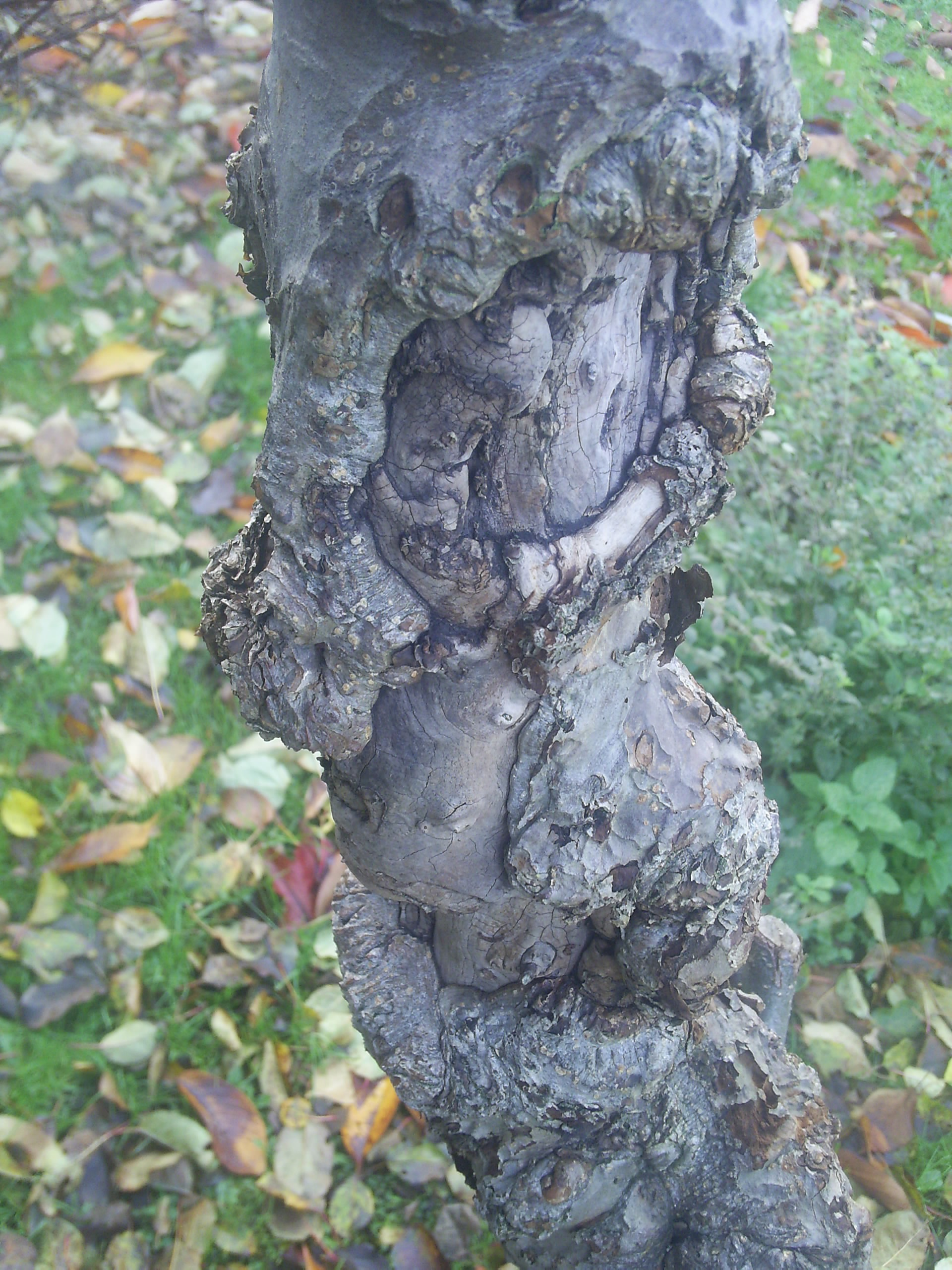
Trunk

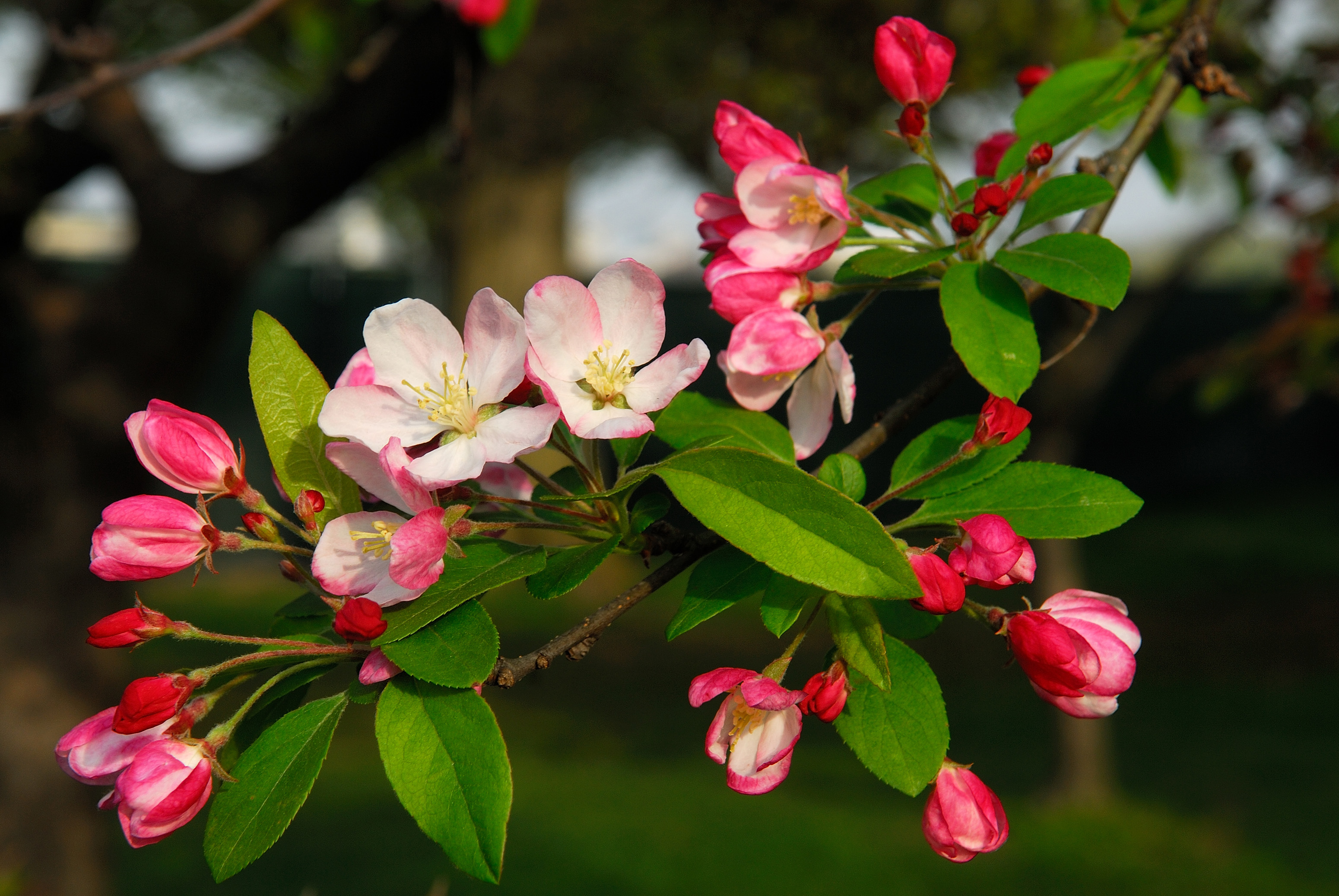
Crabapple blossoms

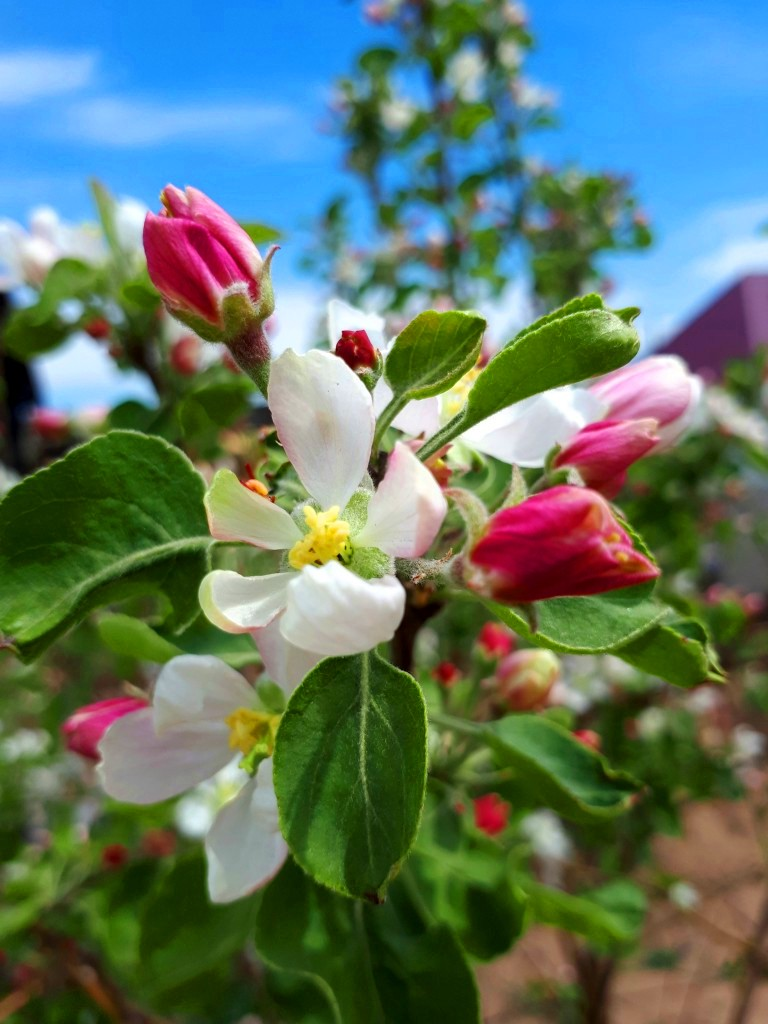
Blossoms, eastern Siberia

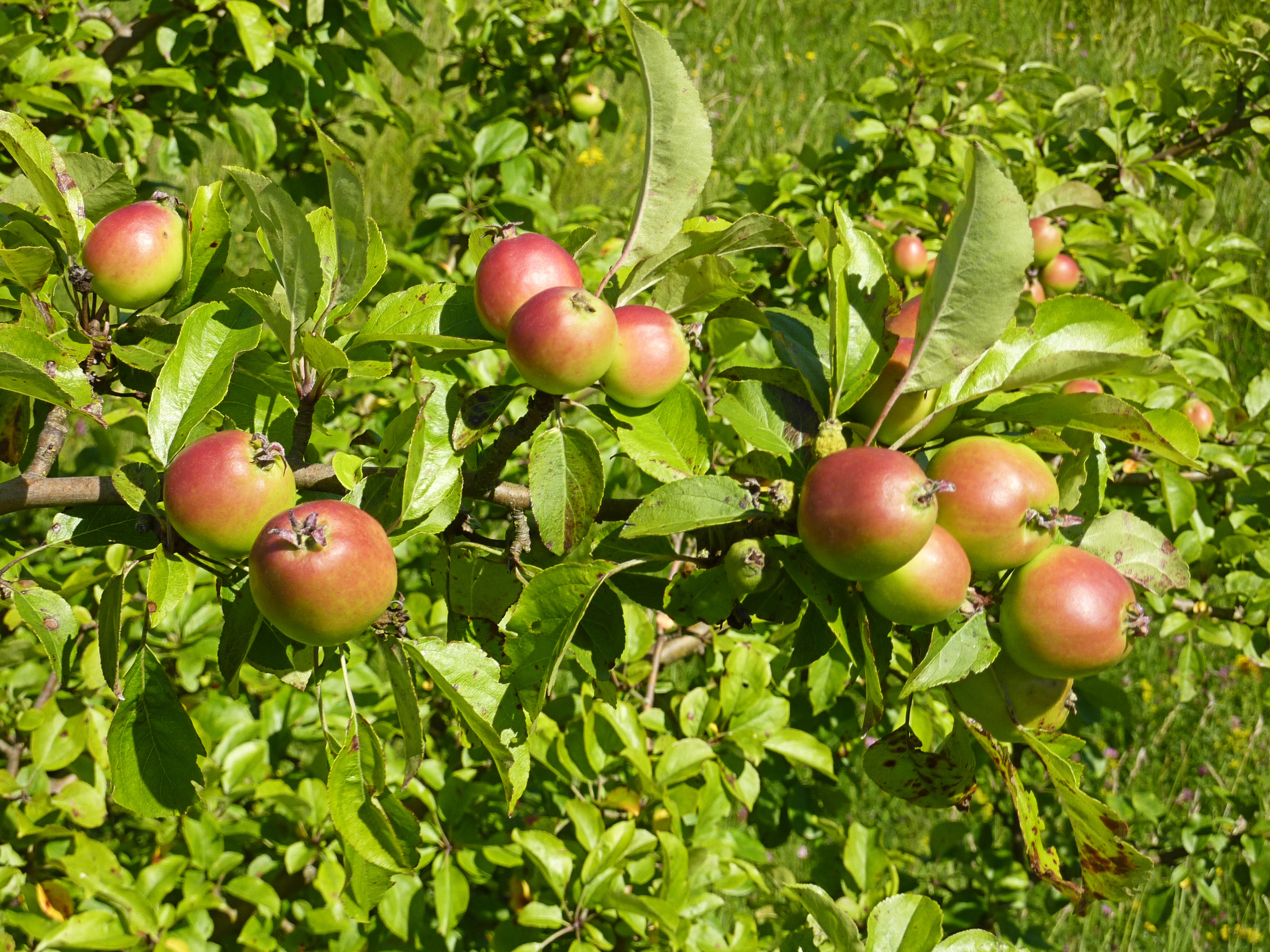
Ripe apples (M. domestica)

== Taxonomy ==
The genus Malus is subdivided into eight sections (six, with two added in 2006 and 2008). Several Malus species, including domestic apples, hybridize freely.

The oldest fossils of the genus date to the Eocene (Lutetian), which are leaves belonging to the species M. collardii and M. kingiensis from western North America (Idaho) and the Russian Far East (Kamchatka), respectively.

=== Species ===
The following species and hybrids are currently accepted:

- Malus angustifolia (Aiton) Michx. – southern crabapple
- Malus asiatica Nakai – Chinese pearleaf crabapple
- Malus baccata (L.) Borkh. – Siberian crabapple
- Malus coronaria (L.) Mill. – sweet crabapple
- Malus crescimannoi Raimondo
- Malus daochengensis C.L.Li
- Malus delavayi (Franch.) B.B.Liu
- Malus domestica (Suckow) Borkh. – domestic or orchard apple
- Malus doumeri (Bois) A.Chev. – Taiwan crabapple
- Malus florentina (Zuccagni) C.K.Schneid. – Florentine crabapple, hawthorn-leaf crabapple
- Malus fusca (Raf.) C.K.Schneid. – Oregon or Pacific crabapple
- Malus halliana Koehne – Hall crabapple
- Malus honanensis Rehder
- Malus hupehensis (Pamp.) Rehder – tea crabapple
- Malus indica (Wall.) B.B.Liu
- Malus ioensis (Alph.Wood) Britton – prairie crabapple
- Malus jinxianensis J.Q.Deng & J.Y.Hong
- Malus kansuensis (Batalin) C.K.Schneid. – Calva crabapple
- Malus kirghisorum Al.Fed. & Fed.
- Malus komarovii (Sarg.) Rehder
- Malus leiocalyca S.Z.Huang
- Malus longiunguis (Q.Luo & J.L.Liu) B.B.Liu
- Malus muliensis T.C.Ku
- Malus ombrophila Hand.-Mazz.
- Malus orientalis Uglitzk.
- Malus prattii (Hemsl.) C.K.Schneid. – Pratt's crabapple
- Malus prunifolia (Willd.) Borkh. – plum-leaf crabapple, Chinese crabapple
- Malus rockii Rehder – native to China and Bhutan
- Malus roseotakanabensis Iketani & Minamit.
- Malus sikkimensis (Wenz.) Koehne – Sikkim crabapple
- Malus spectabilis (Aiton) Borkh. – Asiatic apple, Chinese crabapple
- Malus spontanea (Makino) Makino - nokaidō
- Malus sylvestris (L.) Mill. – European crabapple
- Malus toringo (Siebold) de Vriese (syns. Malus sargentii, Malus sieboldii) – Sargent crabapple, Toringo crabapple, or Siebold's crabapple
- Malus toringoides (Rehder) Hughes – cut-leaf crabapple
- Malus transitoria (Batalin) C.K.Schneid. – cut-leaf crabapple
- Malus trilobata (Labill. ex Poir.) C.K.Schneid. – Lebanese wild apple, erect crabapple, or three-lobed apple tree
- Malus turkmenorum Juz. & Popov (syn. Malus sieversii) – wild ancestor of cultivated species Malus domestica
- Malus yunnanensis (Franch.) C.K.Schneid. – Yunnan crabapple
- Malus zhaojiaoensis N.G.Jiang

Hybrids

- Malus × atrosanguinea (Späth) C.K.Schneid. - carmine crabapple
- Malus × brevipes (Rehder) Rehder - shrub apple
- Malus × dasyphylla Borkh.
- Malus × floribunda Siebold ex Van Houtte – Japanese flowering crabapple
- Malus × kaido (Wenz.) Pardé (syn. Malus × micromalus) – midget crabapple
- Malus × magdeburgensis Hartwig
- Malus × platycarpa Rehder
- Malus × purpurea (A.Barbier) Rehder
- Malus × soulardii (L.H.Bailey) Britton
- Malus × sublobata (Dippel) Rehder
- Malus × zumi (Matsum.) Rehder

=== Formerly placed here ===
- Macromeles tschonoskii (Maxim.) Koidz. (as Malus tschonoskii (Maxim.) C.K.Schneid.) – Chonosuki crabapple and pillar apple

=== Selected artificial hybrids ===
- Malus × sublobata – yellow autumn crabapple (M. asiatica × M. toringo)

=== Fossil species ===
After

- Malus collardii Axelrod, North America (Idaho), Eocene
- Malus kingiensis Budants, Kamchatka Peninsula, Russia, Eocene
- Malus florissantensis (Cockerell) MacGinitie Green River Formation, North America (Colorado) Eocene
- Malus pseudocredneria (Cockerell) MacGinitie Green River Formation, North America (Colorado) Eocene
- Malus idahoensis R.W.Br. North America (Idaho), Miocene
- Malus parahupehensis J.Hsu and R.W.Chaney Shanwang, Shandong, China, Miocene
- Malus antiqua Doweld Romania, Pliocene
- Malus pseudoangustifolia E.W.Berry North America (South Carolina), Pleistocene

== Distribution and habitat ==
The genus is native to the temperate zone of the Northern Hemisphere.

== Cultivation ==
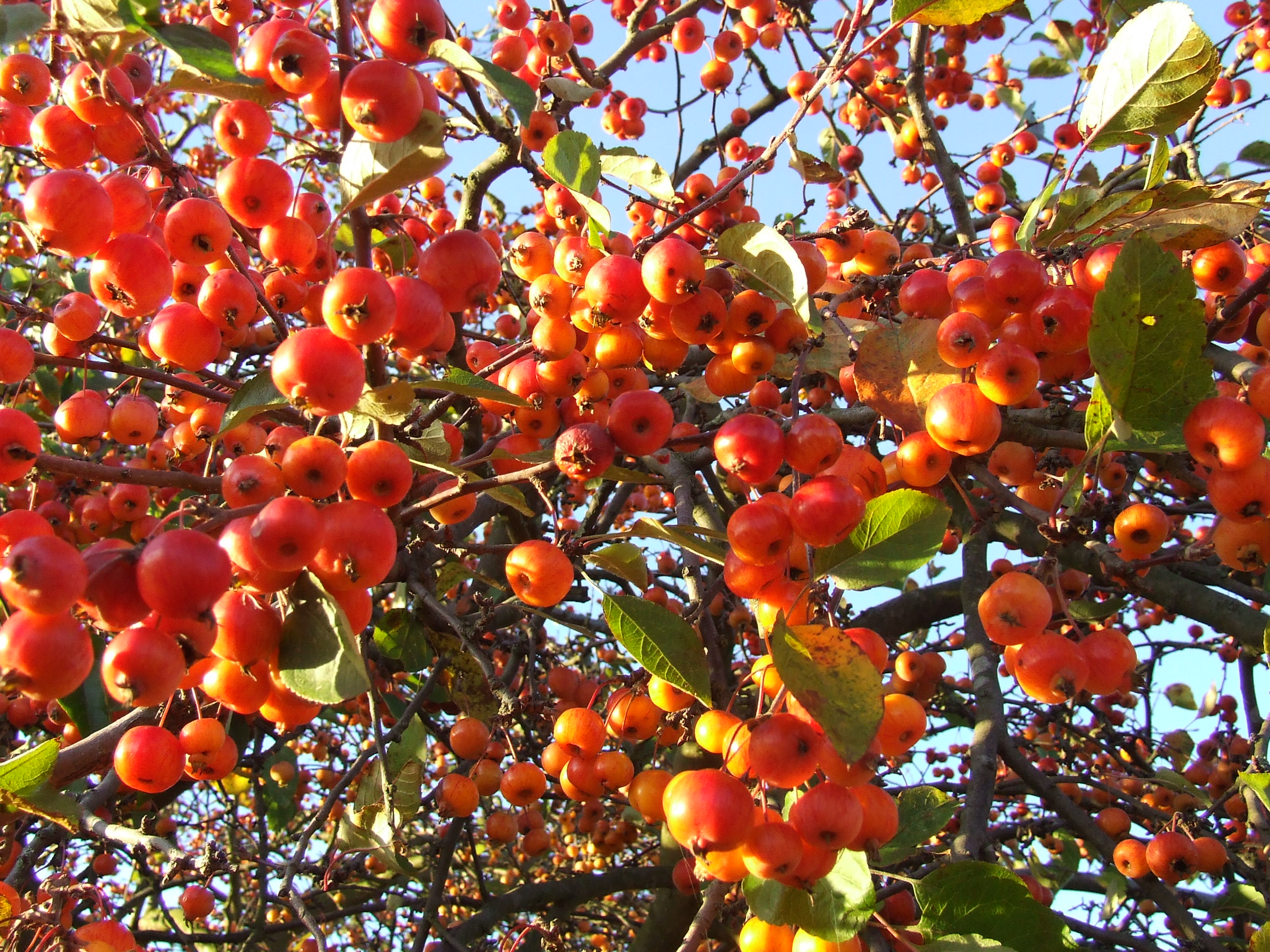
'Evereste' fruits

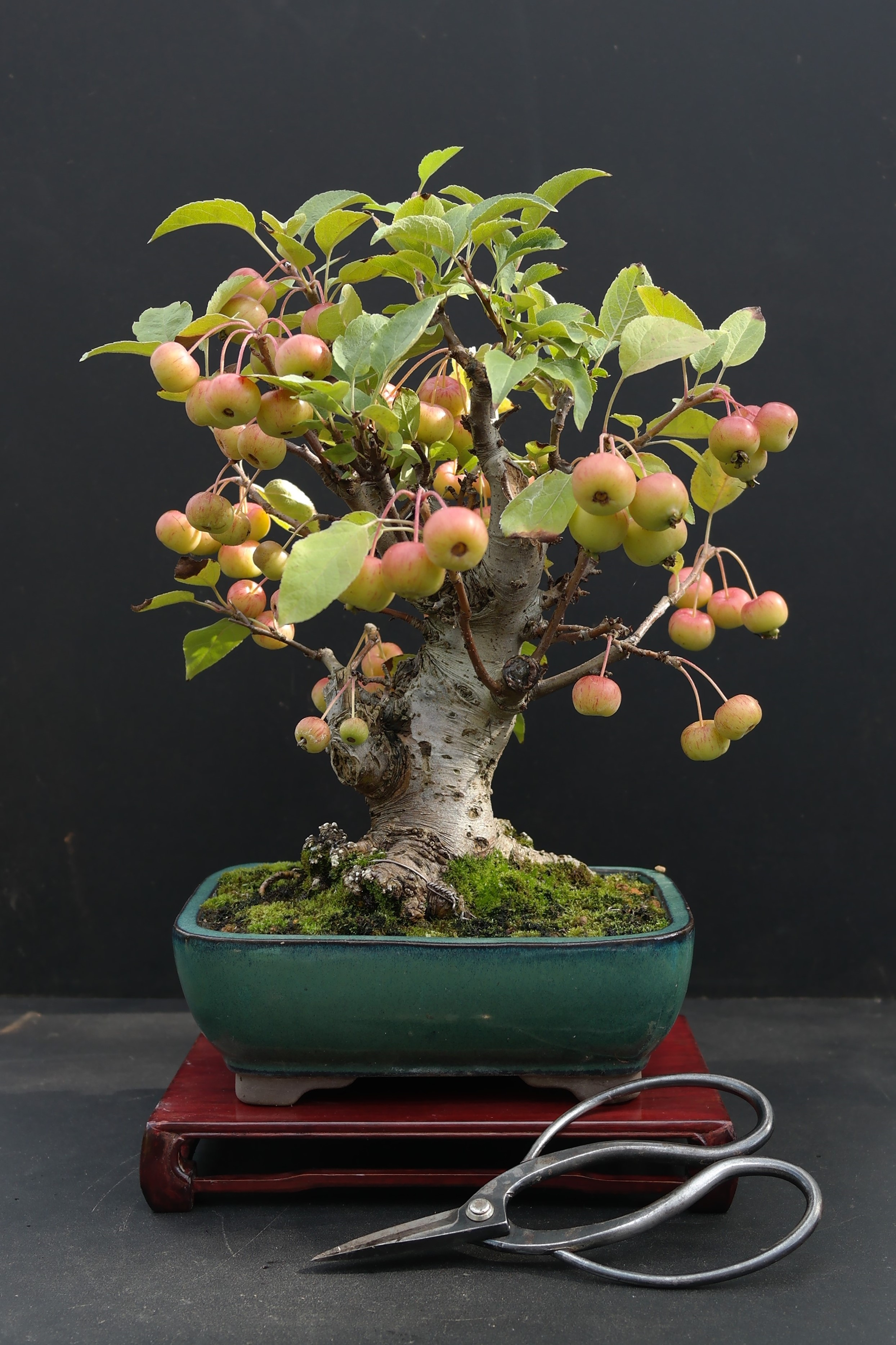
Crabapple bonsai tree in August

Crabapples are popular as compact ornamental trees, providing blossom in spring and colourful fruit in autumn. The fruits often persist throughout winter. Numerous hybrid cultivars have been selected.

Some crabapples are used as rootstocks for domestic apples to add beneficial characteristics. For example, the rootstocks of M. baccata varieties are used to give additional cold hardiness to the combined plants for orchards in cold northern areas.

They are also used as pollinizers in apples orchards. Varieties of crabapple are selected to bloom contemporaneously with the apple variety in an orchard planting, and the crab trees are planted every sixth or seventh tree, or limbs of a crab tree are grafted onto some of the apple trees. In emergencies, a bucket or drum bouquet of crabapple flowering branches is placed near the beehives as orchard pollenizers.

Because of the plentiful blossoms and small fruit, crabapples are popular for use in bonsai culture.

=== Cultivars ===
These cultivars have won the Royal Horticultural Society's Award of Garden Merit:

- 'Adirondack'
- 'Butterball'
- 'Comtesse de Paris'
- 'Evereste'
- 'Jelly King'='Mattfru'
- 'Laura'
- Malus × robusta 'Red Sentinel'
- 'Sun Rival'

== Toxicity ==
The seeds contain cyanide compounds.

== Uses ==
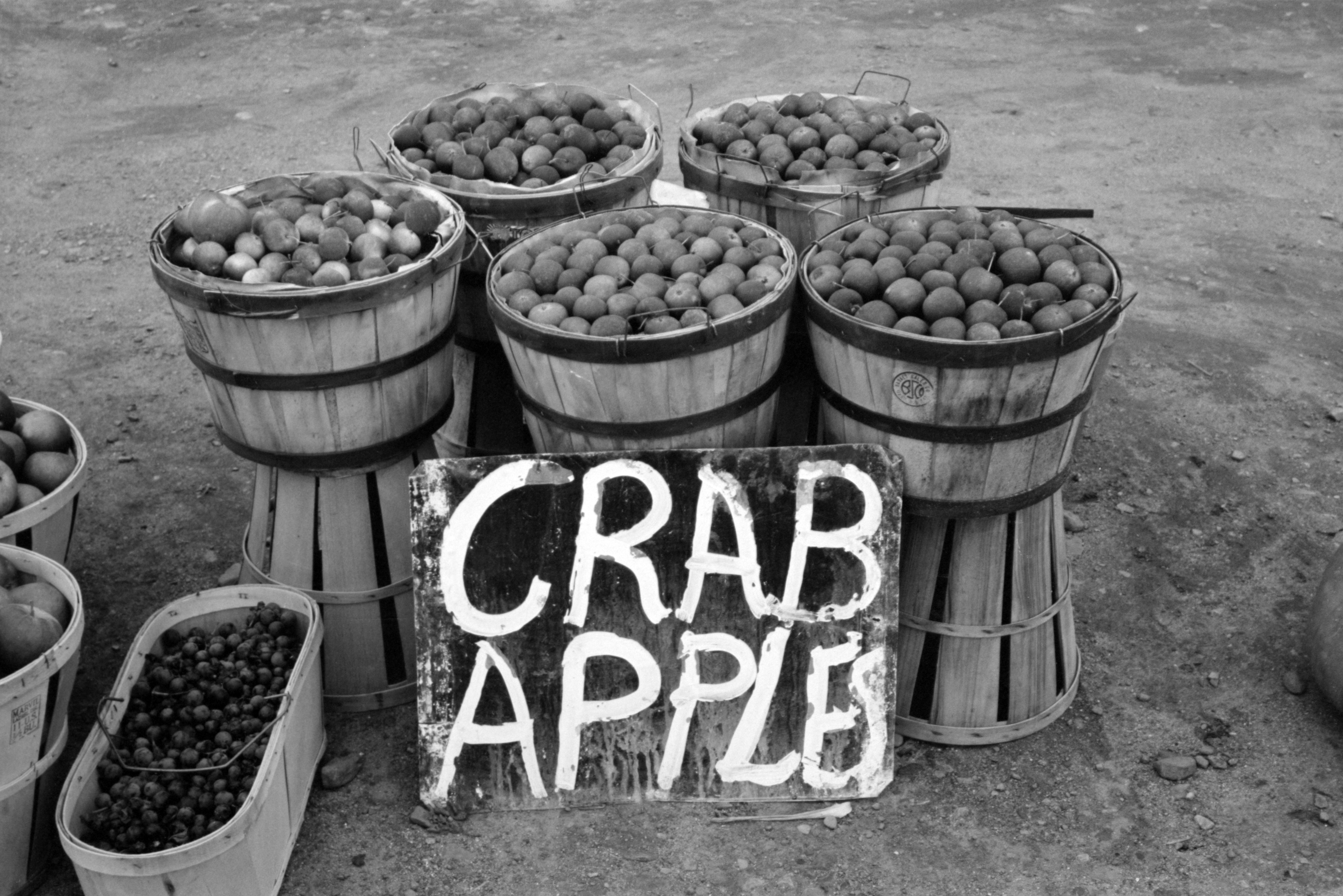
Baskets of crabapples for sale in Connecticut in 1939

Crabapple fruit is not an important crop in most areas. The fruit is rarely eaten raw due to the sour taste resulting from high levels of malic acid. Some species have a woody texture. In some Southeast Asian cultures, they are valued as a sour condiment, sometimes eaten with salt and chilli or shrimp paste. Some varieties of crabapple, such as the 'Chestnut' cultivar, are sweet.

Crabapple is a source of pectin. Using sugar and spices such as ginger, nutmeg, cinnamon, and allspice, their juice can be made into ruby-coloured crabapple jelly with a full, spicy flavour. A small portion of crabapples can also be used along with regular apples to make cider.

The wood burns slowly at a low intensity, producing clean smoke and a pleasant scent, giving smoked foods a sweet and mild flavour. Applewood is easier to cut when green, being exceedingly difficult to carve by hand. It is used to make handles of hand saws; in the early 1900s, 2,000,000 board feet of applewood were used annually for this purpose.
