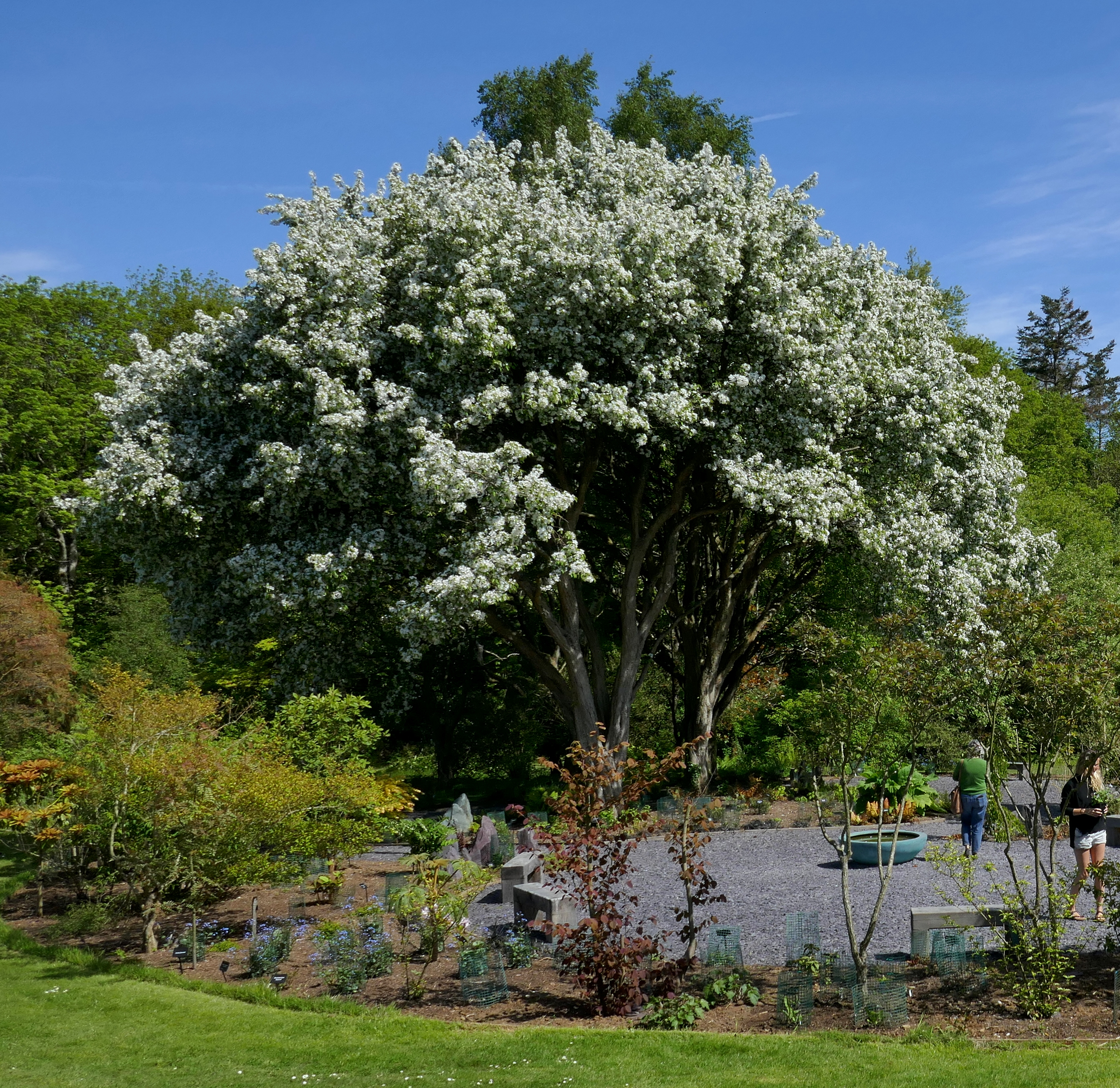

Conservation status
- Least Concern (IUCN 3.1)

Scientific classification
- Kingdom: Plantae
- Clade: Embryophytes
- Clade: Tracheophytes
- Clade: Spermatophytes
- Clade: Angiosperms
- Clade: Eudicots
- Clade: Rosids
- Order: Rosales
- Family: Rosaceae
- Genus: Malus
- Species: M. hupehensis

Binomial name
- Malus hupehensis (Pamp.) Rehder 1933 not Koidz. 1934

Synonyms
- Malus domestica var. hupehensis (Pamp.) Likhonos; Malus theifera Rehder; Pyrus hupehensis Pamp. 1910; Pyrus theifera (Rehder) Cardot; Pyrus theifera (Rehder) L.H.Bailey

= Malus hupehensis =

Species of apple tree

Malus hupehensis, common names Chinese crab apple, Hupeh crab or tea crabapple, is a species of flowering plant in the apple genus Malus of the family Rosaceae.

It is native to China.

== Description ==
Malus hupehensis is a vigorous deciduous tree growing to 12 metres (39 feet) tall and broad.

It has pink buds, opening to fragrant white blossoms in spring. It produces bright red, cherry-sized crab-apples in the autumn.

== Etymology ==
Malus is the ancient Latin name for apple trees.

Hupehensis means 'from Hubei province, China'. 'Hubei' was formerly spelled 'Hupeh' or 'Hupei' in English.

== Uses ==
The plant is cultivated as an ornamental tree, for planting in gardens. It has gained the Royal Horticultural Society's Award of Garden Merit.
