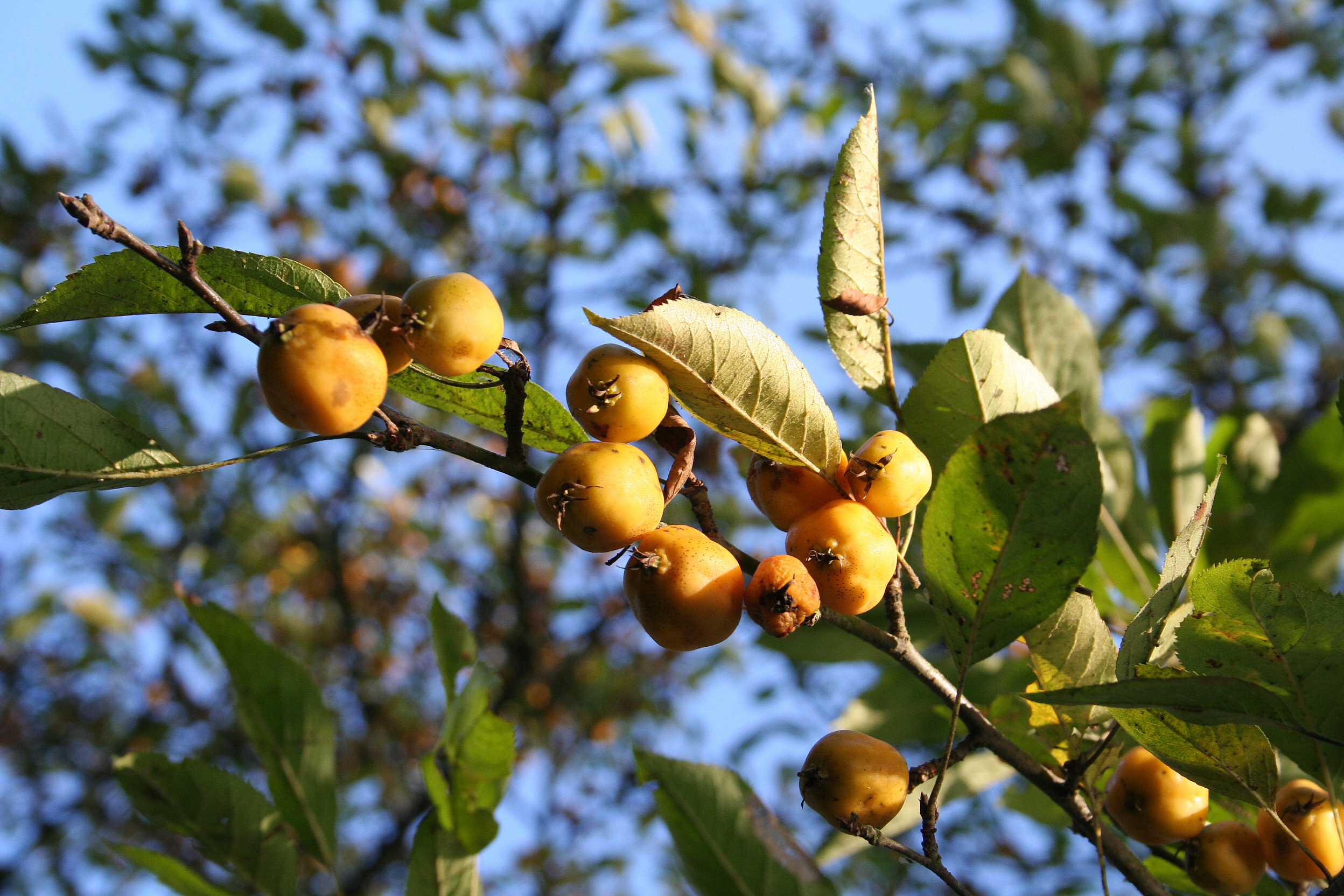

Conservation status
- Data Deficient (IUCN 3.1)

Scientific classification
- Kingdom: Plantae
- Clade: Tracheophytes
- Clade: Angiosperms
- Clade: Eudicots
- Clade: Rosids
- Order: Rosales
- Family: Rosaceae
- Genus: Malus
- Species: M. toringoides

Binomial name
- Malus toringoides Hughes

= Malus toringoides =

Species of apple tree

Malus toringoides is a crabapple species in the family Rosaceae, with the common name cut-leaf crabapple.

The tree is endemic to mountain ranges of China, located within Shaanxi, Gansu, Ningxia, Qinghai and Sichuan Provinces.

Malus toringoides is a wild crabapple tree, and is sometimes used as a root stock in apple hybridizing. It is a naturally occurring hybrid species with multiple ploidy levels.
