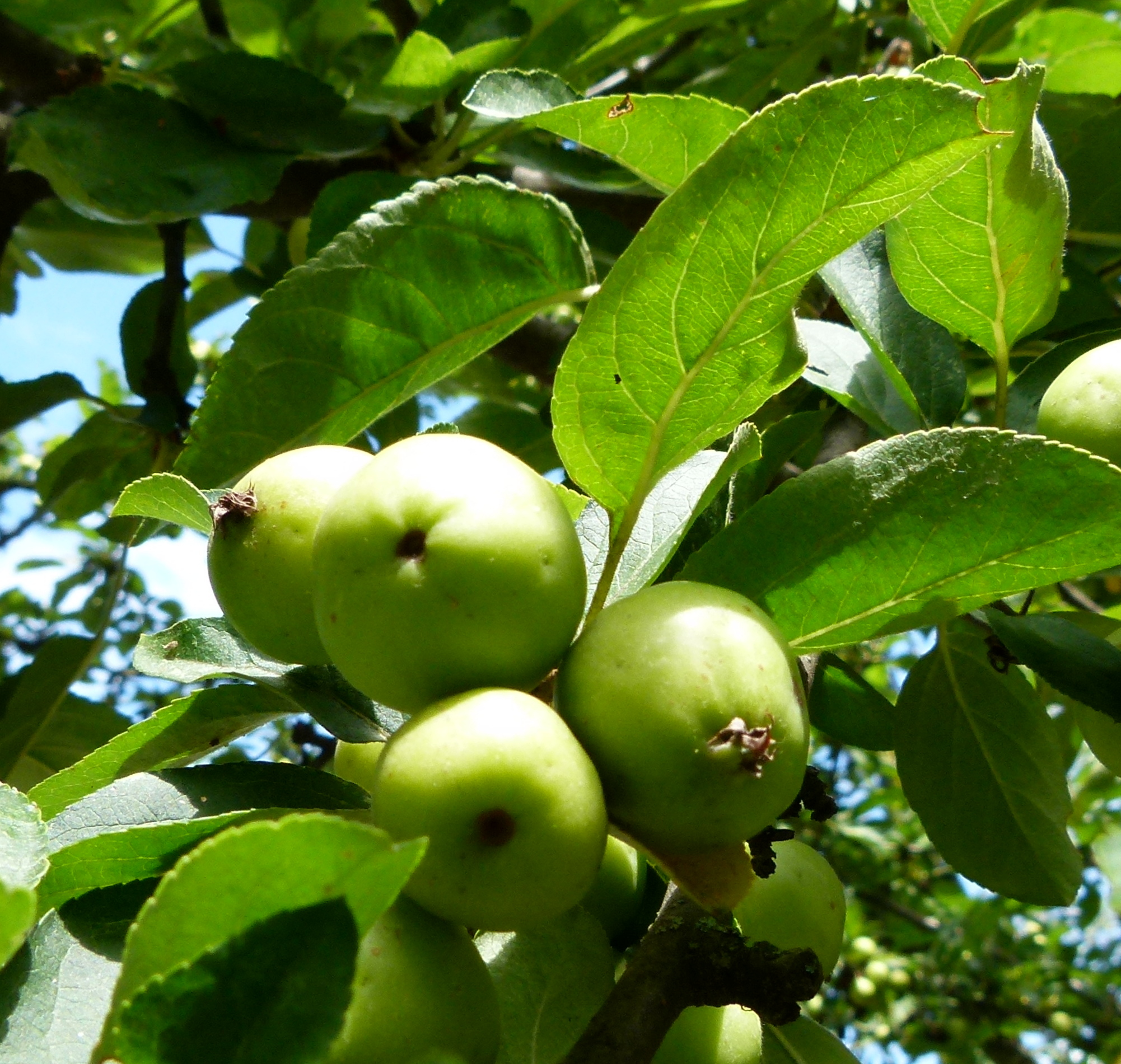
- Malus sieboldii var. zumi

Scientific classification
- Kingdom: Plantae
- Clade: Tracheophytes
- Clade: Angiosperms
- Clade: Eudicots
- Clade: Rosids
- Order: Rosales
- Family: Rosaceae
- Genus: Malus
- Species: M. sieboldii

Binomial name
- Malus sieboldii Rehder

= Malus sieboldii =

Species of apple tree

Malus sieboldii, commonly called Siebold's crab, Siebold's crabapple or Toringo crabapple, is a species of crabapple in the family Rosaceae.

== Taxonomy ==
Some botanists have reclassified it as Malus toringo.

=== Varieties ===
It is sometimes considered to have three varieties:

- Malus sieboldii var. sieboldii (the true Siebold's crabapple)
- Malus sieboldii var. sargentii, which is sometimes considered to be a separate species Malus sargentii
- Malus sieboldii var. zumi

The cultivar Malus toringo 'Scarlett' has received the Royal Horticultural Society's Award of Garden Merit.

== Distribution ==
Malus sieboldii—Malus toringo is native to eastern temperate Asia, in China, Japan, and Korea.

== Pests ==
Fungal plant pathogen Pseudocercospora mali is found on the leaves of the tree in Japan.

== See also ==
- Crabapples species
