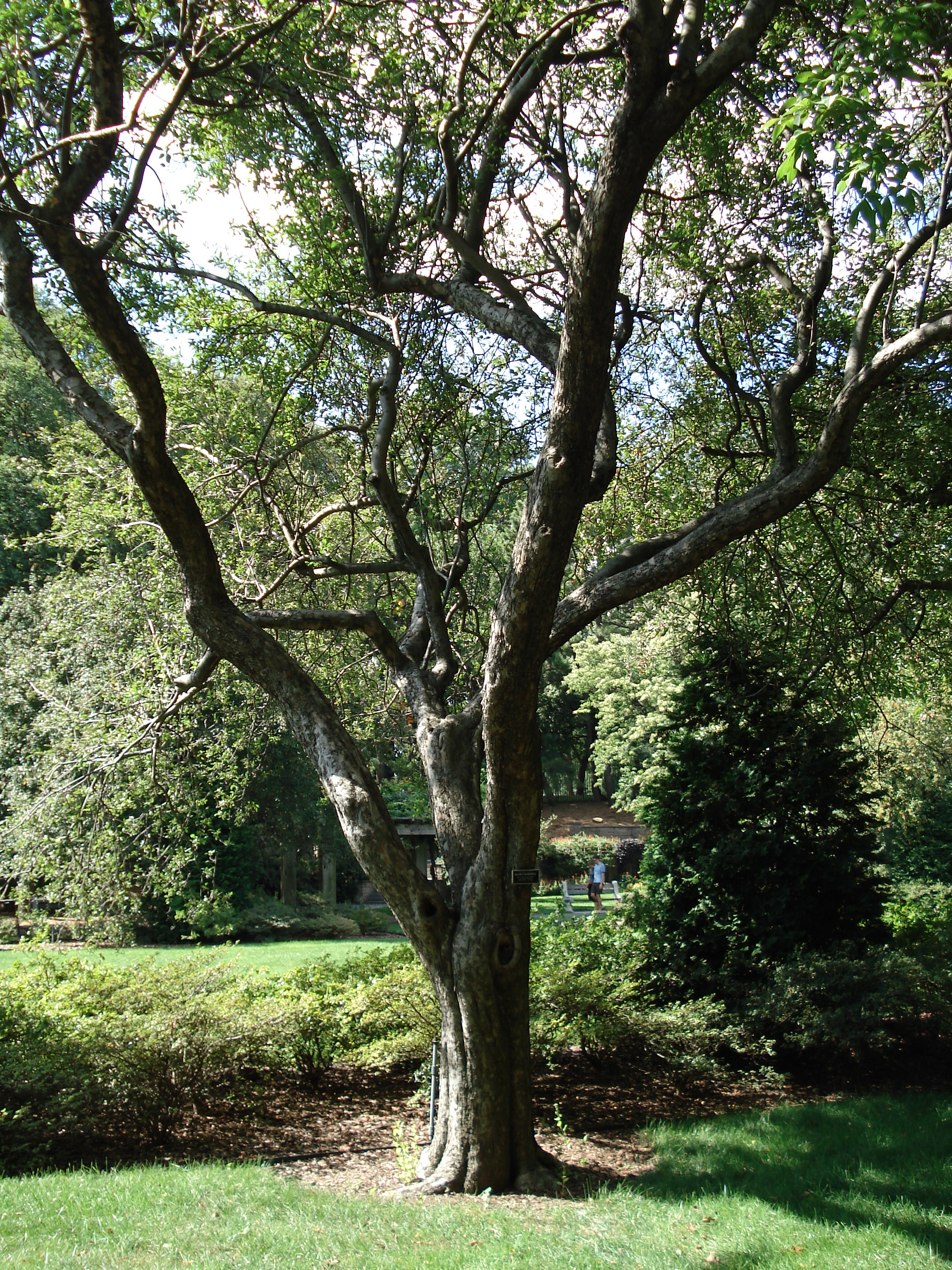

Conservation status
- Data Deficient (IUCN 3.1)

Scientific classification
- Kingdom: Plantae
- Clade: Tracheophytes
- Clade: Angiosperms
- Clade: Eudicots
- Clade: Rosids
- Order: Rosales
- Family: Rosaceae
- Genus: Malus
- Species: M. spectabilis

Binomial name
- Malus spectabilis (Aiton) Borkh.

= Malus spectabilis =

Species of apple tree

Malus spectabilis (Chinese: 海棠; pinyin: hǎitáng) is a species of crabapple known by the common names Asiatic apple, Chinese crab, HaiTang and Chinese flowering apple.

== Description ==
Malus spectabilis has white or pink flowers, depending on the variety. The fruit is yellow and about 2 centimeters wide.

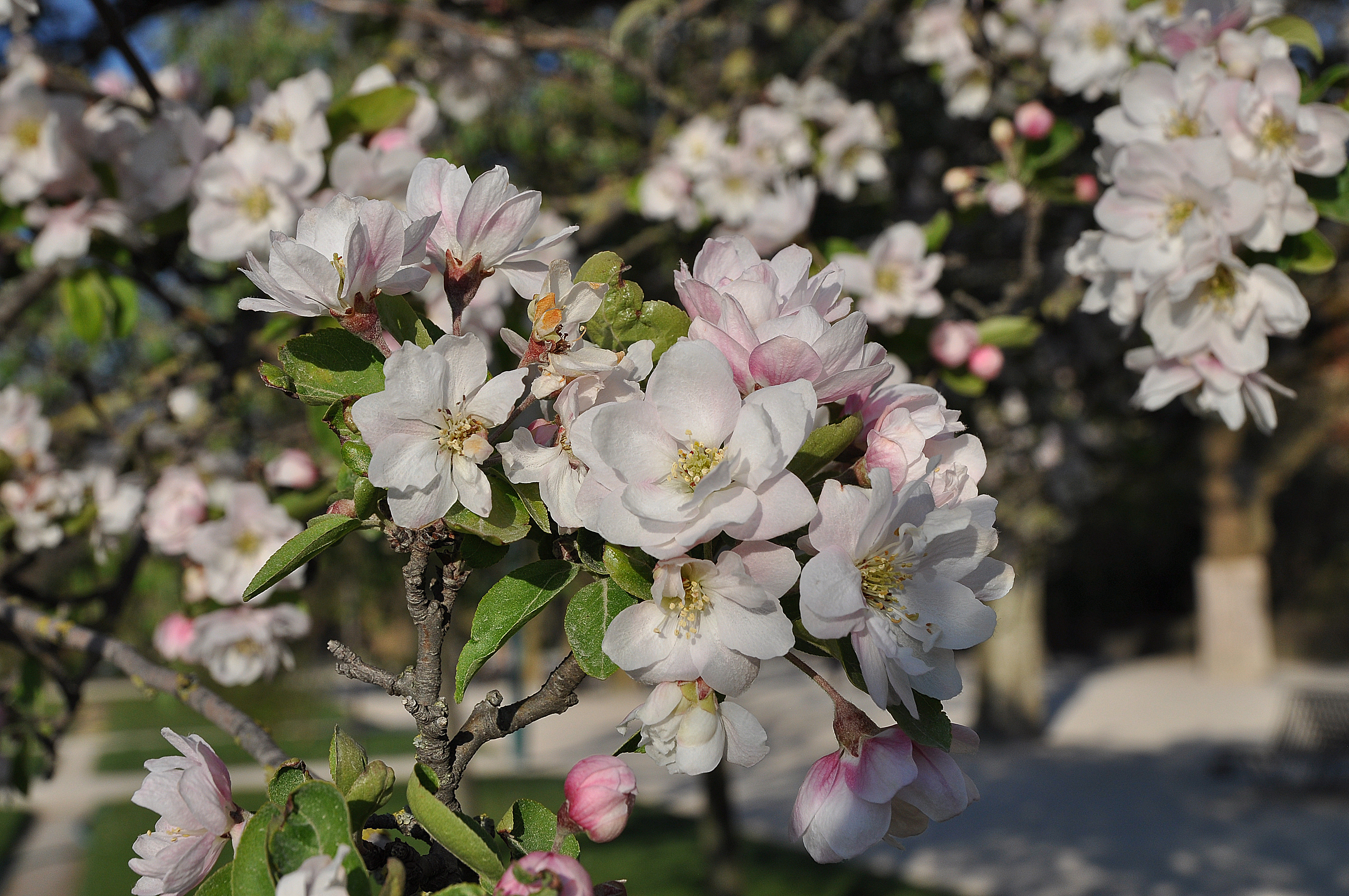
Flowering in Paris

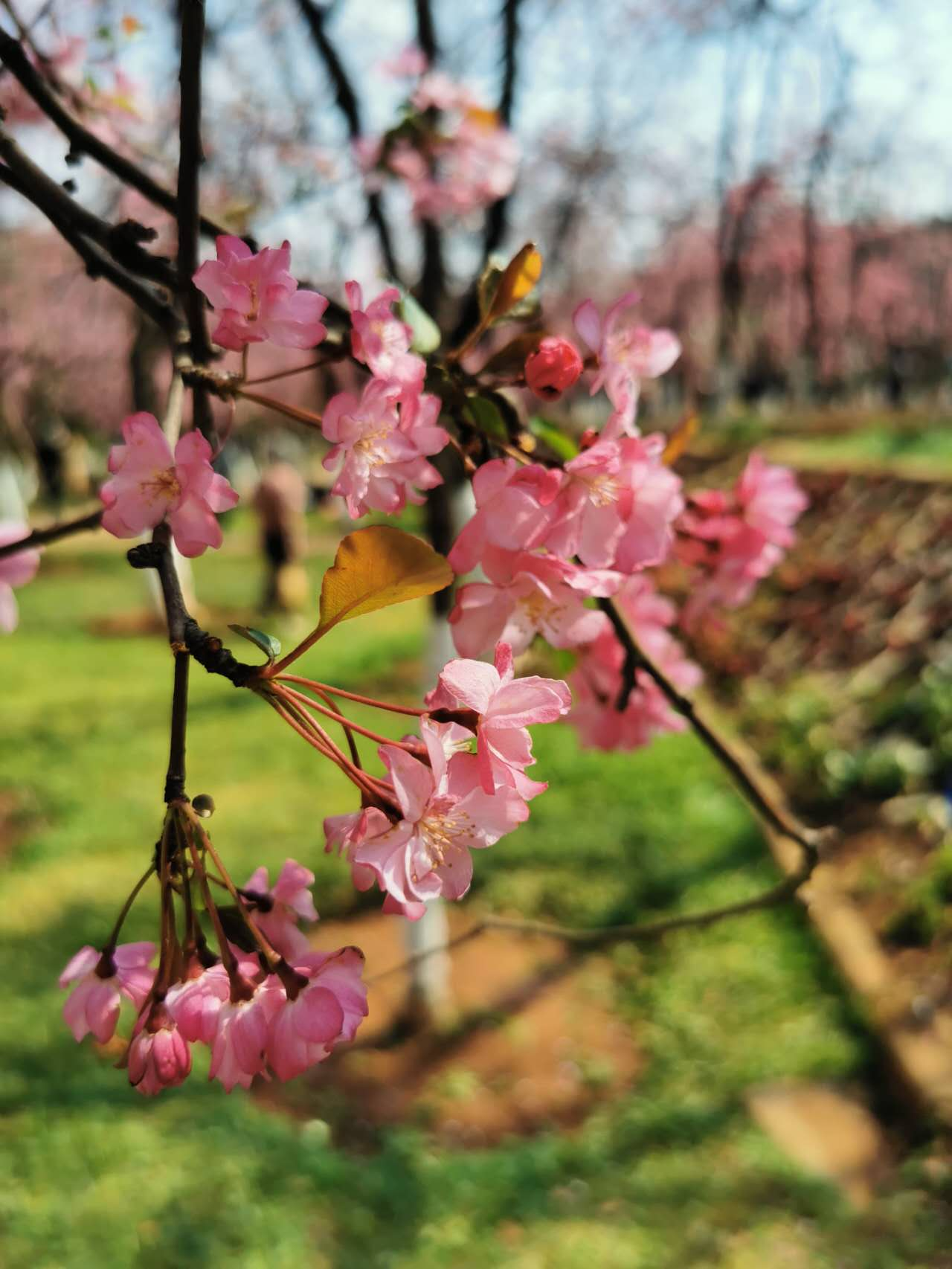
Pink flowers

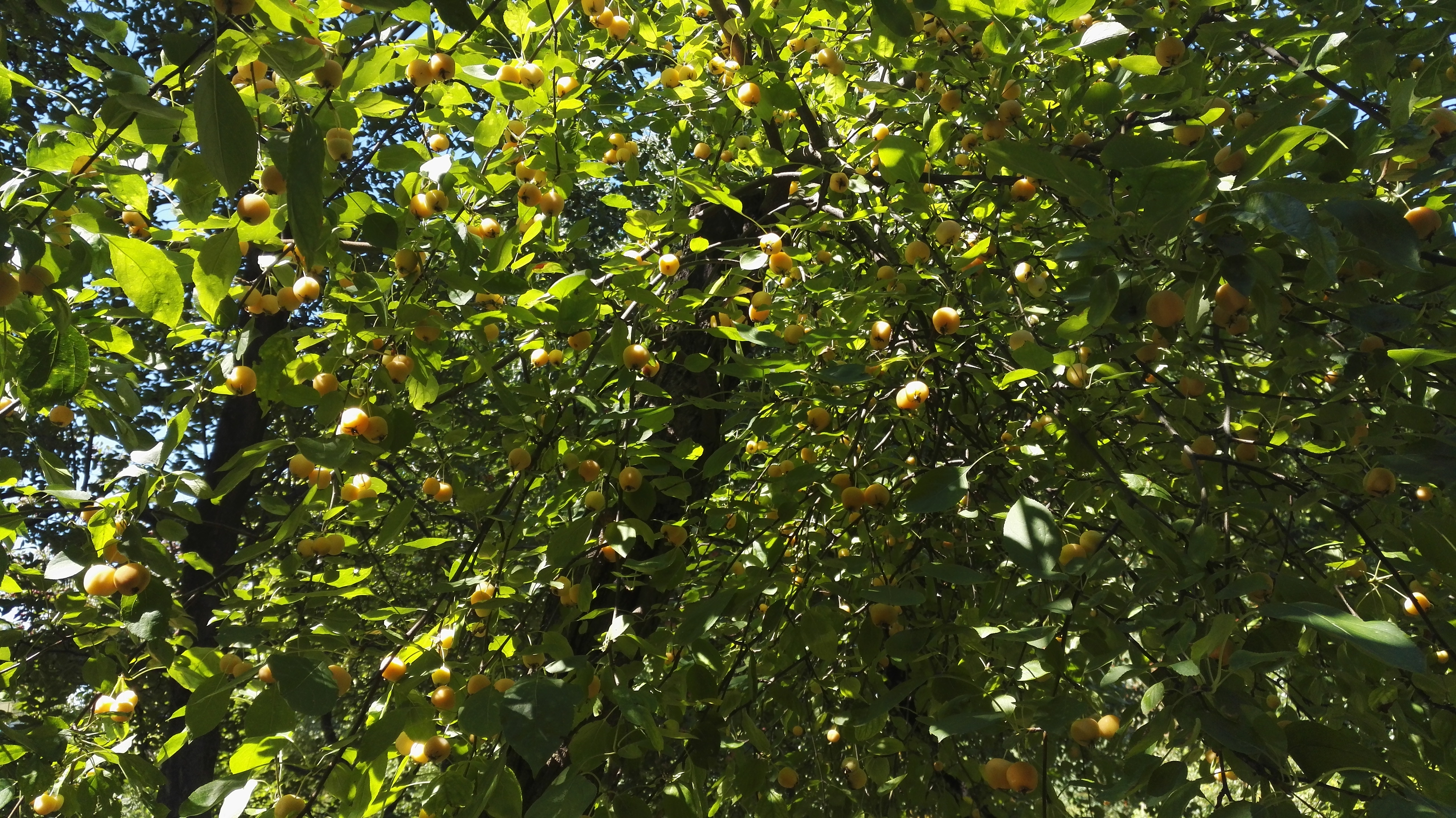
Fruits in Budapest garden

== Distribution and habitat ==
It is endemic to China and native to the provinces of Hebei, Jiangsu, Liaoning, Qinghai, Shaanxi, Shandong, Sichuan, Yunnan, and Zhejiang.

It is cultivated as an ornamental tree, especially popular in China.

== Cultural significance ==
In 2009, the M. spectabilis flower was named the city flower of Baoji, China.
