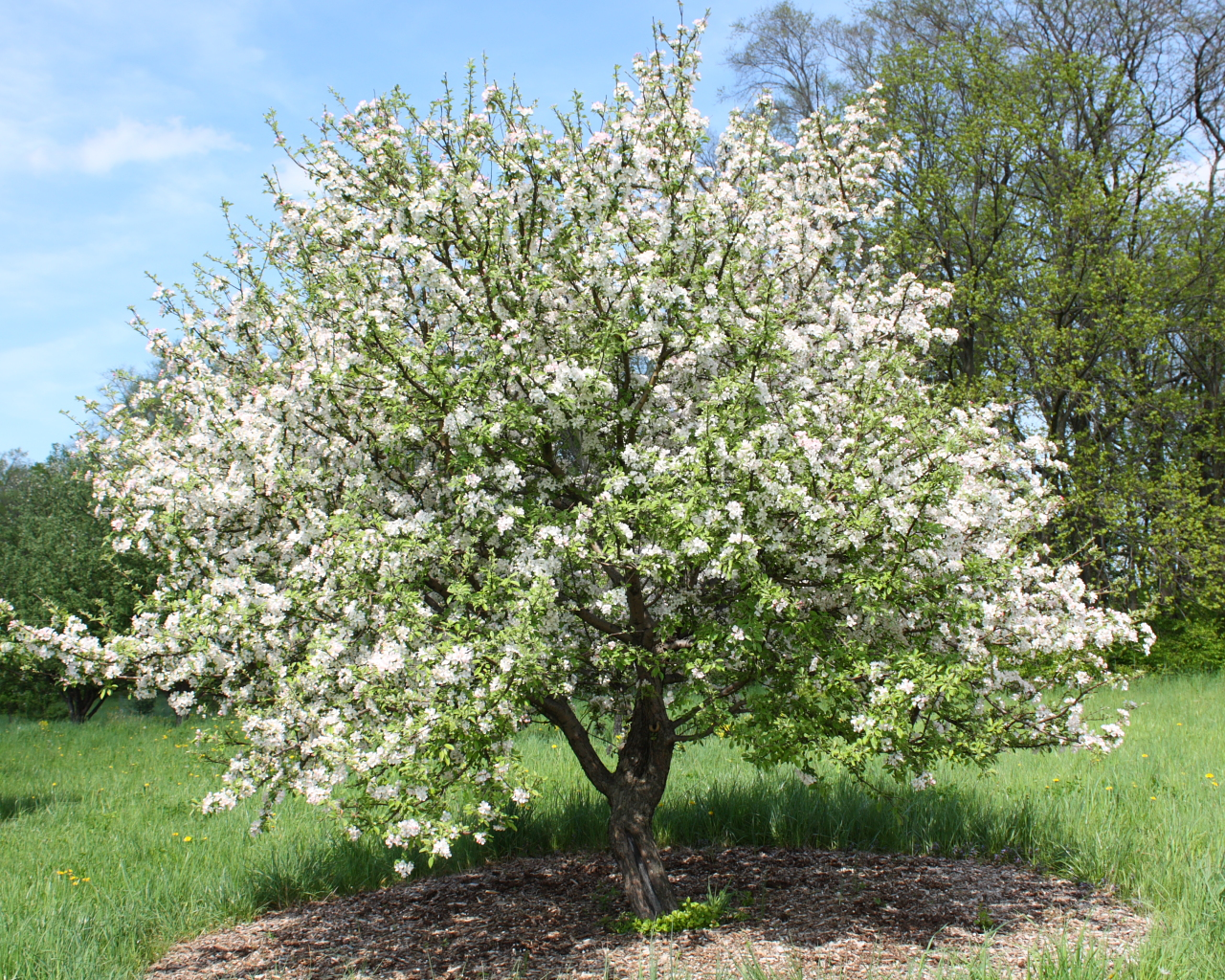
- Malus prunifolia

Conservation status
- Data Deficient (IUCN 3.1)

Scientific classification
- Kingdom: Plantae
- Clade: Tracheophytes
- Clade: Angiosperms
- Clade: Eudicots
- Clade: Rosids
- Order: Rosales
- Family: Rosaceae
- Genus: Malus
- Species: M. prunifolia

Binomial name
- Malus prunifolia (Willd.) Borkh.

= Malus prunifolia =

Species of apple tree

Malus prunifolia is a species of crabapple tree known by the common names plumleaf crab apple, plum-leaved apple, pear-leaf crabapple, Chinese apple and Chinese crabapple. It is native to China.

The number of chromosomes is 2n = 34.

== Description ==
It reaches from between 3 and 8 metres (10 and 26 ft) tall and bears white flowers and yellow or red fruit.

== Taxonomy ==
It was described botanically by Willdenow in the genus Pyrus and was transferred to Malus in 1803.

=== Varieties ===
Malus prunifolia has at least four varieties, some are grown for their fruit:

- Malus prunifolia var. obliquipedicellata X.W. Li & J.W. Sun
- M. prunifolia var. prunifolia
- M. prunifolia var. ringo Asami (Chinese apple)
- M. prunifolia var. rinki (Koidz.) Rehder P.L.Wilson (plum-leaf or Chinese crabapple)

== Distribution and habitat ==
Malus prunifolia is found in China in the provinces of Gansu, Guizhou, Hebei, Henan, Liaoning, Nei Mongol, Qinghai, Shaanxi, Shandong, Shanxi, and possibly Xinjiang. It is adapted to grow at a variety of elevations from sea-level plains, to slopes as high as 1,300 m (4,300 ft).

== Uses ==
Outside of China, it is grown for use as an ornamental tree or as rootstock.
