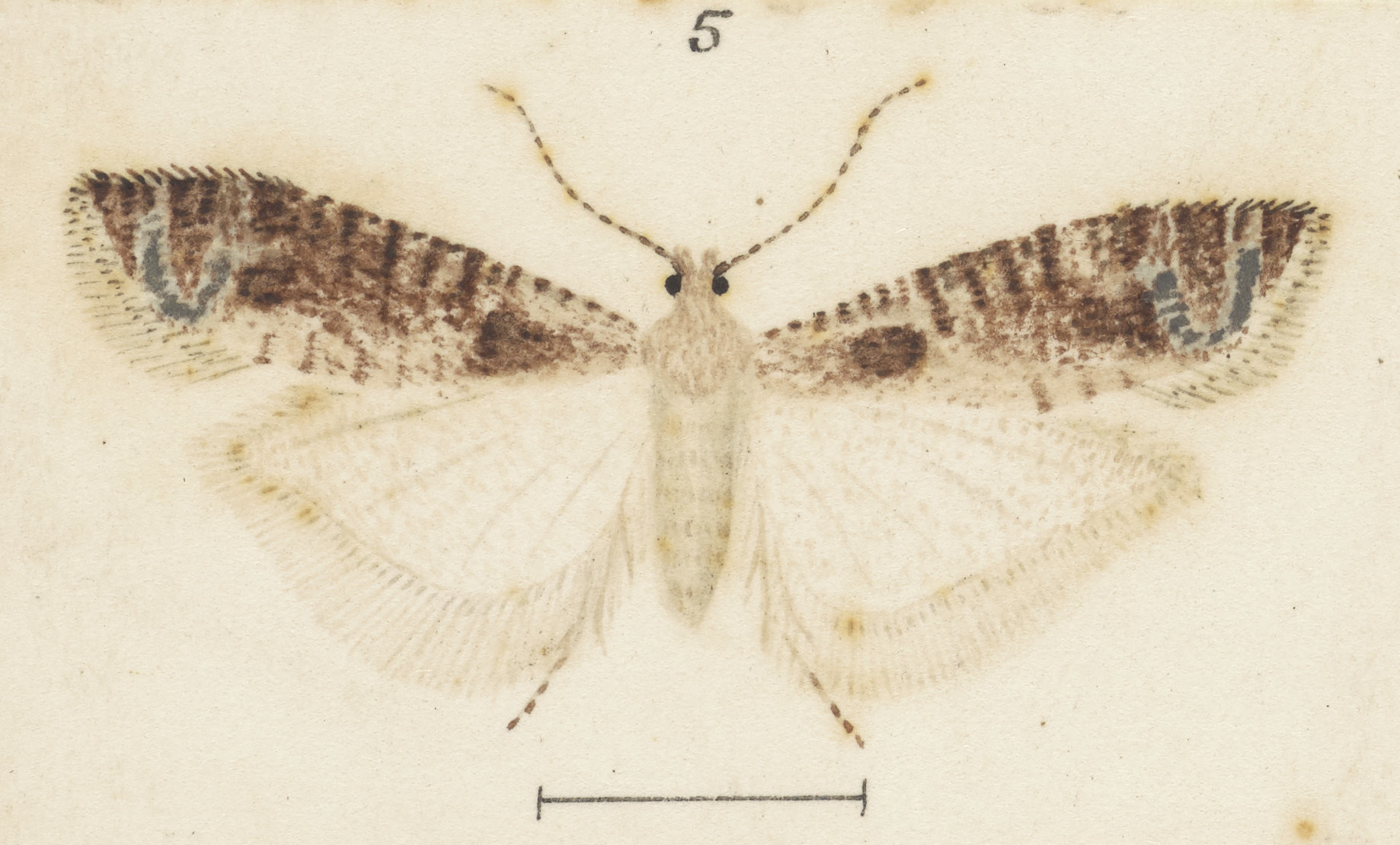
- female
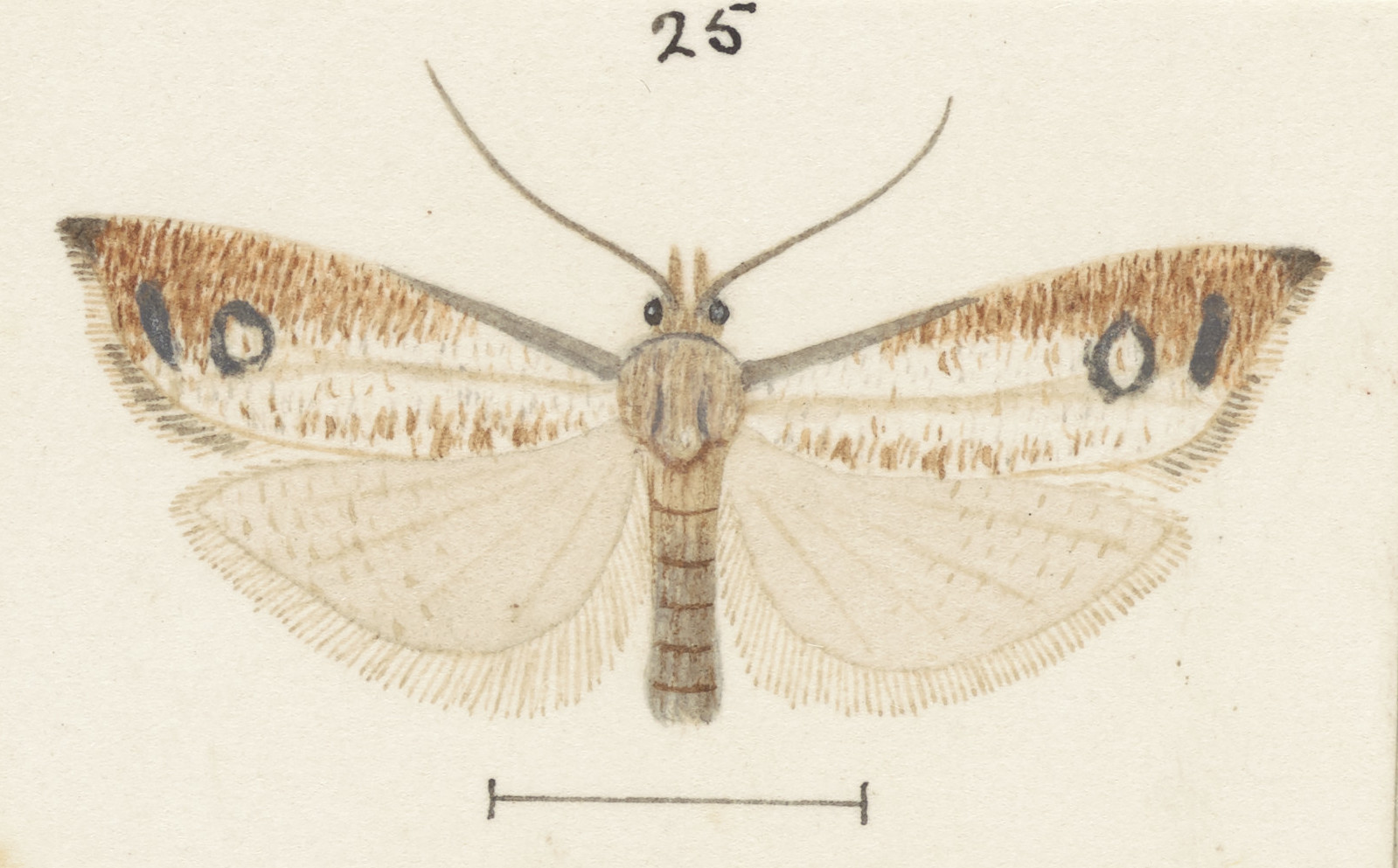
- male

Scientific classification
- Domain: Eukaryota
- Kingdom: Animalia
- Phylum: Arthropoda
- Class: Insecta
- Order: Lepidoptera
- Family: Tortricidae
- Genus: Holocola
- Species: H. dolopaea

Binomial name
- Holocola dolopaea (Meyrick, 1905)

Synonyms
- Strepsicrates dolopaea Meyrick, 1905; Spilonota dolopaea (Meyrick, 1905); Stictea dolopaea (Meyrick, 1905)

= Holocola dolopaea =

Species of moth endemic to New Zealand

Holocola dolopaea is a species of moth in the family Tortricidae. It was first described in 1905 by Edward Meyrick. The species is endemic to New Zealand and has been observed in Whangārei, Hawkes Bay, Wellington and Christchurch. This species inhabits native forest or scrub glades. Adults are on the wing from September to December and are attracted to black light. This species is regarded as being rare.

== Taxonomy ==
This species was first described by Edward Meyrick in 1905 using a male specimen collected in Wellington by George Hudson and named Strepsicrates dolopaea. Hudson discussed this species both in his 1928 book The butterflies and moths of New Zealand as well as in the 1939 book A supplement to the butterflies and moths of New Zealand, under the name Spilonota dolopaea. The male holotype specimen is held at the Natural History Museum, London.

== Description ==
Meyrick described this species as follows:

♂. 13 mm. Head, palpi, and thorax pale greyish-ochreous irrorated with whitish. Antennae grey, suffused with whitish above, notch at about 1/8 from basal joint. Abdomen pale greyish-ochreous. Fore-wings elongate, narrow, costa moderately arched, apex round-pointed, termen sinuate, oblique, rounded beneath, costal fold reaching 2/5; pale greyish-ochreous, irrorated witli whitish and strigulated with fuscous, posteriorly more ochreous; an undefined patch of fuscous suffusion extending along costa from 2/5 to 4/5; margins of ocellus, and an angulated stria beyond it leaden-metallic : cilia pale grey irrorated with whitish. Hind-wings with 3 and 4 coincident; whitish-grey; cilia grey-whitish, with faint grey subbasal shade.

In the original description Meyrick pointed out that this species is similar in appearance to H. zopherana but is much paler and has an absence of dark markings of the later species. However in 1930 Meyrick pointed out that further specimens showed that the male has a long expansible blackish hair pencil from base lying in a dorsal fold of hindwings and that this constituted a very distinctive characteristic.

== Distribution ==
It is endemic to New Zealand. This species has been observed in Whangārei, Hawkes Bay, Wellington, and Christchurch. Both Hudson and T. H. Davies regarded this species as likely rare.

== Behaviour ==
The adults of this species are on the wing in September to December. They are attracted to black light.

== Habitat and hosts ==
This species inhabits native forest or scrub glades.
