= Neohermenias =

Scientific classification
- Kingdom: Animalia
- Phylum: Arthropoda
- Class: Insecta
- Order: Lepidoptera
- Family: Tortricidae
- Tribe: Eucosmini
- Genus: Neohermenias; Diakonoff, 1966

Genus of tortrix moths

Neohermenias is a genus of moths belonging to the subfamily Olethreutinae of the family Tortricidae.

== Species ==
- Neohermenias melanocopa (Meyrick, 1912)
- Neohermenias thalassitis (Meyrick, 1910)

== Taxonomy ==
The genus is listed as a synonym of Holocola by some authors.

== See also ==
- List of Tortricidae genera
