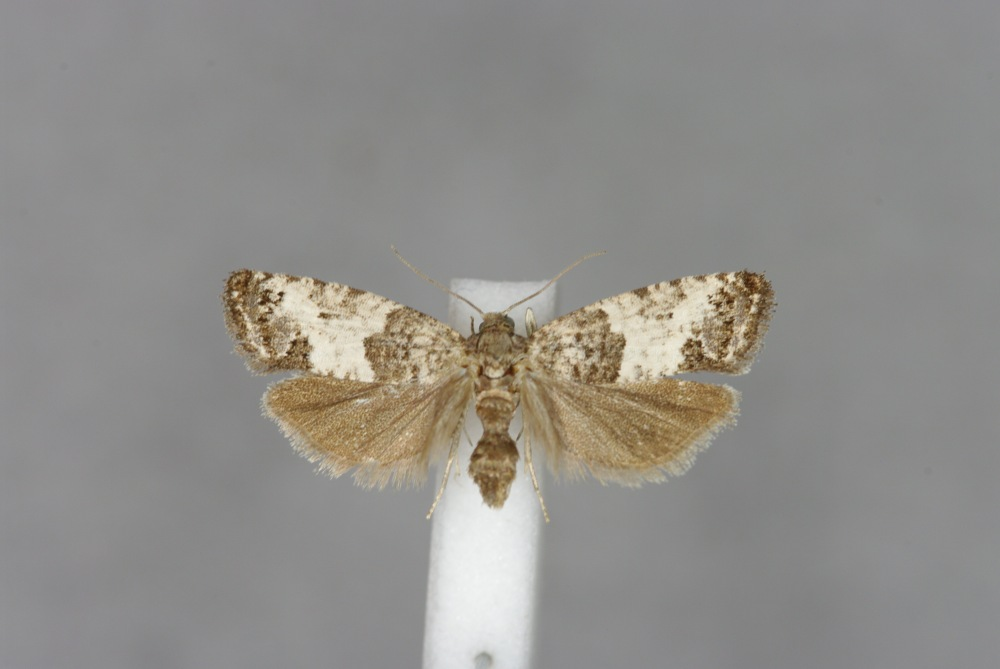
- Spilonota ocellana

Scientific classification
- Domain: Eukaryota
- Kingdom: Animalia
- Phylum: Arthropoda
- Class: Insecta
- Order: Lepidoptera
- Family: Tortricidae
- Tribe: Eucosmini
- Genus: Spilonota; Stephens, 1834

Synonyms
- Bathrotoma Meyrick, 1881; Tmetocera Lederer, 1859

= Spilonota =

Genus of tortrix moths

Spilonota is a worldwide genus of moths belonging to the subfamily Olethreutinae of the family Tortricidae.

== Species ==
- Spilonota acrosema (Turner, 1946)
- Spilonota albicana (Motschulsky, 1866)
- Spilonota albitegulana Kuznetzov, 1997
- Spilonota allodapa Diakonoff, 1953
- Spilonota aphrocymba Meyrick, 1927
- Spilonota babylonica Meyrick, 1912
- Spilonota calceata (Meyrick, 1907)
- Spilonota chlorotripta Meyrick, 1921
- Spilonota conica Meyrick, 1911
- Spilonota constrictana (Meyrick, 1881)
- Spilonota cryptogramma Meyrick, 1922
- Spilonota dissoplaca (Meyrick, 1936)
- Spilonota distyliana Moriuti, 1958
- Spilonota eremitana Moriuti, 1972
- Spilonota grandlacia Razowski, 2013
- Spilonota hexametra Meyrick, 1920
- Spilonota incretata Meyrick, 1931
- Spilonota laricana (Heinemann, 1863)
- Spilonota lechriaspis Meyrick, 1932
- Spilonota lobata Diakonoff, 1953
- Spilonota melanacta (Meyrick, 1907)
- Spilonota mortuana (Walker, 1863)
- Spilonota ocellana ([Denis & Schiffermuller], 1775)
- Spilonota prognathana (Snellen, 1883)
- Spilonota pyrochlora Diakonoff, 1953
- Spilonota pyrusicola Liu & Liu, 1994
- Spilonota quietana (Meyrick, 1881)
- Spilonota ruficomana (Meyrick, 1881)
- Spilonota selene Diakonoff, 1953
- Spilonota semirufana (Christoph, 1882)
- Spilonota sinuosa Meyrick, 1917
- Spilonota terenia Razowski, 2013
- Spilonota trilithopa (Meyrick in Caradja & Meyrick, 1937)

== Former species ==
- Spilonota melanocopa (Meyrick, 1912)

== See also ==
- List of Tortricidae genera
