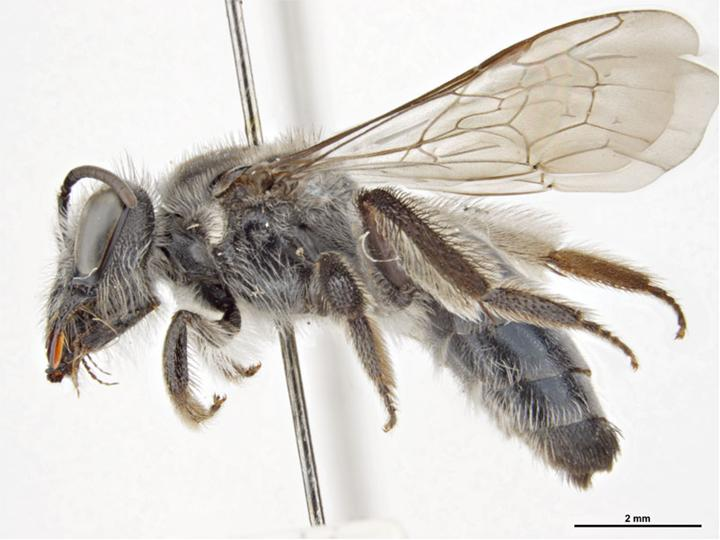
- Female

Scientific classification
- Kingdom: Animalia
- Phylum: Arthropoda
- Clade: Pancrustacea
- Class: Insecta
- Order: Hymenoptera
- Family: Colletidae
- Genus: Leioproctus
- Species: L. tuberculatus

Binomial name
- Leioproctus tuberculatus (Cockerell, 1913)

Synonyms
- Paracolletes tuberculatus Cockerell, 1913; Paracolletes fascialis Cockerell, 1921; Paracolletes tuberculatus insularis Cockerell, 1913

= Leioproctus tuberculatus =

Species of bee

Leioproctus tuberculatus, or Leioproctus (Exleycolletes) tuberculatus, is a species of bee in the family Colletidae and subfamily Colletinae. It is endemic to Australia. It was described by British-American entomologist Theodore Dru Alison Cockerell in 1913.

== Description ==
Female body length is about 11 mm, male about 10 mm. Colouration is mainly black, with white to light golden hair, and a dark bluish-green abdomen.

== Distribution and habitat ==
The species occurs in eastern Australia. Type localities include Stradbroke Island and Coolangatta in Queensland, as well as Cheltenham, Victoria.

== Behaviour ==
The adults are solitary flying mellivores that nest gregariously in the ground. Flowering plants visited by the bees include Gaudium laevigatum, as well as Acacia, Boronia, Hibbertia and Muehlenbeckia species.

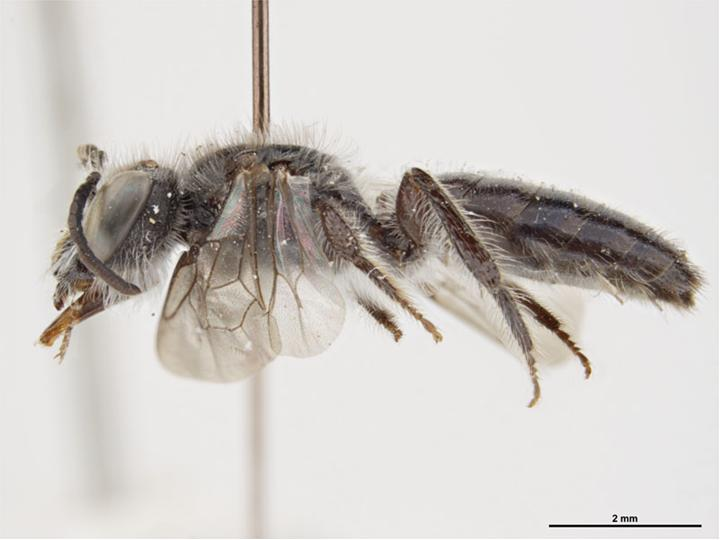
Male
