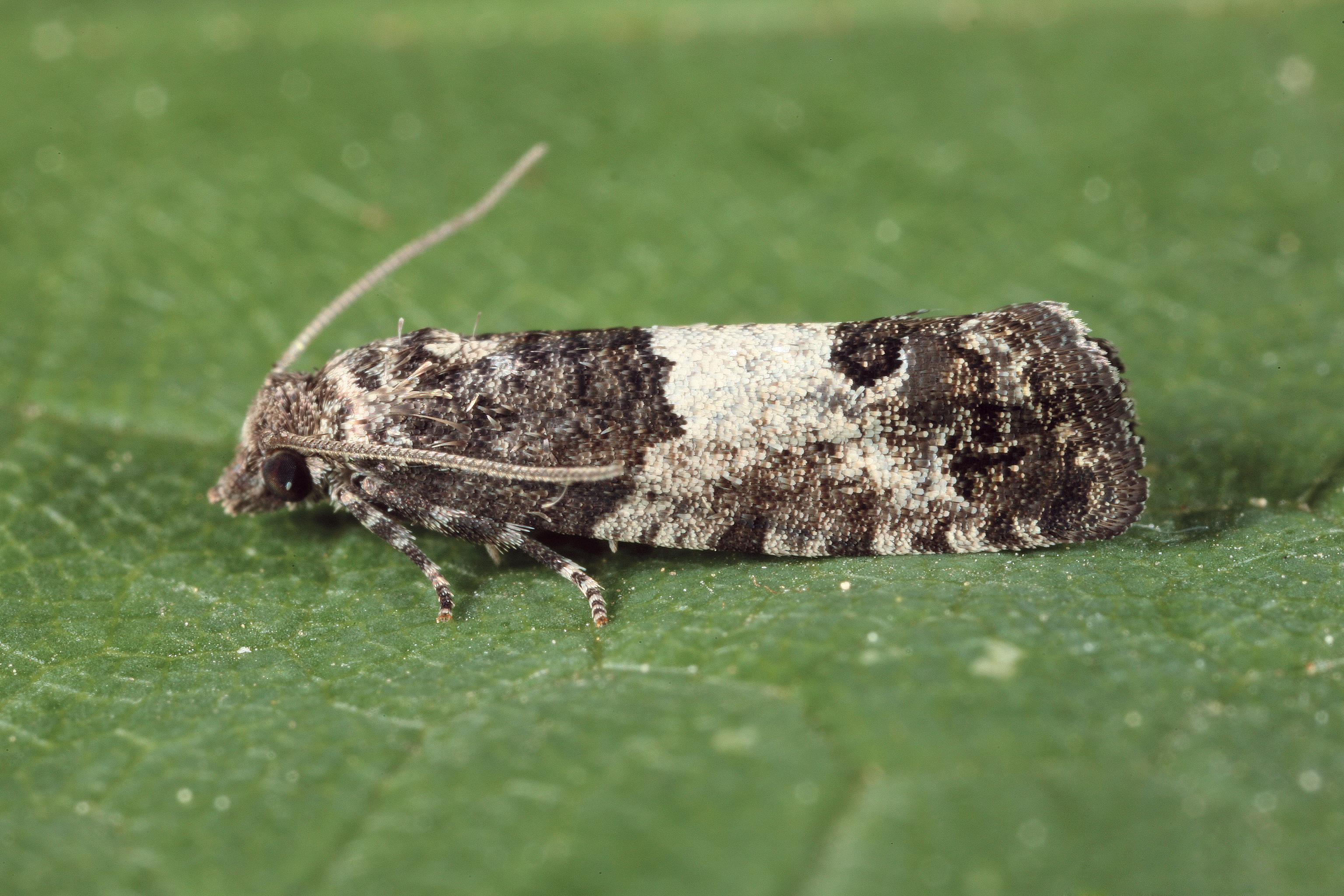

Scientific classification
- Domain: Eukaryota
- Kingdom: Animalia
- Phylum: Arthropoda
- Class: Insecta
- Order: Lepidoptera
- Family: Tortricidae
- Genus: Spilonota
- Species: S. laricana

Binomial name
- Spilonota laricana (Heinemann, 1863)

Synonyms
- Grapholitha laricana Heinemann, 1863

= Spilonota laricana =

Species of moth

Spilonota laricana is a moth of the family Tortricidae. It is found in most of Europe (except the Iberian Peninsula and the Balkan Peninsula), China, Japan, Russia and the Nearctic realm.

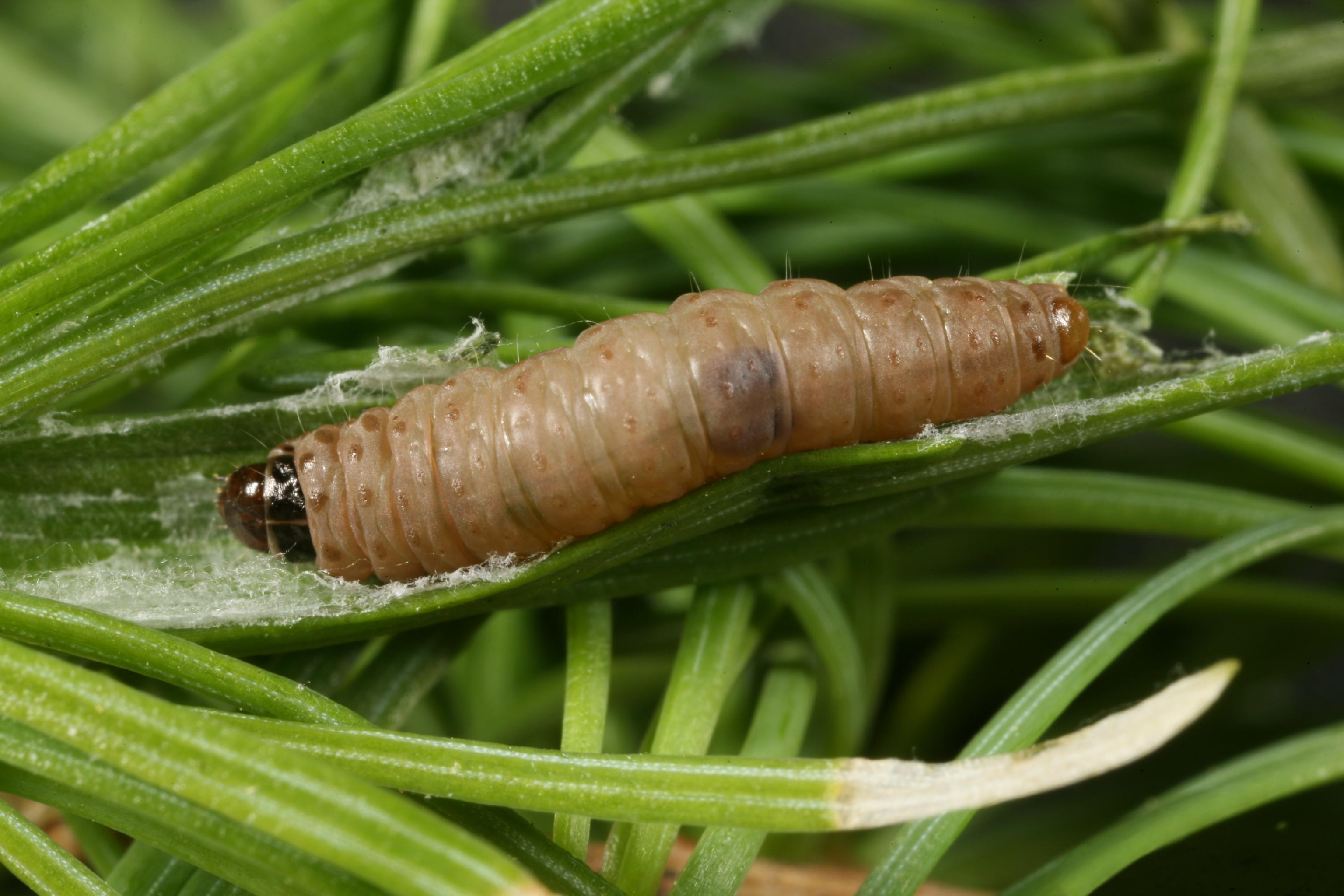
Larva

The wingspan is about 15 mm. It was formerly considered to be a forma of Spilonota ocellana Adults are on wing from June to August.

The larvae mainly feed on Larix species, but have also been recorded on other coniferous trees. Young larvae mine the needles of their host plant. After overwintering they feed on the young buds.
