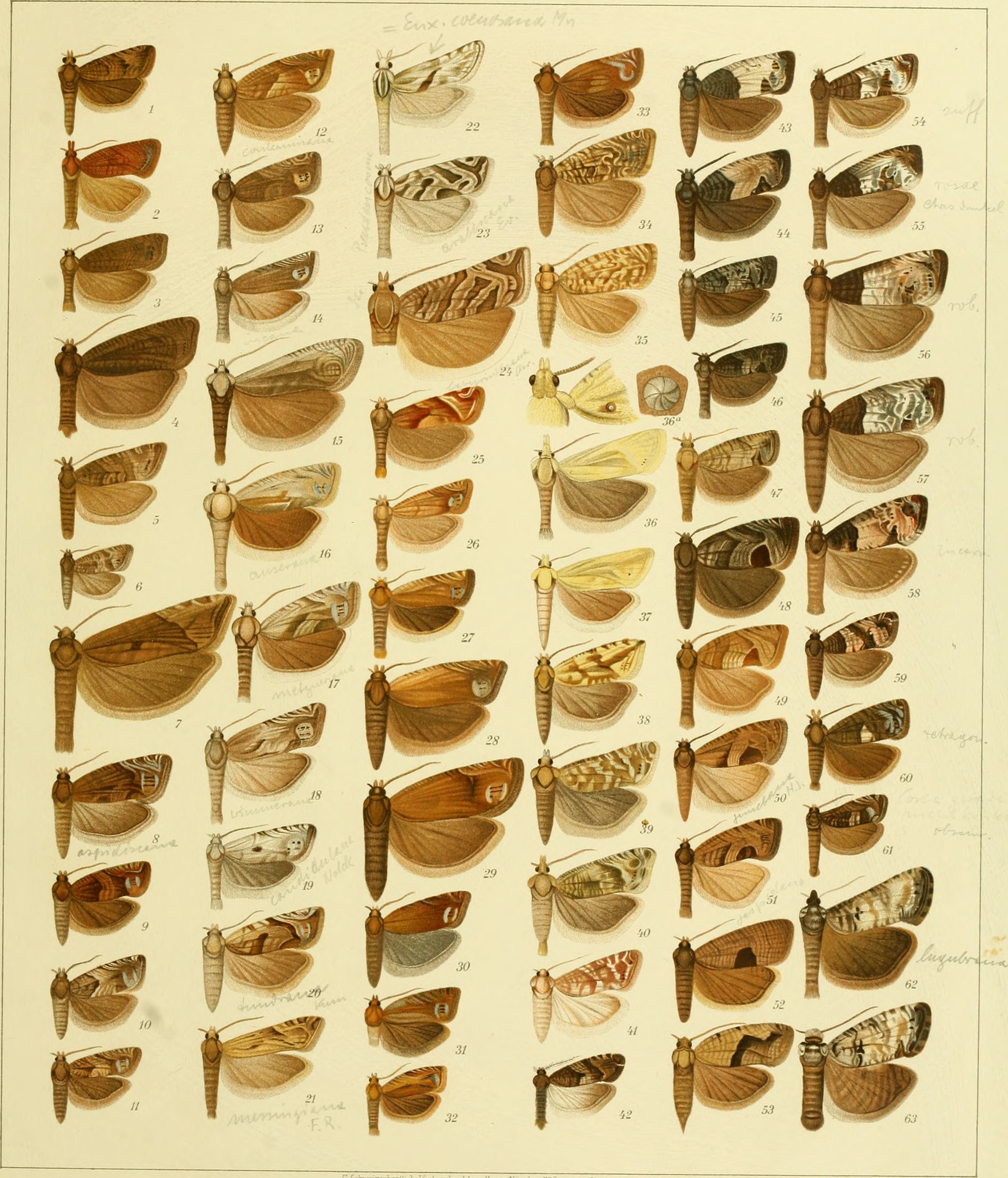
- Spilonota prognathana in Kennel Die palaearktischen tortriciden figure 47 male

Scientific classification
- Kingdom: Animalia
- Phylum: Arthropoda
- Class: Insecta
- Order: Lepidoptera
- Family: Tortricidae
- Genus: Spilonota
- Species: S. prognathana

Binomial name
- Spilonota prognathana (Snellen, 1883)

Synonyms
- Grapholitha prognathana Snellen, 1883

= Spilonota prognathana =

Species of moth

Spilonota prognathana is a species of moth of the family Tortricidae. It is found in China (Inner Mongolia), Japan and Russia.
