= Spilonota pyrusicola =

Scientific classification
- Domain: Eukaryota
- Kingdom: Animalia
- Phylum: Arthropoda
- Class: Insecta
- Order: Lepidoptera
- Family: Tortricidae
- Genus: Spilonota
- Species: S. pyrusicola

Binomial name
- Spilonota pyrusicola Liu & Liu, 1994

Species of moth

Spilonota pyrusicola is a species of moth of the family Tortricidae. It is found in China (Beijing, Liaoning, Henan).

The larvae feed on Pyrus species and Crataegus pinnatifida.
