= Spilonota terenia =

Scientific classification
- Kingdom: Animalia
- Phylum: Arthropoda
- Class: Insecta
- Order: Lepidoptera
- Family: Tortricidae
- Genus: Spilonota
- Species: S. terenia

Binomial name
- Spilonota terenia Razowski, 2013

Species of moth

Spilonota terenia is a species of moth of the family Tortricidae first described by Józef Razowski in 2013. It is found on Seram Island in Indonesia. The habitat consists of lower and upper montane forests.

The wingspan is about 16 mm.
