= Spilonota albicana =

Scientific classification
- Domain: Eukaryota
- Kingdom: Animalia
- Phylum: Arthropoda
- Class: Insecta
- Order: Lepidoptera
- Family: Tortricidae
- Genus: Spilonota
- Species: S. albicana

Binomial name
- Spilonota albicana (Motschulsky, 1866)

Synonyms
- Grapholitha albicana Motschulsky, 1866

Species of moth

Spilonota albicana, the white fruit moth, larger apple fruit moth or eye-spotted bud moth, is a species of moth of the family Tortricidae. It is found in China (Tianjin, Hebei, Heilongjiang, Zhejiang, Fujian, Henan, Hubei, Hunan, Sichuan, Guizhou, Shaanxi, Gansu), Korea, Japan (Hokkaido, Honshu) and Russia (Transbaikalia, Russian Far East). It has been accidentally introduced in the Netherlands.

The wingspan is 13–15 mm. Adults are on wing from mid-May to June and from mid-July to the end of August in two generations per year.

The larvae feed on Malus pumila, Malus sieboldii, Malus mandshurica, Malus pallasiana, Photinia glabra, Pyrus species, Armeniaca vulgaris, Amygdalus persica, Prunus salicina, Prunus serrulata var. spontanea, Cerasus pseudocerasus, Cerasus tomentosa, Cotoneaster melanocarpus, Crataegus pinnatifida, Crataegus dahurica, Crataegus maximowiczii, Sorbus amurensis, Larix leptolepis, Larix gmelini and Corylus heterophylla.
