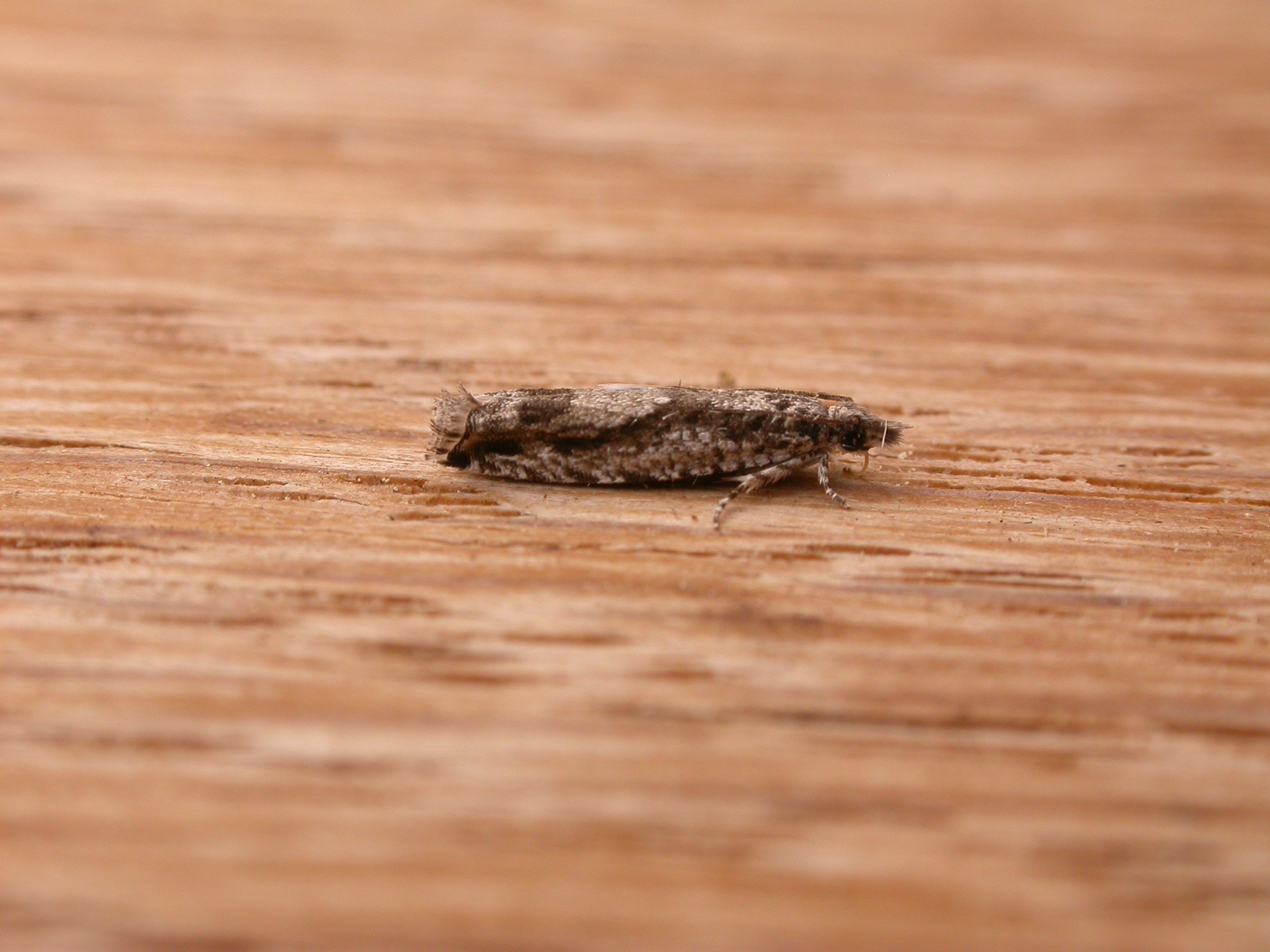

Scientific classification
- Kingdom: Animalia
- Phylum: Arthropoda
- Class: Insecta
- Order: Lepidoptera
- Family: Tortricidae
- Genus: Holocola
- Species: H. thalassinana

Binomial name
- Holocola thalassinana Meyrick, 1881

= Holocola thalassinana =

Species of moth

Holocola thalassinana is a moth of the family Tortricidae. It is known from Australia.

The larvae feed on Leptospermum species, (including Leptospermum laevigatum) and Melaleuca quinquenervia.
