= Spilonota grandlacia =

Scientific classification
- Kingdom: Animalia
- Phylum: Arthropoda
- Class: Insecta
- Order: Lepidoptera
- Family: Tortricidae
- Genus: Spilonota
- Species: S. grandlacia

Binomial name
- Spilonota grandlacia Razowski, 2013

Species of moth

Spilonota grandlacia is a species of moth of the family Tortricidae. It is found in New Caledonia in the south-west Pacific Ocean.

The wingspan is about 14 mm.
