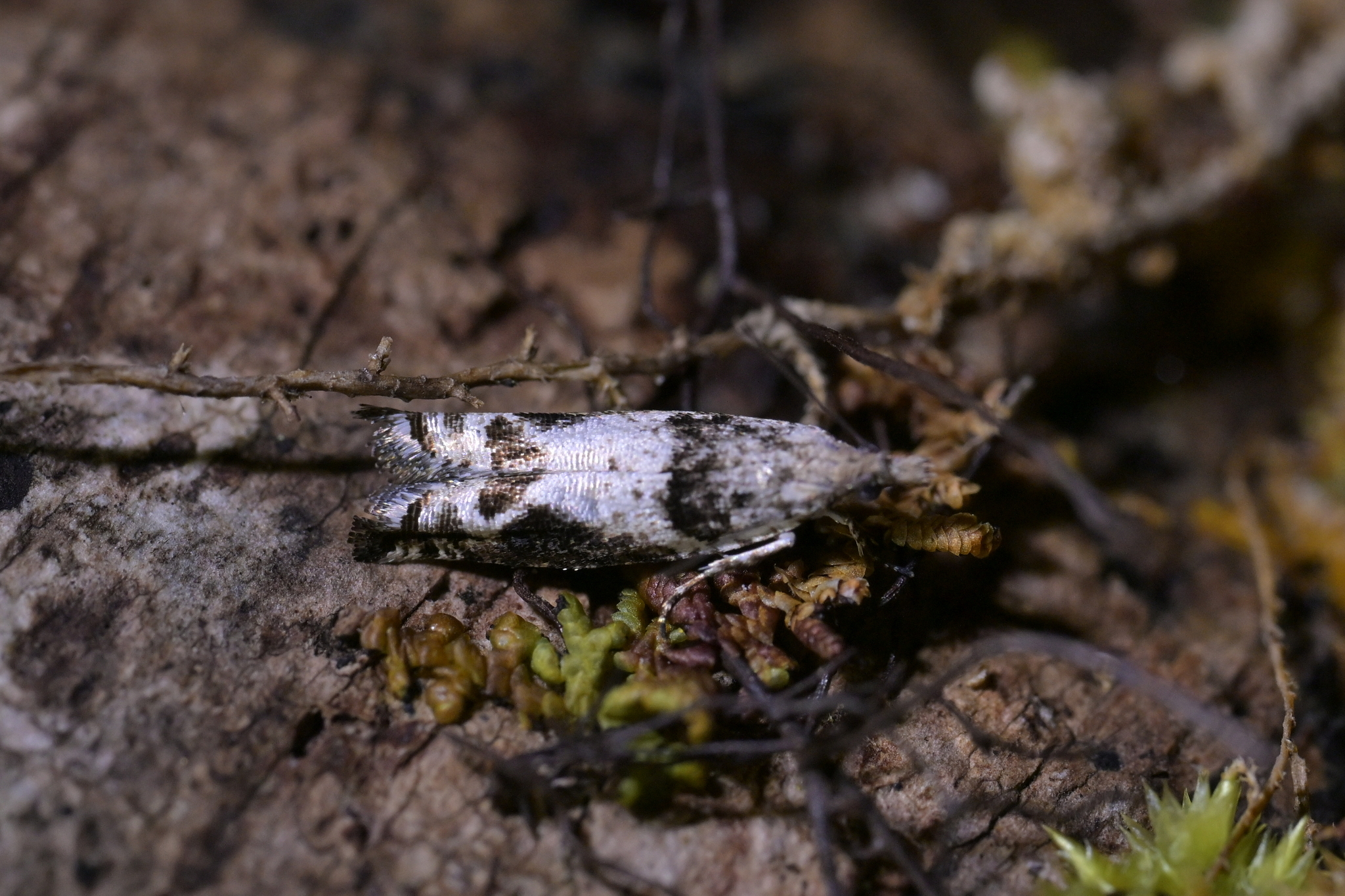

Scientific classification
- Kingdom: Animalia
- Phylum: Arthropoda
- Clade: Pancrustacea
- Class: Insecta
- Order: Lepidoptera
- Family: Tortricidae
- Genus: Holocola
- Species: H. emplasta

Binomial name
- Holocola emplasta (Meyrick, 1901)

Synonyms
- Strepsicrates emplasta Meyrick, 1901; Spilonota emplasta (Meyrick, 1901); Stictea emplasta (Meyrick, 1901)

= Holocola emplasta =

Species of moth endemic to New Zealand

Holocola emplasta is a species of moth in the family Tortricidae. This species is endemic to New Zealand and has been observed in the South Island. The larval hosts are species within the genus Coprosma. Adults of the species are on the wing during the New Zealand spring months.

== Taxonomy ==
This species was first described by Edward Meyrick in 1901 using a female specimen collected at West Plains, Invercargill by Alfred Philpott, and named Strepsicrates emplasta. George Hudson discussed this species in his 1928 book The butterflies and moths of New Zealand. However in doing so he confused this species with a form of Holocola zopherana. He corrected this error in his 1939 book A supplement to the butterflies and moths of New Zealand. The female holotype is held at the Natural History Museum, London.

== Description ==
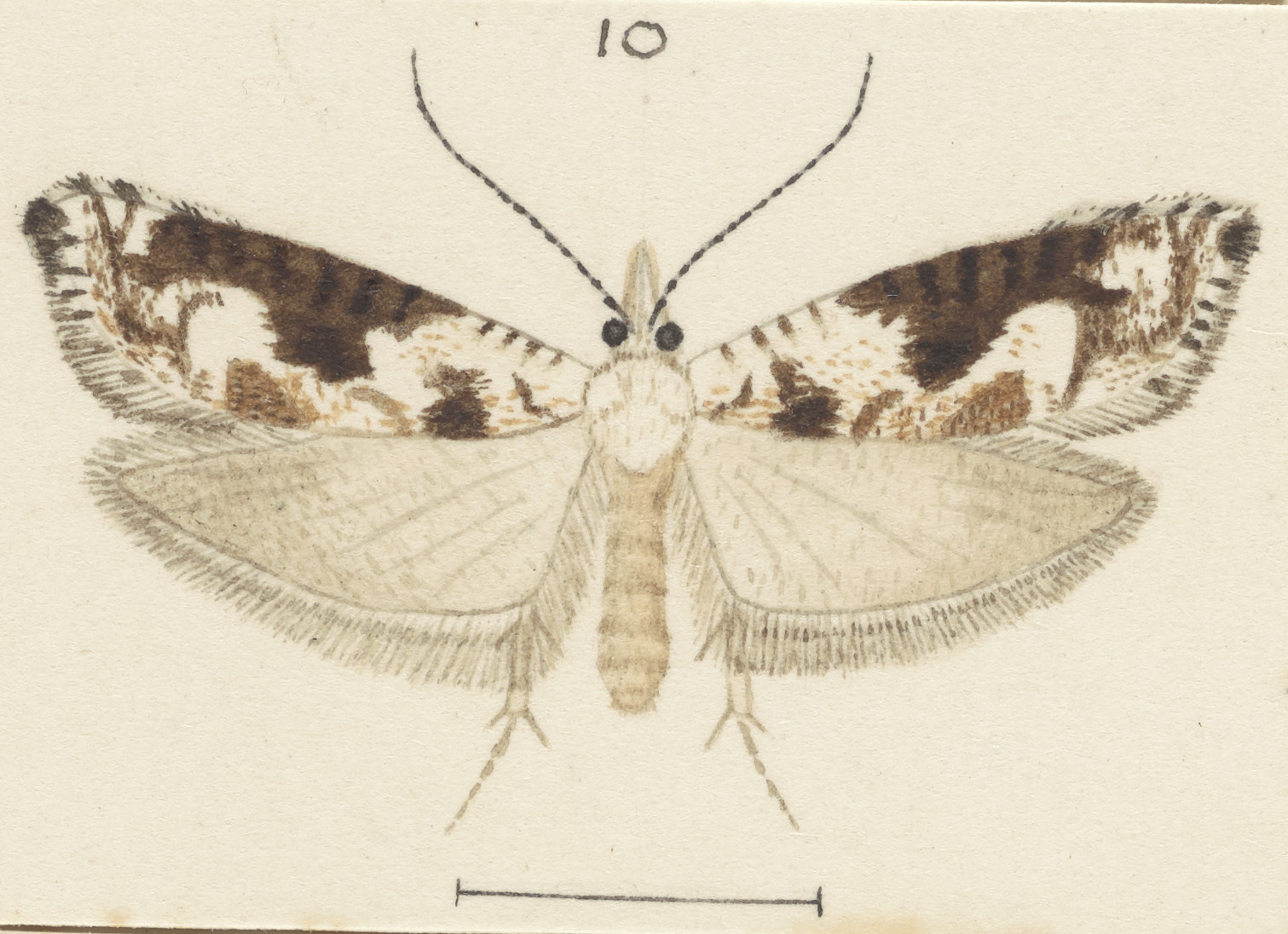
Species illustrated by Hudson.

Hudson described the species as follows:

The expansion of the wings is 1/2 inch (13 mm.). The fore-wings are shining white; several dark brown strigulae on costa near base; a very large, irregular, shining chocolate-brown patch on costa near middle, almost reaching apex; several fine strigulae beyond this; a smaller brown patch on dorsum at about 1/3; many faint pale brown marks, especially towards dorsum and termen; cilia brownish-grey with a broken white basal line and blackish-brown spot at apex. Hind-wings and cilia pale brownish-grey, darker towards apex; veins 3 and 4 coincident.

This species has been confused with the similar appearing Holocola zopherana however H. emplasta can be distinguished as it is slightly larger and has a large blackish-fuscous patch on the middle third of the forewing costa.

== Distribution ==
This species is endemic to New Zealand. As well as the type locality of West Plains, Invercargill, this species has been observed in the Canterbury and Nelson regions.

== Behaviour ==
Adults of this species are on the wing during the New Zealand spring months.

== Habitat and host species ==
This species inhabits dense or swampy native forest. The larval hosts of this moth are species within the plant genus Coprosma.
