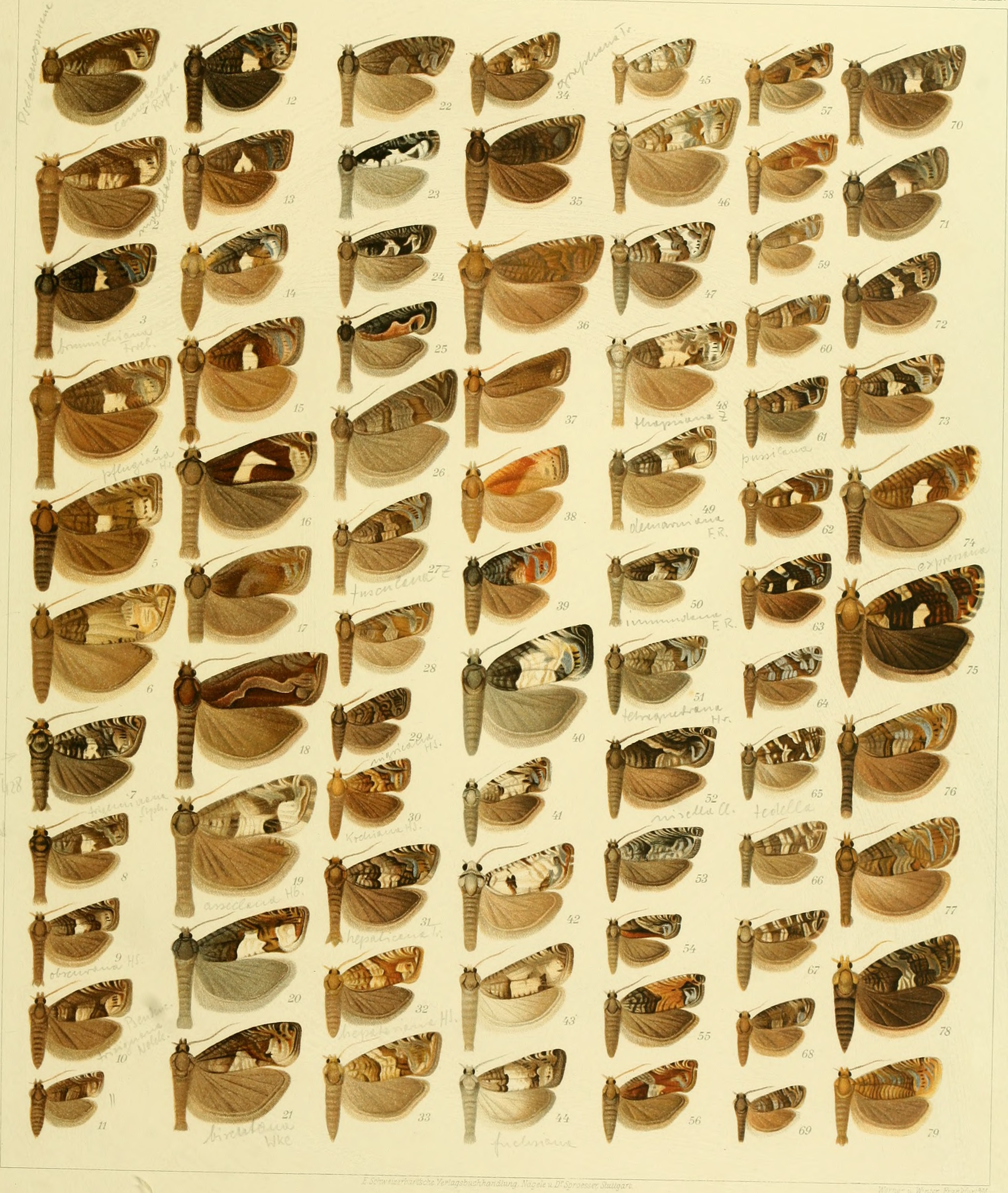
- Spilonota semirufana in Die palaearktischen tortriciden (figure 38)

Scientific classification
- Domain: Eukaryota
- Kingdom: Animalia
- Phylum: Arthropoda
- Class: Insecta
- Order: Lepidoptera
- Family: Tortricidae
- Genus: Spilonota
- Species: S. semirufana

Binomial name
- Spilonota semirufana (Christoph, 1882)

Synonyms
- Grapholitha semirufana Christoph, 1882; Spilonota ochrea Kuznetzov, 1966

= Spilonota semirufana =

Species of moth

Spilonota semirufana is a species of moth of the family Tortricidae. It is found in China (Tianjin, Jilin, Heilongjiang, Henan), Korea, Japan and Russia.
