= Neohermenias thalassitis =

Scientific classification
- Kingdom: Animalia
- Phylum: Arthropoda
- Class: Insecta
- Order: Lepidoptera
- Family: Tortricidae
- Genus: Neohermenias
- Species: N. thalassitis

Binomial name
- Neohermenias thalassitis (Meyrick, 1910)

Synonyms
- Spilonota thalassitis Meyrick, 1910

Species of moth

Neohermenias thalassitis is a moth of the family Tortricidae. It is found in Thailand and Java.
