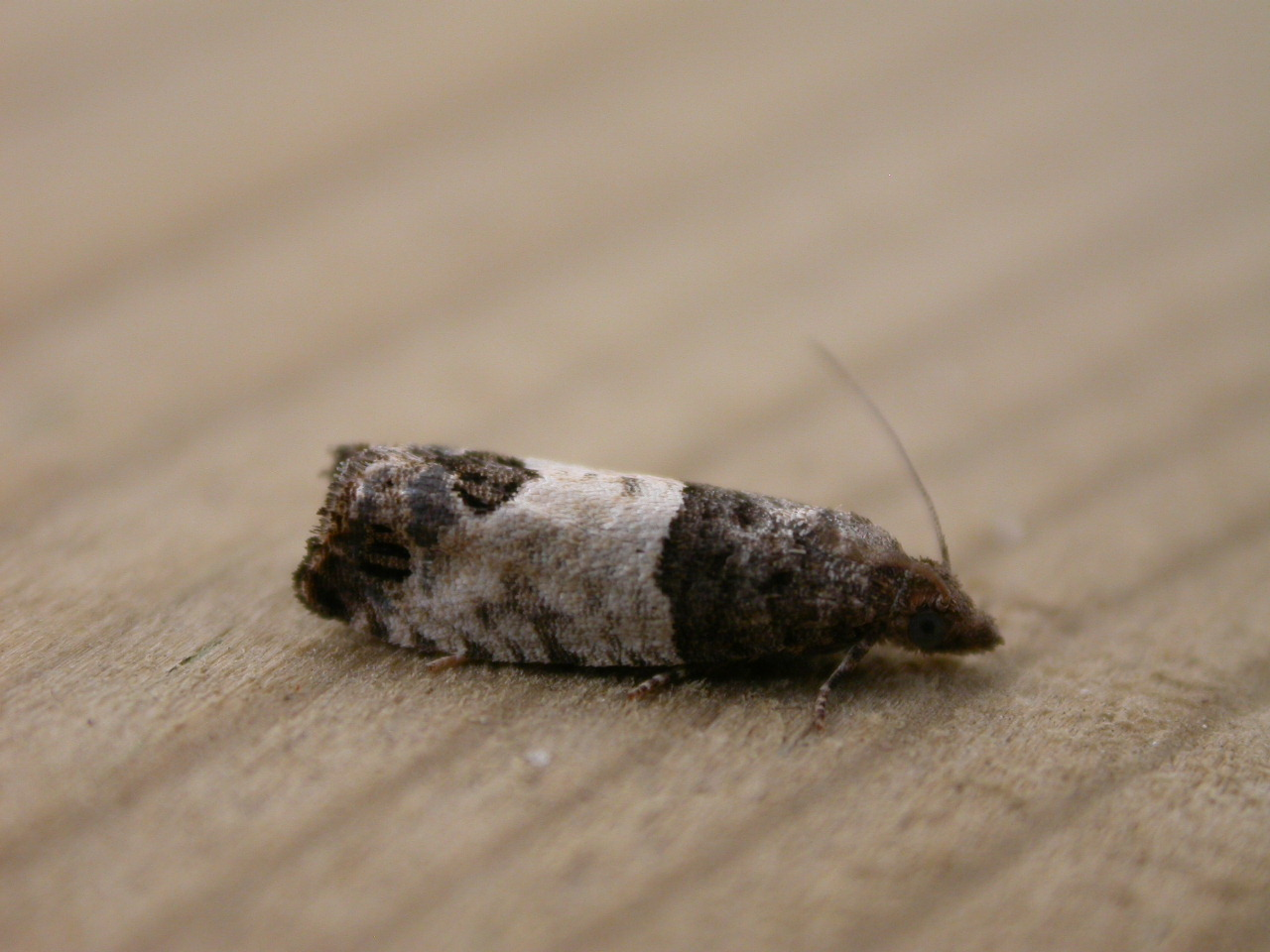

Scientific classification
- Domain: Eukaryota
- Kingdom: Animalia
- Phylum: Arthropoda
- Class: Insecta
- Order: Lepidoptera
- Family: Tortricidae
- Genus: Spilonota
- Species: S. ocellana

Binomial name
- Spilonota ocellana (Denis & Schiffermüller, 1775)

Synonyms
- Tortrix ocellana [Denis & Schiffermuller], 1775; Spilonota ocellana centralasiae Obraztsov, 1949; Tortrix comitana Hubner, [1796-1799]; Pyralis luscana Fabricius, 1794; Penthina occulana Harris, 1862; Hedya pyrifoliana Clemens, 1860; Tmetocera zellerana Borgmann, 1895

= Spilonota ocellana =

Bud moth

Spilonota ocellana, the bud moth, is a moth of the family Tortricidae. It is found in the Palearctic realm, from North Africa and Europe to Iran, eastern Russia, China (Hebei, Inner Mongolia, Jilin, Zhejiang, Fujian, Hubei, Sichuan, Shaanxi, Gansu, and Qinghai), Korea, and Japan. It is also present on Madeira and in North America.

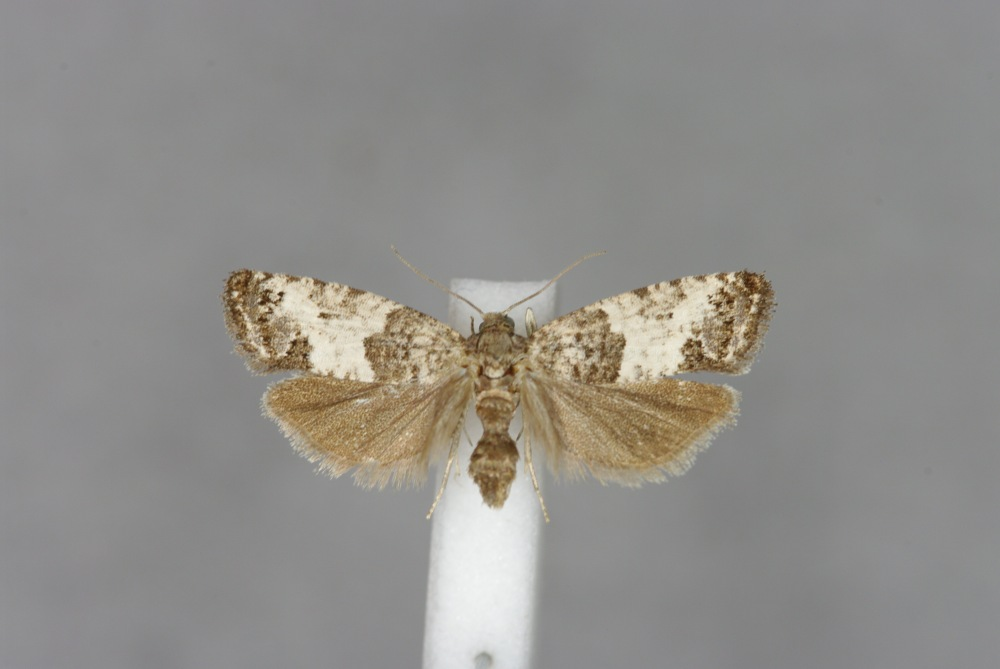
Museum specimen

The wingspan is 12–17 mm. The forewings are whitish, sometimes partly suffused with grey, more or less strigulated with dark fuscous. The basal patch is dark grey, sometimes blackish-mixed, edge somewhat angulated and the central fascia form a dark grey sometimes indistinct costal suffusion, and there is a black-edged triangular praetornal spot. The ocellus is edged with leaden- metallic, enclosing several sometimes confluent black dashes. The cilia are dark grey. The hindwings are rather dark grey. The larva is pinkish-brown; head and plate of 2 dark fuscous: on blackthorn, larch, alder, etc.; May. The larch -feeding form distinguished as lariciana is usually somewhat smaller and darker.

The moth flies from May to October depending on the location. There is one generation per year.

The larvae feed on various deciduous trees and shrubs including Quercus, Betula, Sorbus and Vaccinium.
