= Spilonota trilithopa =

Scientific classification
- Kingdom: Animalia
- Phylum: Arthropoda
- Class: Insecta
- Order: Lepidoptera
- Family: Tortricidae
- Genus: Spilonota
- Species: S. trilithopa

Binomial name
- Spilonota trilithopa (Meyrick, 1937)

Synonyms
- Eucosma trilithopa Meyrick, 1937

Species of moth

Spilonota trilithopa is a species of moth of the family Tortricidae. It is found in Yunnan, China.
