= Spilonota eremitana =

Larch leafroller

Scientific classification
- Kingdom: Animalia
- Phylum: Arthropoda
- Class: Insecta
- Order: Lepidoptera
- Family: Tortricidae
- Genus: Spilonota
- Species: S. eremitana

Binomial name
- Spilonota eremitana Moriuti, 1972

Species of moth

Spilonota eremitana, the larch leafroller, is a moth of the family Tortricidae. It is found in Japan (Hokkaido, Honshu), China (Heilongjiang, Anhui, Henan, Hubei, Guizhou), Russia and the Korean Peninsula.

Its wingspan is 11–15 mm.

The larvae feed on Larix leptolepis, Larix dahurica var. japonica, Larix dahurica var. olgensis and Larix decidua. It is considered an important pest of larch. Trees are completely defoliated when outbreaks occur.
