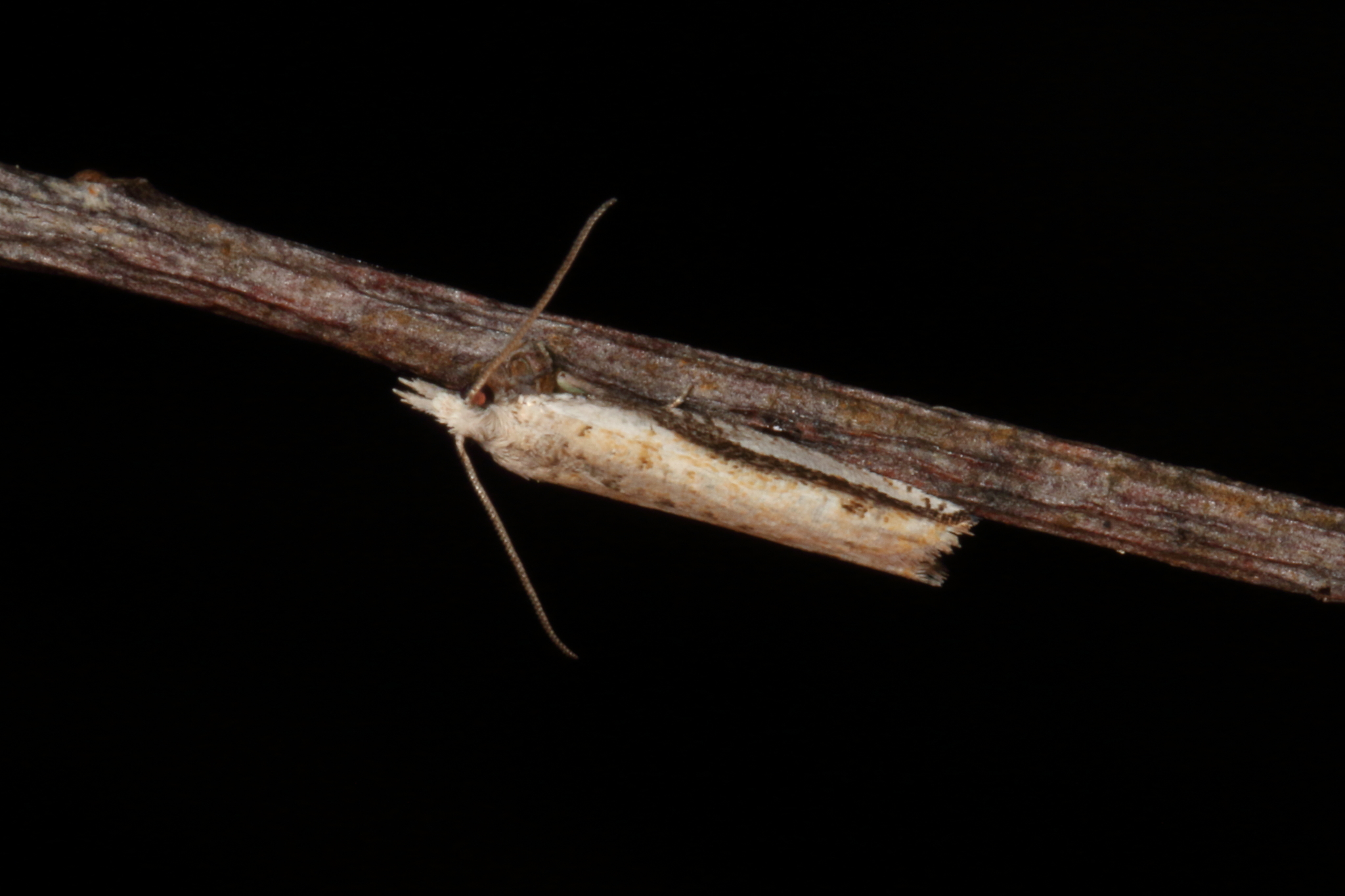

Scientific classification
- Kingdom: Animalia
- Phylum: Arthropoda
- Clade: Pancrustacea
- Class: Insecta
- Order: Lepidoptera
- Family: Tortricidae
- Genus: Holocola
- Species: H. parthenia

Binomial name
- Holocola parthenia (Meyrick, 1888)

Synonyms
- Strepsicrates parthenia Meyrick, 1888; Spilonota parthenia (Meyrick, 1888); Stictea parthenia (Meyrick, 1888)

= Holocola parthenia =

Species of moth endemic to New Zealand

Holocola parthenia is a species of moth in the family Tortricidae. It is endemic to New Zealand and has been observed in the North, South and the Chatham Islands. Larvae feed on Leucopogon fasciculatus. This moth is one of the earliest to emerge in the New Zealand spring with adults being observed from August to December. Adults are attracted to light.

== Taxonomy ==
This species was first described by Edward Meyrick in 1888 and named Strepsicrates parthenia. He used two specimens collected in December in the Waitākere Ranges beaten from a small leaved shrub in kauri forest. George Hudson discussed this species both in his 1928 book The butterflies and moths of New Zealand as well as in the 1939 book A supplement to the butterflies and moths of New Zealand, under the name Spilonota parthenia. In 2010 the Inventory of New Zealand Biodiversity listed this species under the name Holocola parthenia. The male lectotype is held at the Natural History Museum, London.

== Description ==
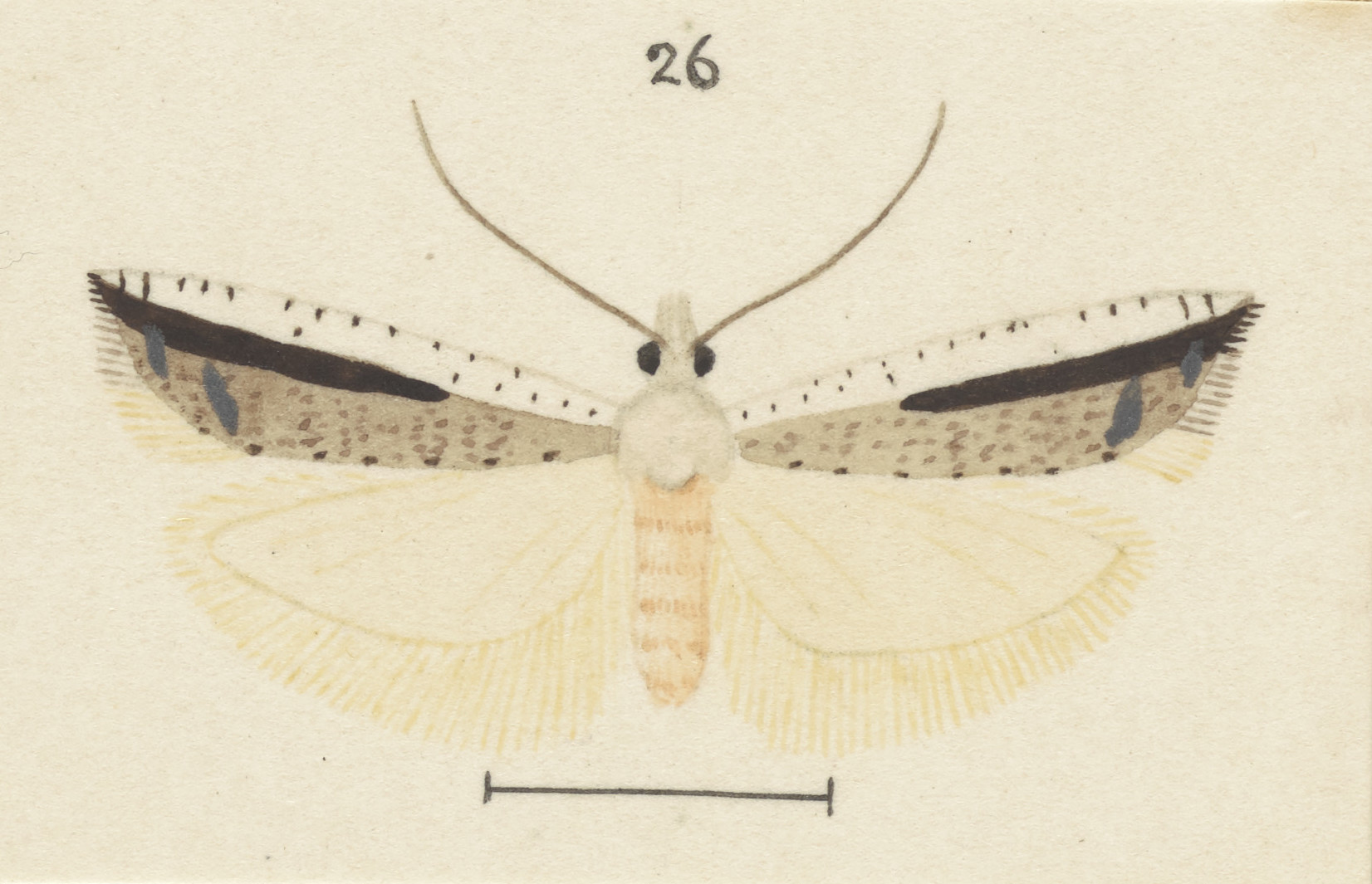
Illustration of H. parthenia by Hudson.

Meyrick described this species as follows:

Female. — 13 mm. Head, palpi, antennae, and thorax whitish. Abdomen grey-whitish. Legs dark fuscous, ringed with whitish, posterior pair whitish. Forewings elongate, costa moderately arched, apex round-pointed, hindmargin sinuate, rather strongly oblique; light brownish-ochreous, tinged with grey towards inner margin; a broad white streak along costa from base to apex, extremities pointed, margined beneath by a blackish streak from before middle to apex; about eight fine short dark fuscous strigulae on posterior half of costa; an erect leaden-metallic streak from anal angle, and another from middle of hindmargin, both touching margin of costal streak : cilia pale brownish-ochreous, with a blackish apical spot. Hindwings grey-whitish; cilia whitish.

The black markings on the adults of this species is variable both in colour intensity and the extent of the markings.

== Distribution ==
This species is endemic to New Zealand. As well as its type locality of the Waitākere Ranges in the Auckland Region, it has also been observed in Whangārei, Wellington and in Southland.

== Behaviour ==
The adults of this species have been observed on the wing from August to December. It is one of the earliest moths to emerge in the New Zealand spring and as such is often overlooked or under collected by entomologists. Adults of this species are attracted to light.

== Habitat and host species ==
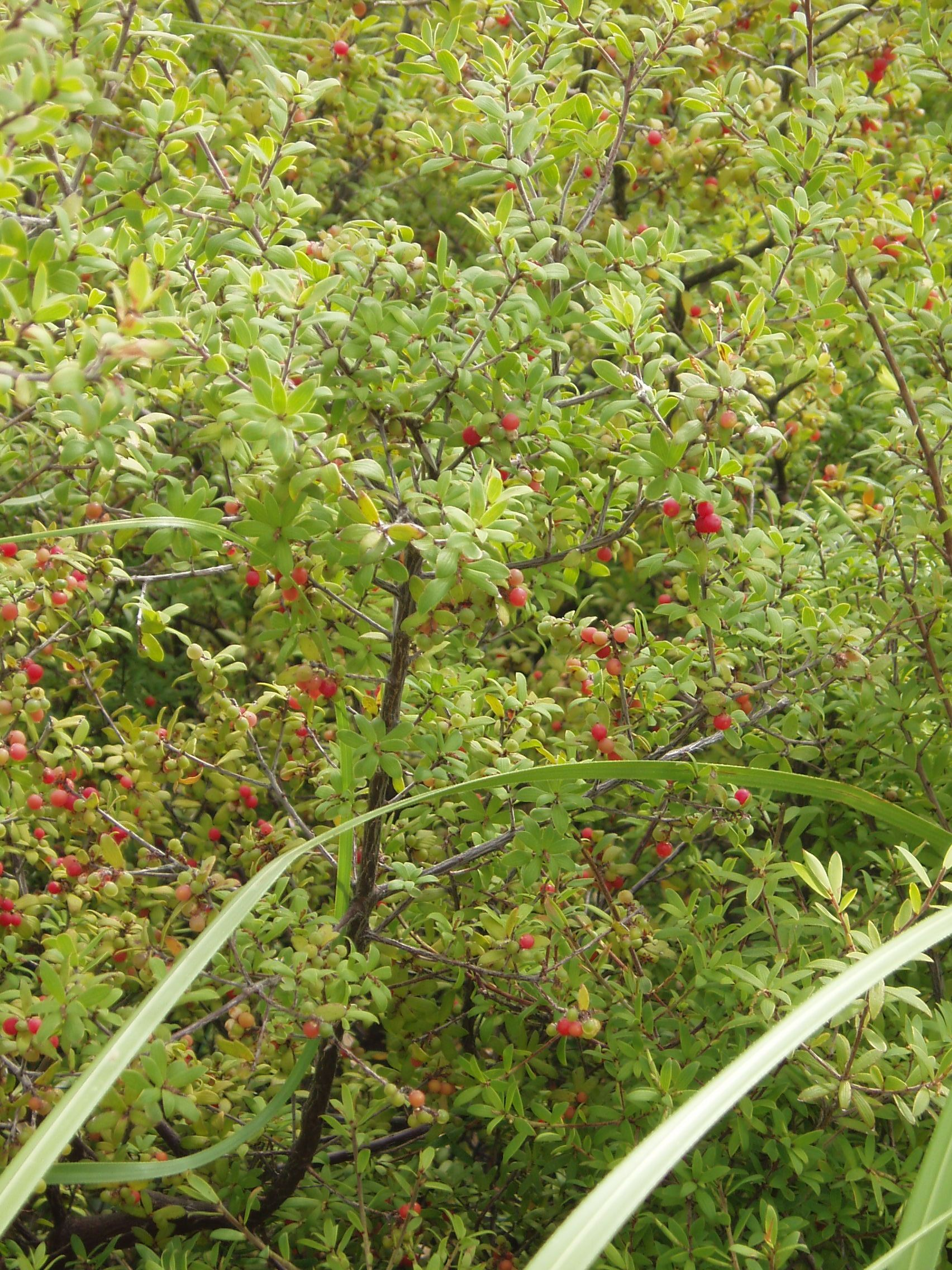
Leucopogon fasciculatus, the larval host species.

This species inhabits native scrub or bush locations. The larval host of H. parthenia is Leucopogon fasciculatus.
