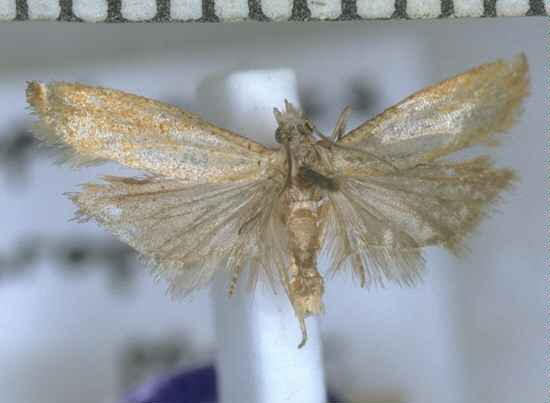
- Male lectotype

Scientific classification
- Kingdom: Animalia
- Phylum: Arthropoda
- Class: Insecta
- Order: Lepidoptera
- Family: Tortricidae
- Genus: Holocola
- Species: H. charopa

Binomial name
- Holocola charopa (Meyrick, 1888)

Synonyms
- Strepsicrates charopa Meyrick, 1888; Spilonota charopa (Meyrick, 1888); Stictea charopa (Meyrick, 1888)

= Holocola charopa =

Species of moth endemic to New Zealand

Holocola charopa is a species of moth in the family Tortricidae. It was first described by Edward Meyrick in 1888. It is endemic to New Zealand and has been observed in the northern parts of the North Island. The larvae web together and feed on the new shoots of their host plant Kunzea ericoides. Adults are on the wing in July and from November until February.

== Taxonomy ==
This species was first described by Edward Meyrick in 1888, using two specimens collected in Auckland and Whanganui in December, and was originally named Strepsicrates charopa. George Hudson discussed this species both in his 1928 book The butterflies and moths of New Zealand as well as in the 1939 book A supplement to the butterflies and moths of New Zealand, under the name Spilonota charopa. In 2010 the New Zealand Inventory of Biodiversity listed this species as being placed in the genus Holocola. The lectotype is held at the Natural History Museum, London.

== Description ==
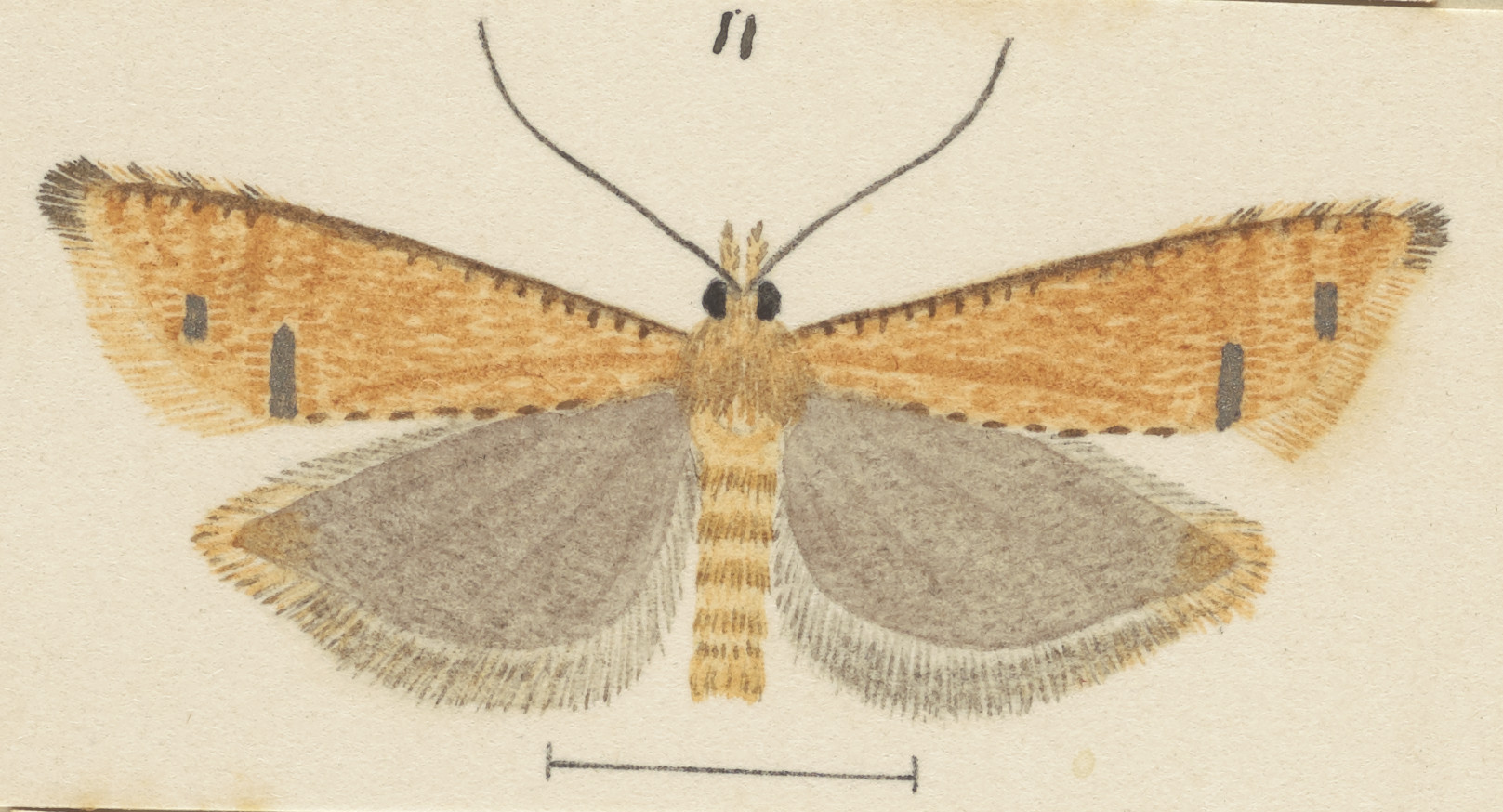
Illustration of species by G. Hudson

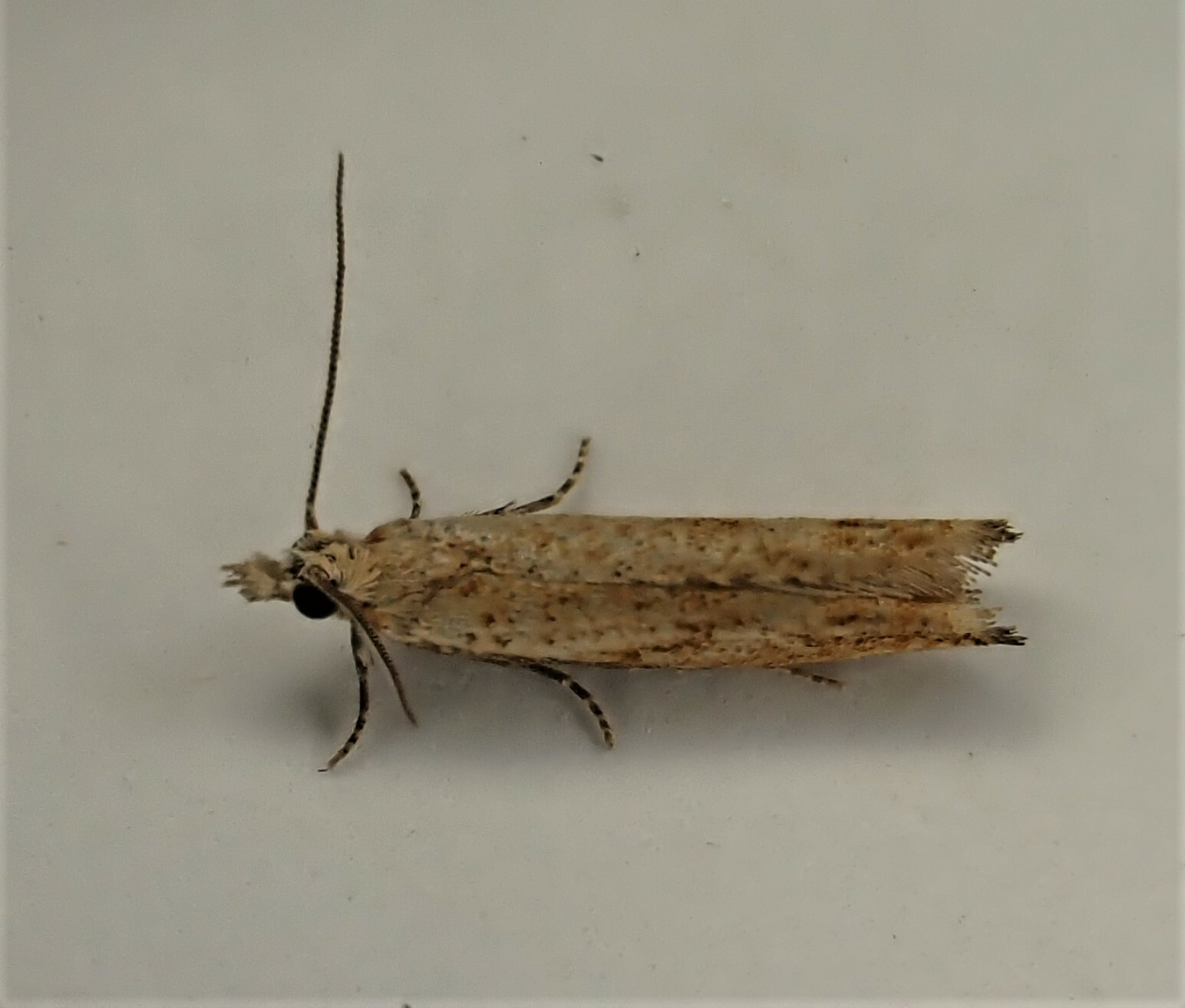
Living specimen of Holocola charopa.

Meyrick described this species as follows:

Male. — 11-12 mm. Head, palpi, and thorax pale ochreous. Antennae grey, notched at 1/8. Abdomen light grey, anal tuft whitish-ochreous. Legs grey, ringed with whitish-ochreous. Forewings elongate, narrow, costa gently arched, apex tolerably pointed, hindmargin slightly sinuate, rather strongly oblique; pale ochreous, somewhat suffused with deeper ochreous; a few fine scattered dark fuscous scales; a short leaden-metallic erect streak from anal angle, and a similar one before middle of hindmargin : cilia light ochreous, with an ill-defined blackish apical spot. Hindwings grey, apex tinged with whitish-ochreous; cilia grey-whitish, with a cloudy darker line.

== Distribution ==
This species is endemic to New Zealand and is found in the northern parts of the North Island. This species is regarded as being relatively common in and around Auckland and has also been observed in Whangārei.

== Behaviour ==
The larvae of this species web together and feed on the emerging shoots of their host plant. Adults have been recorded on the wing in July and from November until February.

== Host species ==
The larval hosts of this moth are species within the plant genus Leptospermum. Larvae of this species have also been successfully raised on the plant species Kunzea ericoides.
