= Spilonota lechriaspis =

Apple fruit licker

Scientific classification
- Kingdom: Animalia
- Phylum: Arthropoda
- Class: Insecta
- Order: Lepidoptera
- Family: Tortricidae
- Genus: Spilonota
- Species: S. lechriaspis

Binomial name
- Spilonota lechriaspis Meyrick, 1932

Species of moth

Spilonota lechriaspis, the apple fruit licker, is a moth of the family Tortricidae. It is found in eastern Russia, China (Tianjin, Hebei, Heilongjiang, Fujian, Henan, Shaanxi), the Korean Peninsula and Japan.

The wingspan is 12–16 mm. There are one or two generations per year. Larvae hibernate in the western part of Korea.

The larvae feed on Malus, Pyrus, Hall's crab, loquat, Chinese bush, Pyracantha angustifolia and Pyracantha coccinea. It is a common pest of apple and pear.

== E.L. ==
- Eurasian Tortricidae
