= Holocola melanographa =

Scientific classification
- Kingdom: Animalia
- Phylum: Arthropoda
- Clade: Pancrustacea
- Class: Insecta
- Order: Lepidoptera
- Family: Tortricidae
- Genus: Holocola
- Species: H. melanographa

Binomial name
- Holocola melanographa (Turner, 1916)

Synonyms
- Bathrotoma melanographa Turner, 1916

Species of moth

Holocola melanographa is a species of moth of the family Tortricidae. It is found in Australia, where it has been recorded from New South Wales.

The wingspan is about 16 mm. The forewings are whitish, mixed with fuscous grey, suffused with brownish in the middle of the disc and with a blackish median streak. The hindwings are grey.
