= Neohermenias melanocopa =

Scientific classification
- Kingdom: Animalia
- Phylum: Arthropoda
- Class: Insecta
- Order: Lepidoptera
- Family: Tortricidae
- Genus: Neohermenias
- Species: N. melanocopa

Binomial name
- Neohermenias melanocopa (Meyrick, 1912)

Synonyms
- Enarmonia melanocopa Meyrick, 1912; Spilonota melanocopa

Species of moth

Neohermenias melanocopa is a moth of the family Tortricidae. It is found in India, Taiwan, New Guinea, China and Japan.

The wingspan is 14.5–17 mm.
