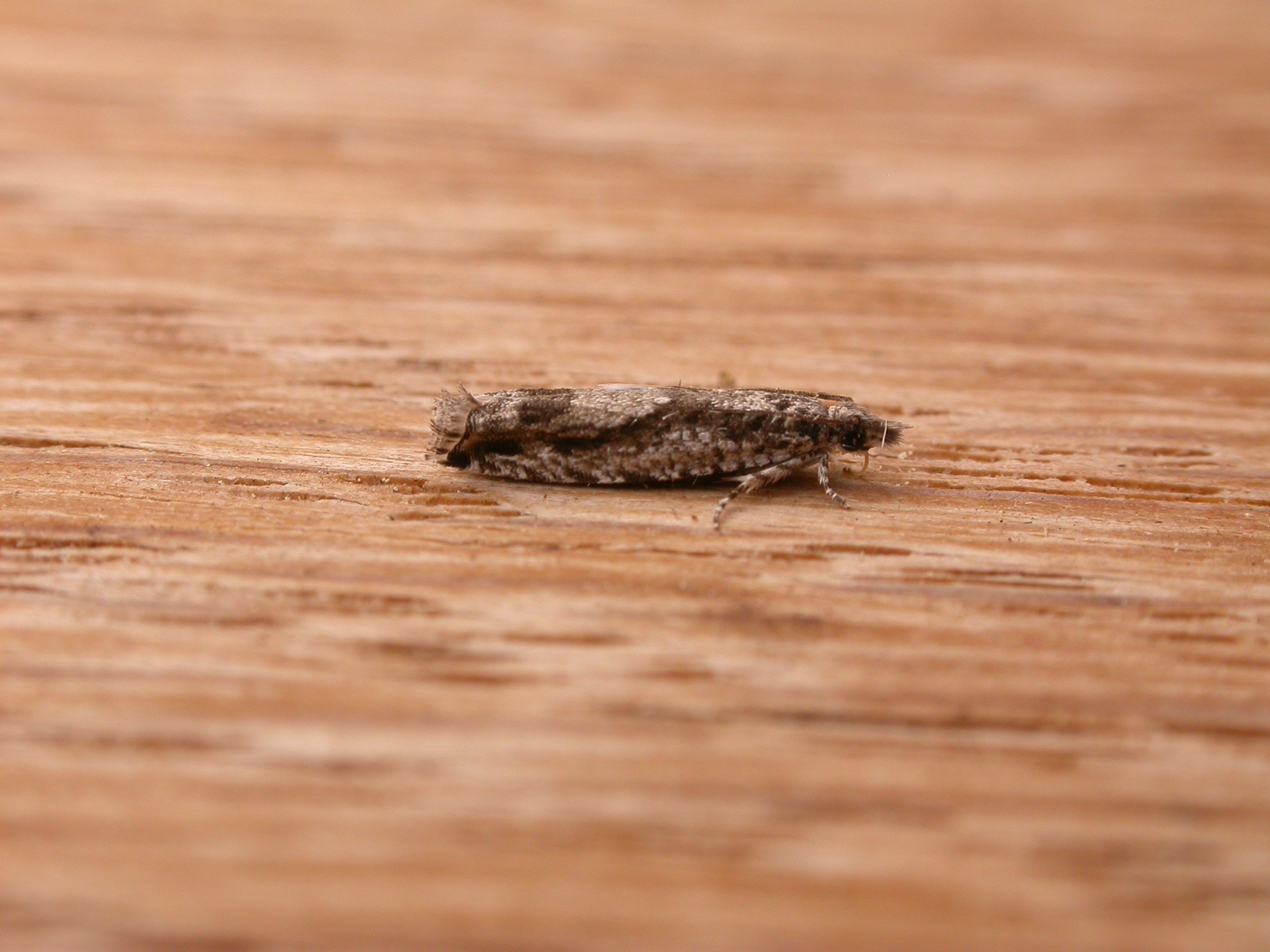
- Holocola thalassinana (Meyrick, 1881)

Scientific classification
- Domain: Eukaryota
- Kingdom: Animalia
- Phylum: Arthropoda
- Class: Insecta
- Order: Lepidoptera
- Family: Tortricidae
- Tribe: Eucosmini
- Genus: Holocola; Meyrick, 1881

= Holocola =

Genus of tortrix moths

Holocola is a genus of moths of the family Tortricidae.

== Species ==
- Holocola aethalostola (Turner, 1946)
- Holocola ammostigma (Turner, 1946)
- Holocola argyrotypa (Turner, 1927)
- Holocola atmophanes (Turner, 1946)
- Holocola baeodes (Turner, 1946)
- Holocola chalcitis (Meyrick, 1911)
- Holocola charopa (Meyrick, 1888)
- Holocola chlidana (Turner, 1927)
- Holocola deloschema (Turner, 1914)
- Holocola dolopaea ((Meyrick, 1905)
- Holocola ebenostigma (Turner, 1946)
- Holocola emplasta (Meyrick, 1901)
- Holocola fluidana (Meyrick, 1881)
- Holocola honesta (Meyrick, 1911)
- Holocola hypomolybda (Turner, 1927)
- Holocola imbrifera (Meyrick, 1911)
- Holocola ischalea (Meyrick, 1911)
- Holocola liturata (Turner, 1925)
- Holocola lucifera (Turner, 1946)
- Holocola melanographa (Turner, 1916)
- Holocola morosa (Meyrick, 1911)
- Holocola niphosticha (Turner, 1946)
- Holocola nitida (Turner, 1946)
- Holocola notosphena (Turner, 1946)
- Holocola obeliscana (Meyrick, 1881)
- Holocola ochropepla (Turner, 1926)
- Holocola opsia (Meyrick, 1911)
- Holocola parthenia (Meyrick, 1888)
- Holocola pellopis (Turner, 1946)
- Holocola peraea (Meyrick, 1911)
- Holocola pericyphana (Meyrick, 1881)
- Holocola periptycha (Turner, 1946)
- Holocola perspectana (Walker, 1863)
- Holocola phaeoscia (Turner, 1916)
- Holocola plinthinana (Meyrick, 1881)
- Holocola seditiosana (Meyrick, 1881)
- Holocola sicariana (Meyrick, 1881)
- Holocola sollicitana (Meyrick, 1881)
- Holocola spanistis (Meyrick, 1911)
- Holocola spodostola (Turner, 1946)
- Holocola striphromita (Turner, 1946)
- Holocola tarachodes (Meyrick, 1911)
- Holocola thalassinana Meyrick, 1881
- Holocola tranquilla Meyrick, 1881
- Holocola triangulana Meyrick, 1881
- Holocola vitiosa (Meyrick, 1911)
- Holocola zopherana (Meyrick, 1881)

== See also ==
- List of Tortricidae genera
