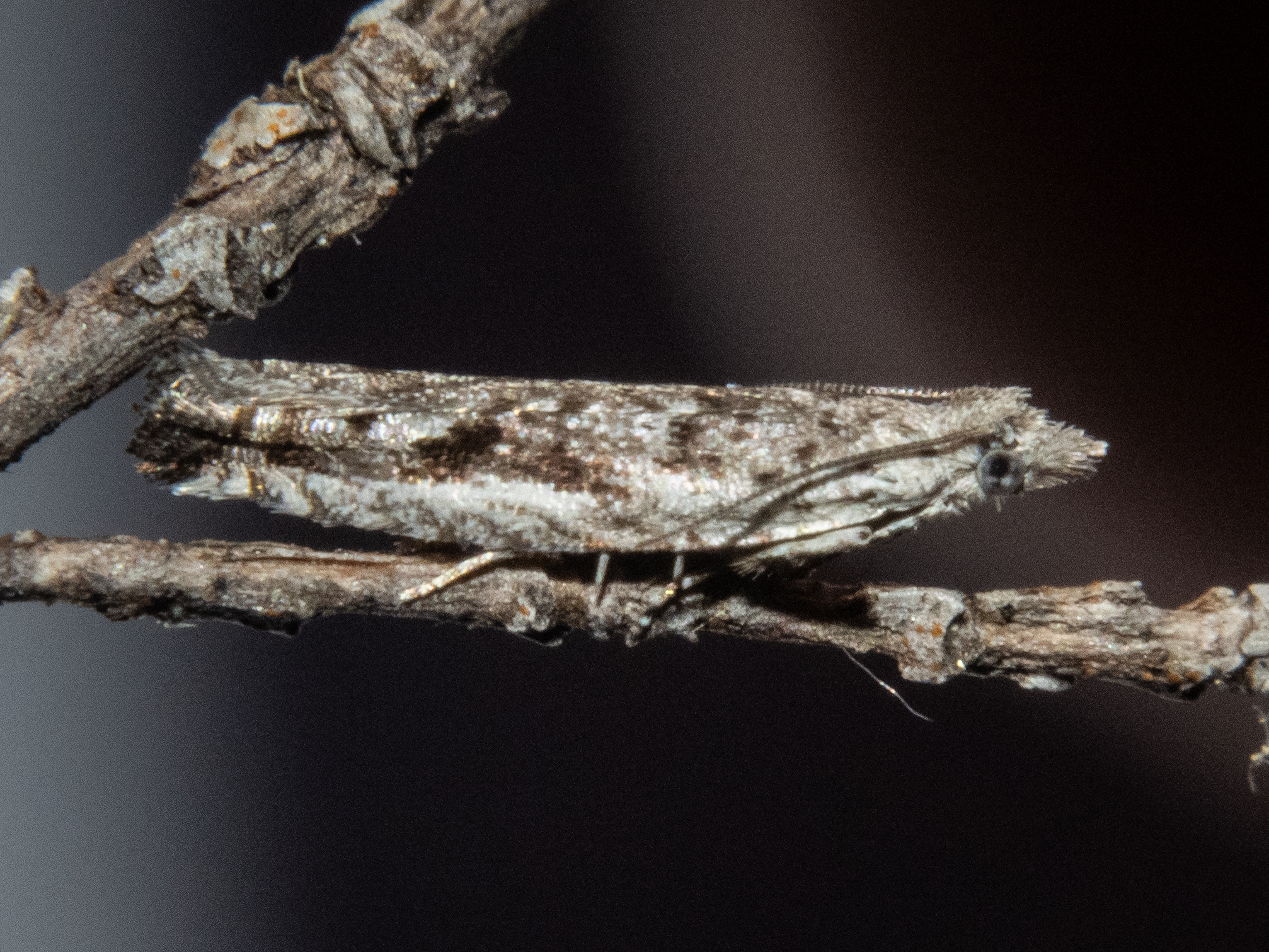

Scientific classification
- Kingdom: Animalia
- Phylum: Arthropoda
- Clade: Pancrustacea
- Class: Insecta
- Order: Lepidoptera
- Family: Tortricidae
- Genus: Holocola
- Species: H. zopherana

Binomial name
- Holocola zopherana (Meyrick, 1881)

Synonyms
- Strepsiceros zopherana Meyrick, 1881; Spilonota zopherana (Meyrick, 1881); Spilonota clastomochla Turner, 1946; Spilonota euthytoma Turner, 1946; Spilonota poliophylla Turner, 1946; Spilonota stenophylla Turner, 1946

= Holocola zopherana =

Species of moth

Holocola zopherana is a species of moth in the family Tortricidae first described by Edward Meyrick in 1881. This species is found in Australia and New Zealand. The larval hosts of this moth are Kunzea ericoides as well as species within the plant genus Leptospermum. The larvae of this moth can be found early in December. They pupate in a pupa enclosed in a thin silken cocoon and pass the winter in that state.

== Taxonomy ==
This species was first described by Edward Meyrick in 1881 using four specimens collected in Sydney in December and named Strepsiceros zopherana. George Hudson discussed this species both in his 1928 book The butterflies and moths of New Zealand as well as in the 1939 book A supplement to the butterflies and moths of New Zealand, under the name Spilonota zopherana. In 2010 the Inventory of New Zealand Biodiversity listed this species under the name Holocola zopherana. The male lectotype specimen, collected by I. F. B. Common in Sydney, is held at the Natural History Museum, London.

== Description ==
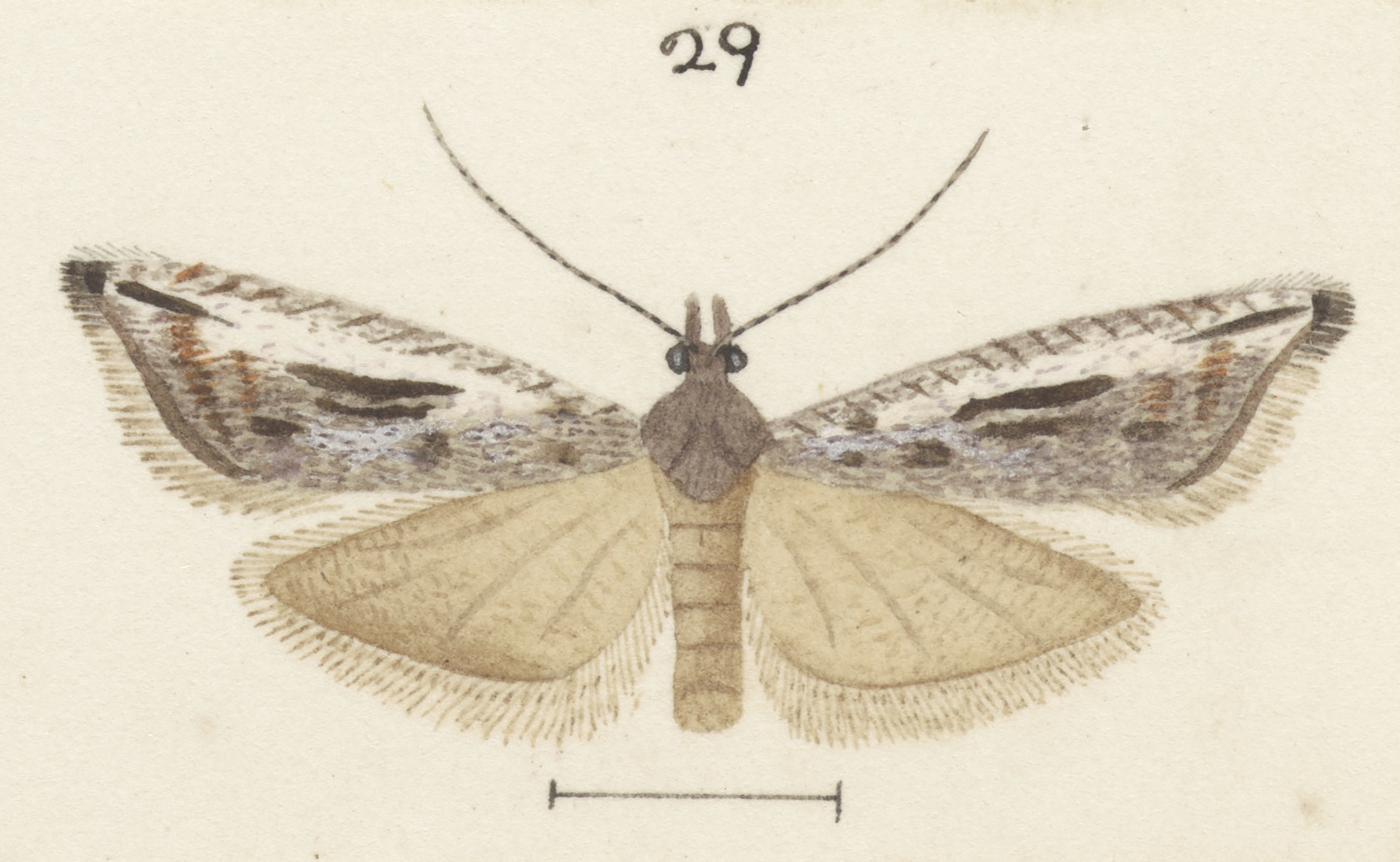
Illustration of male H. zopherana by Hudson.

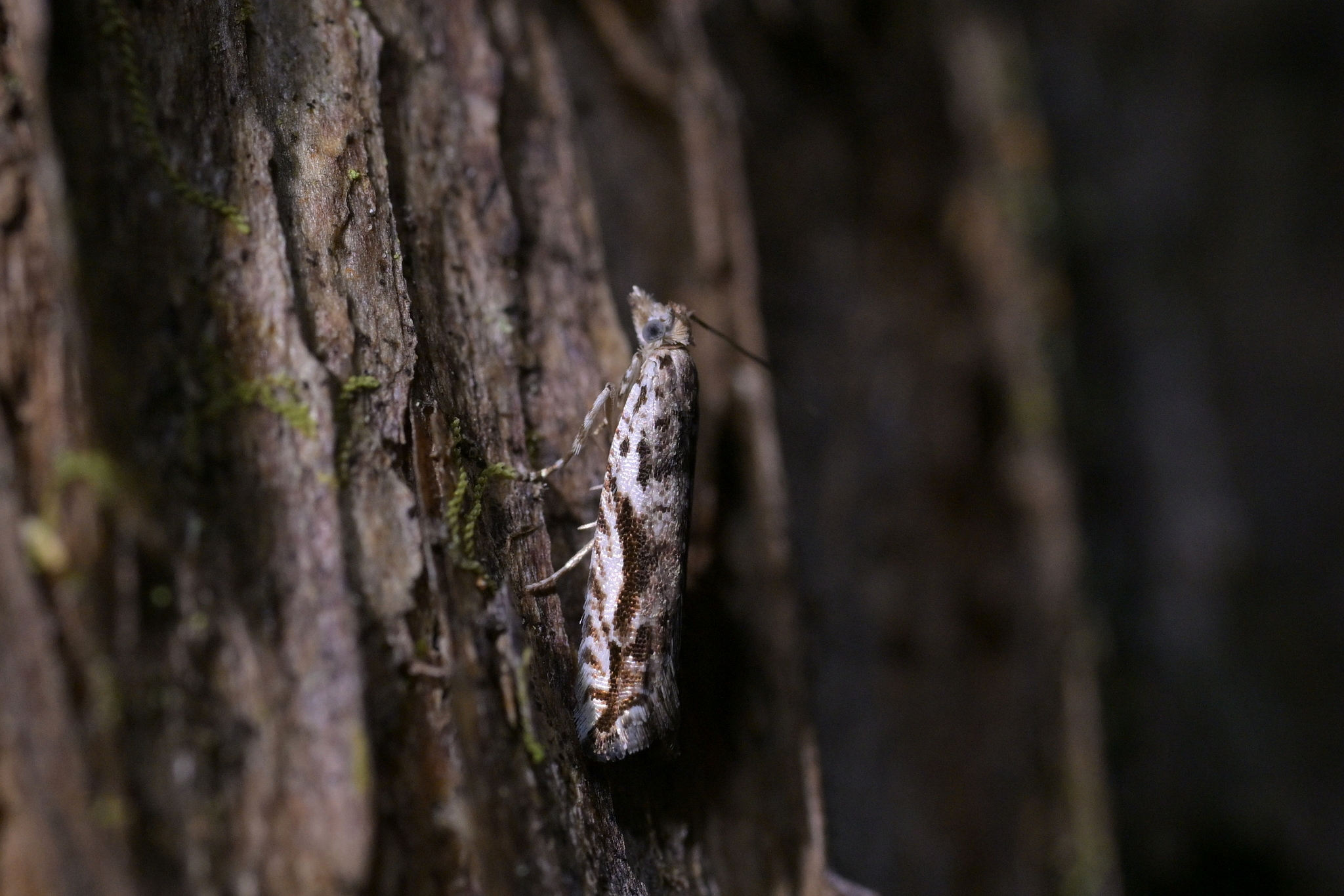
Holocola zopherana at rest.

Hudson described the larva and pupa of this species as follows:

The larva, which feeds on Manuka (Leptospermum) is slightly over 1/4 inch (8 mm.) in length. Cylindrical, stout, rapidly tapering towards posterior extremity; head and plate of segment 2 bright shining ochreous; rest of body ochreous with three rows of rather irregular crimson spots on dorsal area. Found early in December. Pupa enclosed in a rather thin silken cocoon. This insect passes the winter in the pupa state.

Meyrick originally described the adults of this species as follows:

♂ ♀ . 5"-6". Head, palpi, and thorax grey, more or less irrorated with white, head sometimes almost wholly white; palpi not tufted. Antennae dark fuscous, in male somewhat thickened and notched at about one-eighth from basal joint. Abdomen dark grey, segmental margins silvery-whitish. Legs whitish, anterior and middle tibiae and all tarsi sharply banded with dark fuscous. Forewings very narrow, costa slightly arched, apex produced, hindmargin sinuate, very oblique; dark grey, irrorated with whitish; costa very obliquely strigulated with blackish-grey; a rather broad ill-defined white streak beneath costa from base to apex, crossed by an oblique dark grey fascia-like streak before middle, and three or four slender dark grey very oblique strigulae between that and apex; middle of disc somewhat suffused with, blackish; an ill-defined black spot in disc above anal angle; generally a row of about three ill-defined black spots above anal angle towards hindmargin, preceded and followed by an obscure silvery-metallic line : cilia dark grey, paler towards anal angle, with a blackish apical spot, costal cilia white. Hindwings thinly scaled, grey, darker at extremity; cilia pale grey, with an indistinct darker line near base; veins 3 and 4 coincident.

This species can be distinguished from similar looking species by the white subcostal streak from base to apex, however the colouration of adult moths is variable. Hudson stated that this species is variable both in the depth of the greyish-brown colouring as well as the width of the white streak and the extent and intensity of other markings.

== Distribution ==
This species is found both in Australia and New Zealand. In New Zealand the species is found throughout the country where ever one of its host species, mānuka, can be found.

== Behaviour ==
Hudson stated that adults of this species were most commonly observed on the wing from August to October and again from January to March indicating the possibility of two broods per year. Adults of this species have been observed on the wing in all months of the year.

== Host species ==
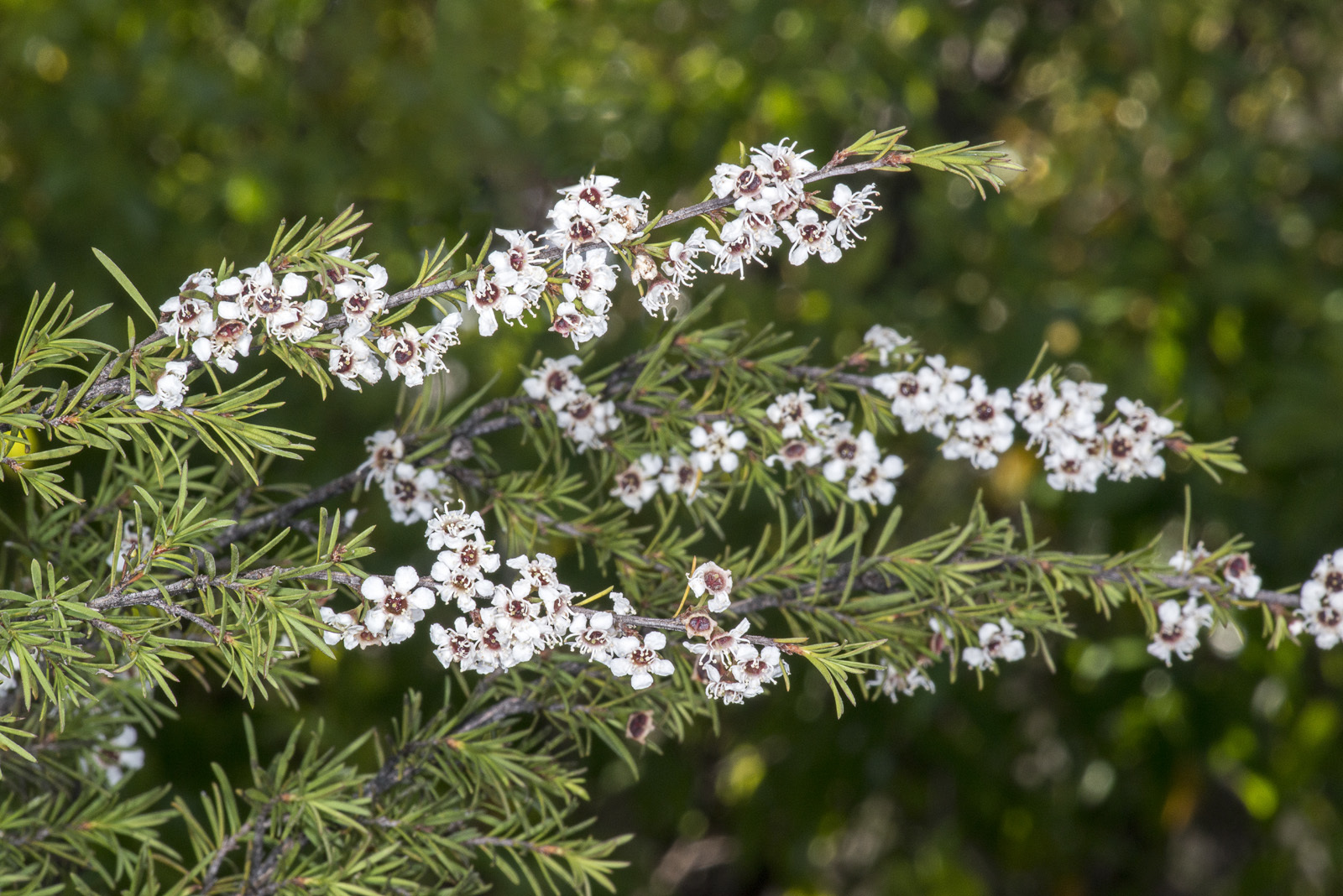
Larval host Kunzea ericoides.

The larval hosts of this moth are Kunzea ericoides as well as species within the plant genus Leptospermum. Adults have also been found in the vicinity of Leptospermum species.
