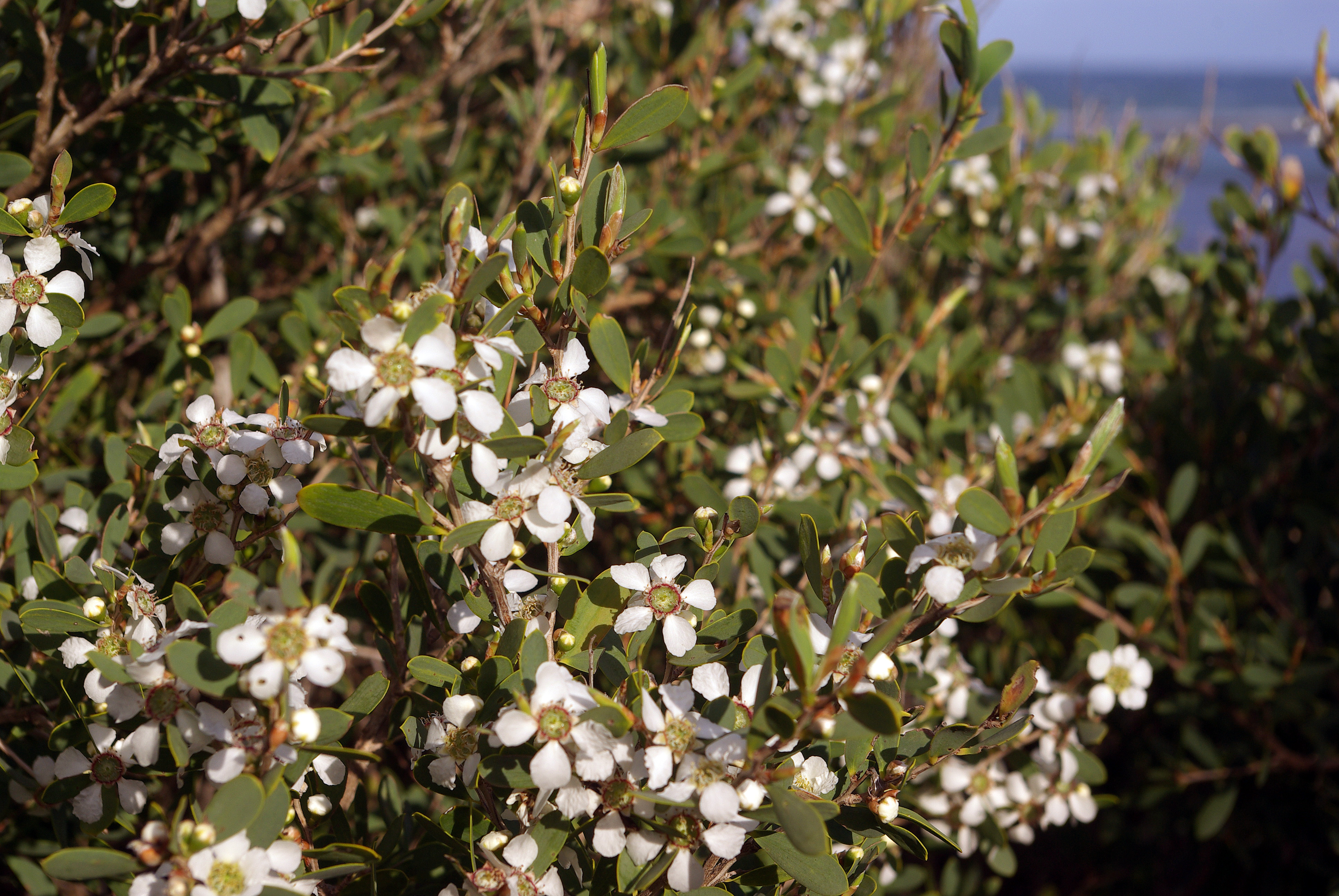

Conservation status
- Least Concern (IUCN 3.1)

Scientific classification
- Kingdom: Plantae
- Clade: Embryophytes
- Clade: Tracheophytes
- Clade: Spermatophytes
- Clade: Angiosperms
- Clade: Eudicots
- Clade: Rosids
- Order: Myrtales
- Family: Myrtaceae
- Genus: Gaudium
- Species: G. laevigatum

Binomial name
- Gaudium laevigatum (Gaertn.) Peter G.Wilson
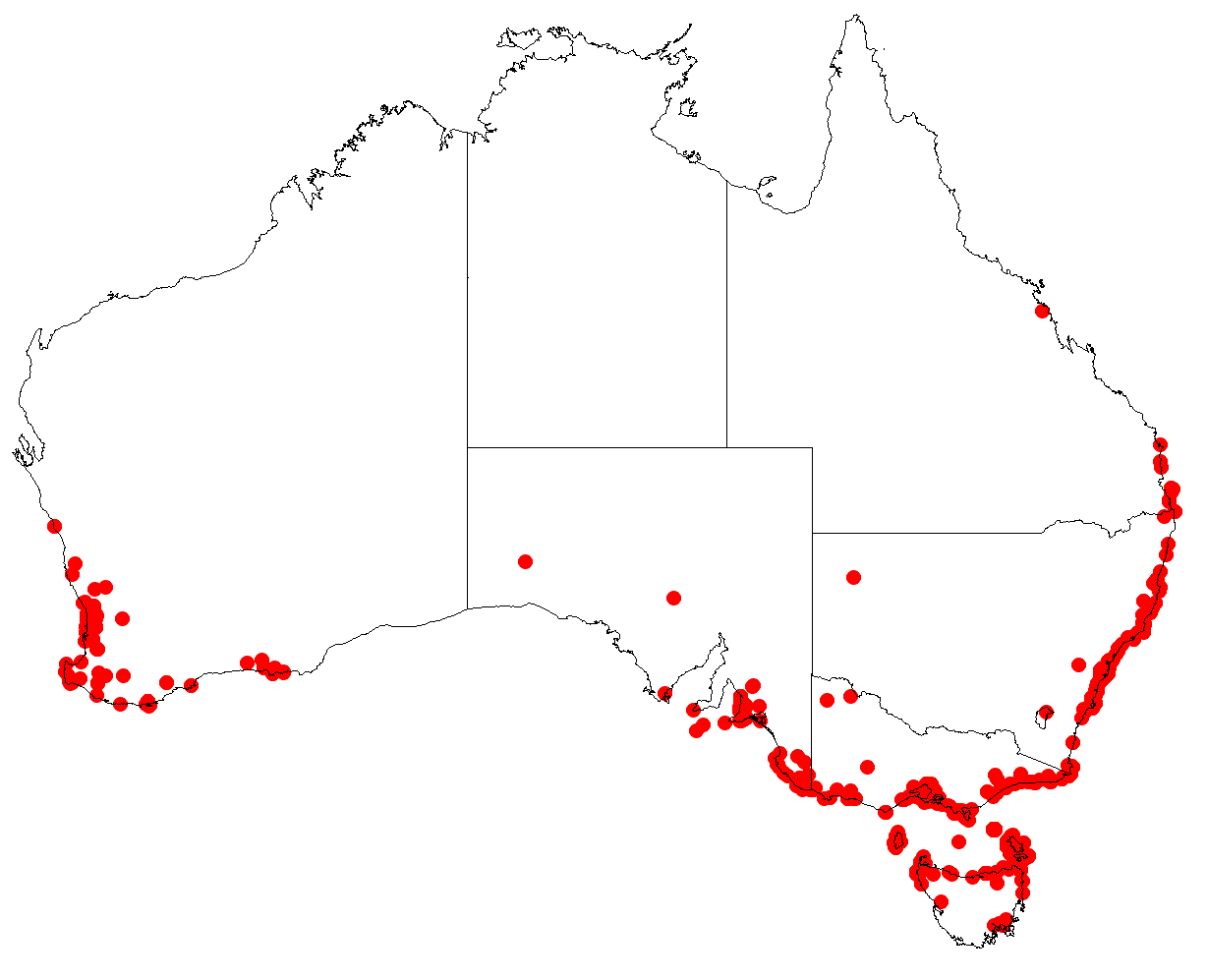
- Occurrence data from AVH, including introductions in other states

Synonyms
- Fabricia laevigata Gaertn.; Leptospermum laevigatum (Gaertn.) F.Muell.; Fabricia myrtifolia Sieber ex Benth.

= Gaudium laevigatum =

Coast teatree

Species of flowering plant

Gaudium laevigatum, commonly known as the coast tea tree, is a species of shrub or small tree that is endemic to south-eastern Australia, but has been widely introduced in other places where it is often considered to be a weed. It has thin, rough bark on the older stems, narrow egg-shaped leaves, relatively large white flowers and flat topped fruit that is shed shortly after reaching maturity.

== Description ==
Gaudium laevigatum is a bushy shrub or tree that typically grows to a height of 1.5–6 m (4 ft 11 in – 19 ft 8 in) and has thin, rough bark on the older stems. The young stems are covered with silky hairs at first and have a groove near the base of the petiole. The leaves are greyish green, narrow egg-shaped with the narrower end towards the base, 15–30 mm (0.59–1.18 in) long and 5–10 mm (0.20–0.39 in) wide on a short petiole. The flowers are borne on short side shoots, usually in pairs of different ages, and are usually 15–20 mm (0.59–0.79 in) wide. There are many reddish brown bracts around the flower buds but most fall off as the flower opens. The floral cup is mostly glabrous, 3–4 mm (0.12–0.16 in) long with the upper part expanded. The sepals are triangular, about 2 mm (0.079 in) long, the petals white, 5–8 mm (0.20–0.31 in) long and the stamens 1.5–2.5 mm (0.059–0.098 in) long. Flowering mainly occurs from August to October and the fruit is a capsule 7–8 mm (0.28–0.31 in) wide with the remains of the sepals initially attached. The fruit mostly fall from the plant shortly after reaching maturity.

== Taxonomy and naming ==
This species was first formally described in 1788 by Joseph Gaertner who gave it the name Fabricia laevigata and published the description in his book De Fructibus et Seminibus Plantarum. In 1858, Ferdinand von Mueller assigned it to the Leptospermum genus as L. laevigatum in the Parliamentary Papers- Votes and Proceedings of the Legislative Assembly.

In 2023, Peter Gordon Wilson transferred Gaertner's Fabricia laevigata to Gaudium as G. laevigatum in the journal Taxon. The specific epithet (laevigatum) is from a Latin word meaning "made smooth" or "having a polished surface".

== Distribution and habitat ==
Gaudium laevigatum is native to New South Wales, Victoria and Tasmania where it grows in heath, sometimes forest and on coastal dunes and cliffs south from Nambucca Heads in New South Wales to Anglesea in Victoria and northern Tasmania. It has also been introduced to Queensland, South Australia, Western Australia and countries overseas including southern Africa, New Zealand, Hawaii and the Central Coast of California.

== Ecology ==
Coast teatree is salt-resistant, very hardy and is commonly used in amenities plantings and coastal plantings. It has also been planted in Western Australia where it has become a weed.

This species has been planted along the Central Coast of California in the United States and on the Cape Flats in Cape Town, South Africa, to stabilize sand. It is known in the United States as the Australian tea tree and in South Africa as the Australian myrtle. The seeds can be dispersed by wind and water.

It has now become naturalised in New Zealand, southern Africa, California and Hawaii.

The larvae of Holocola thalassinana feed on Leptospermum laevigatum.

== Use in horticulture ==
This species is planted widely (as Leptospermum laevigatum) as a garden ornamental or display tree. It is useful as a windbreak or hedging plant and for the rapid stabilisation of sandy soils, and in rehabilitation areas where construction or mining has taken place. It has begun to be cultivated for essential oil production, marketed as Coastal tree tree oil, and has shown some beneficial anti-microbial properties.

== Conservation status ==
Gaudium laevigatum is not listed on the advisory list of rare or threatened plants in Victoria (2014).

== Gallery ==
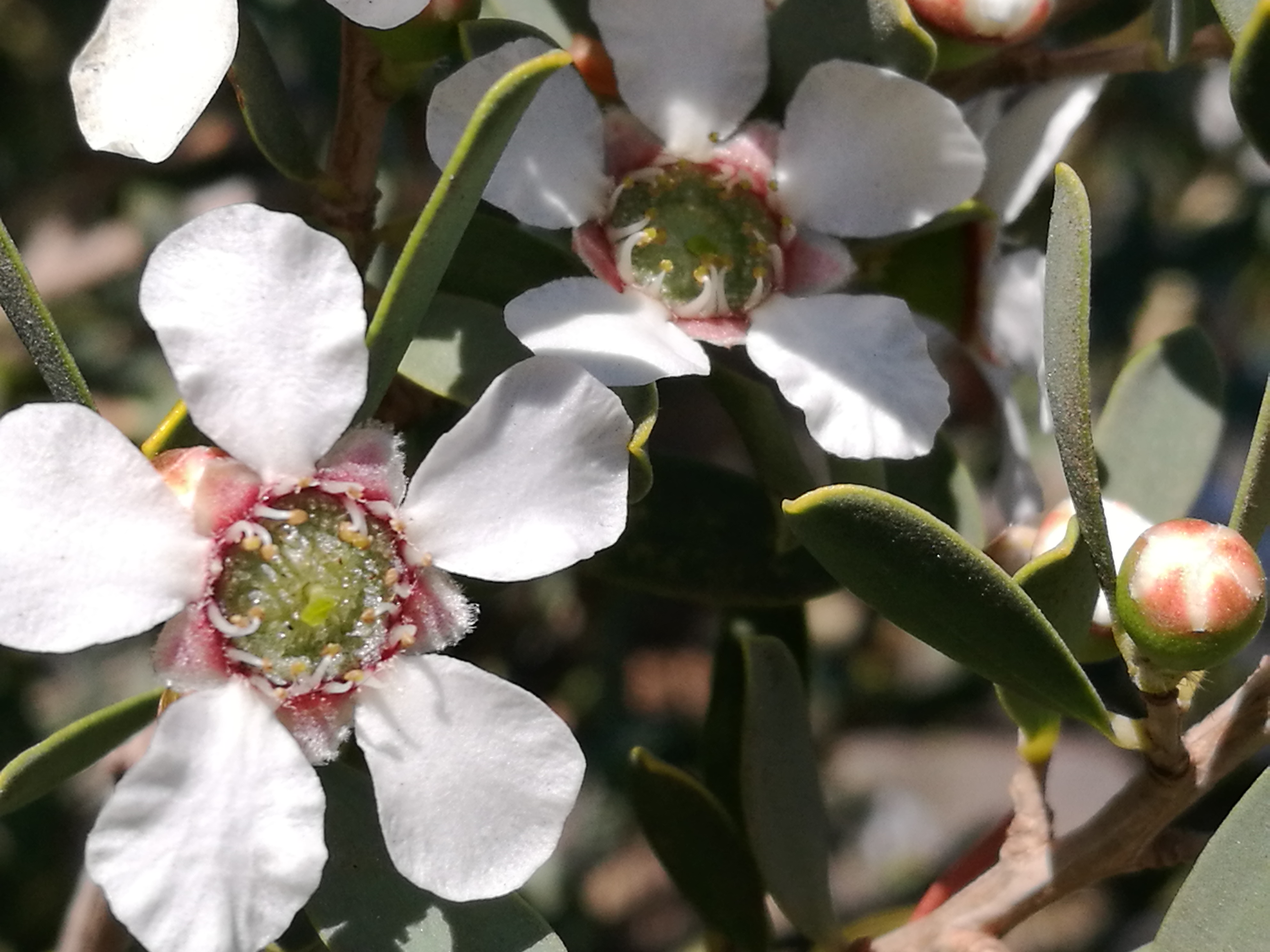
Flower

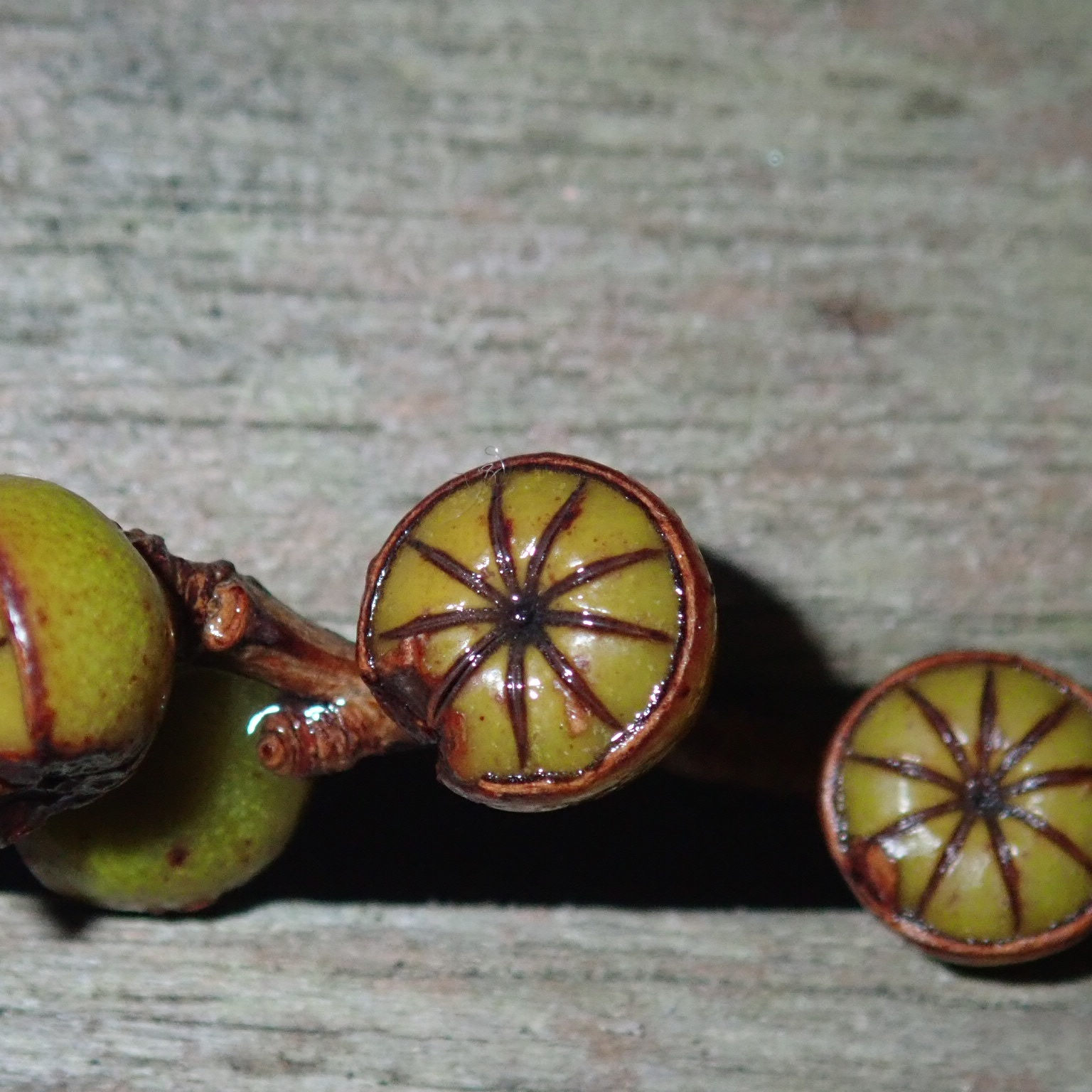
Fresh fruits

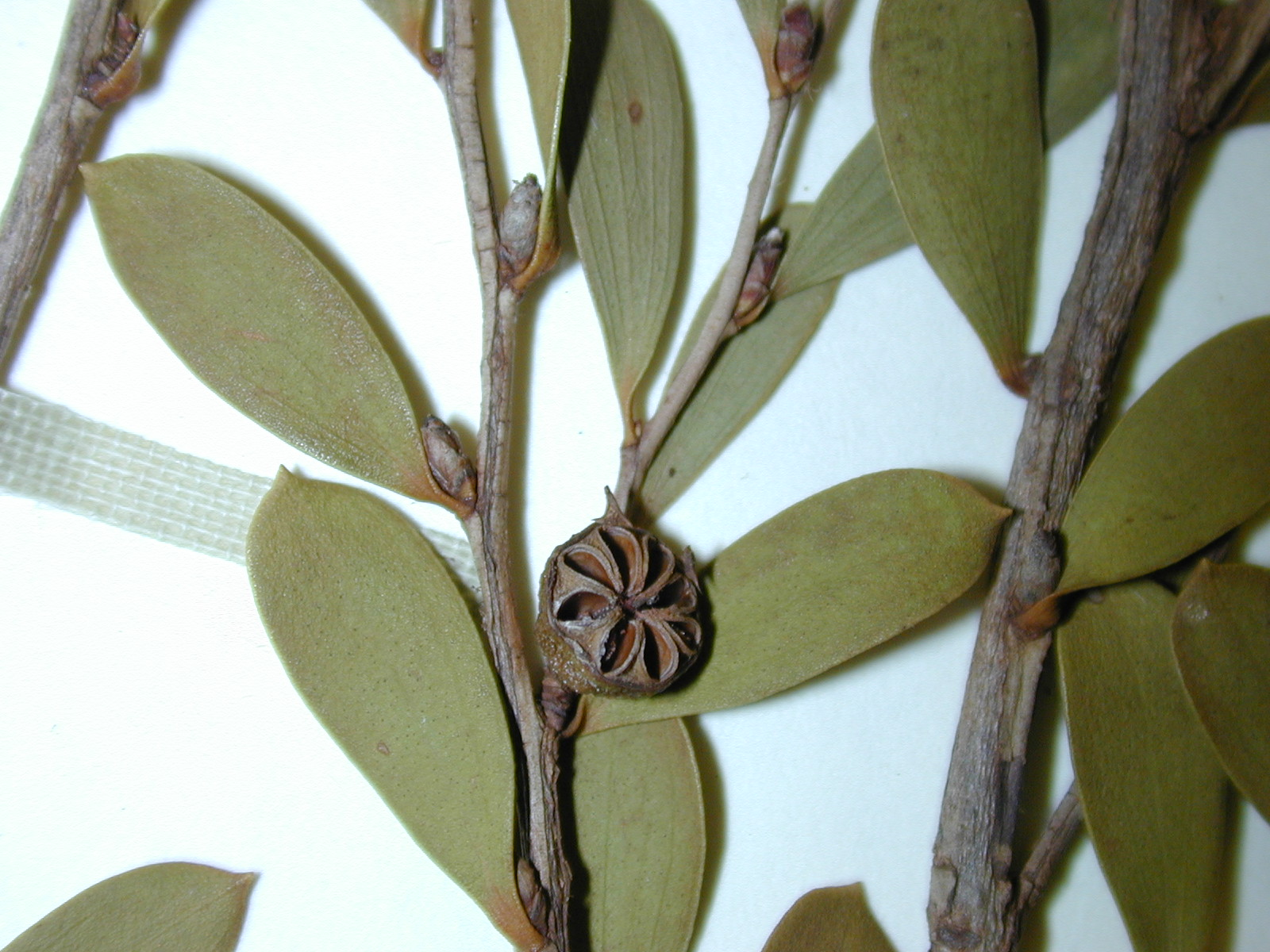
Mature seed capsule
