= Melon =

Type of fruit

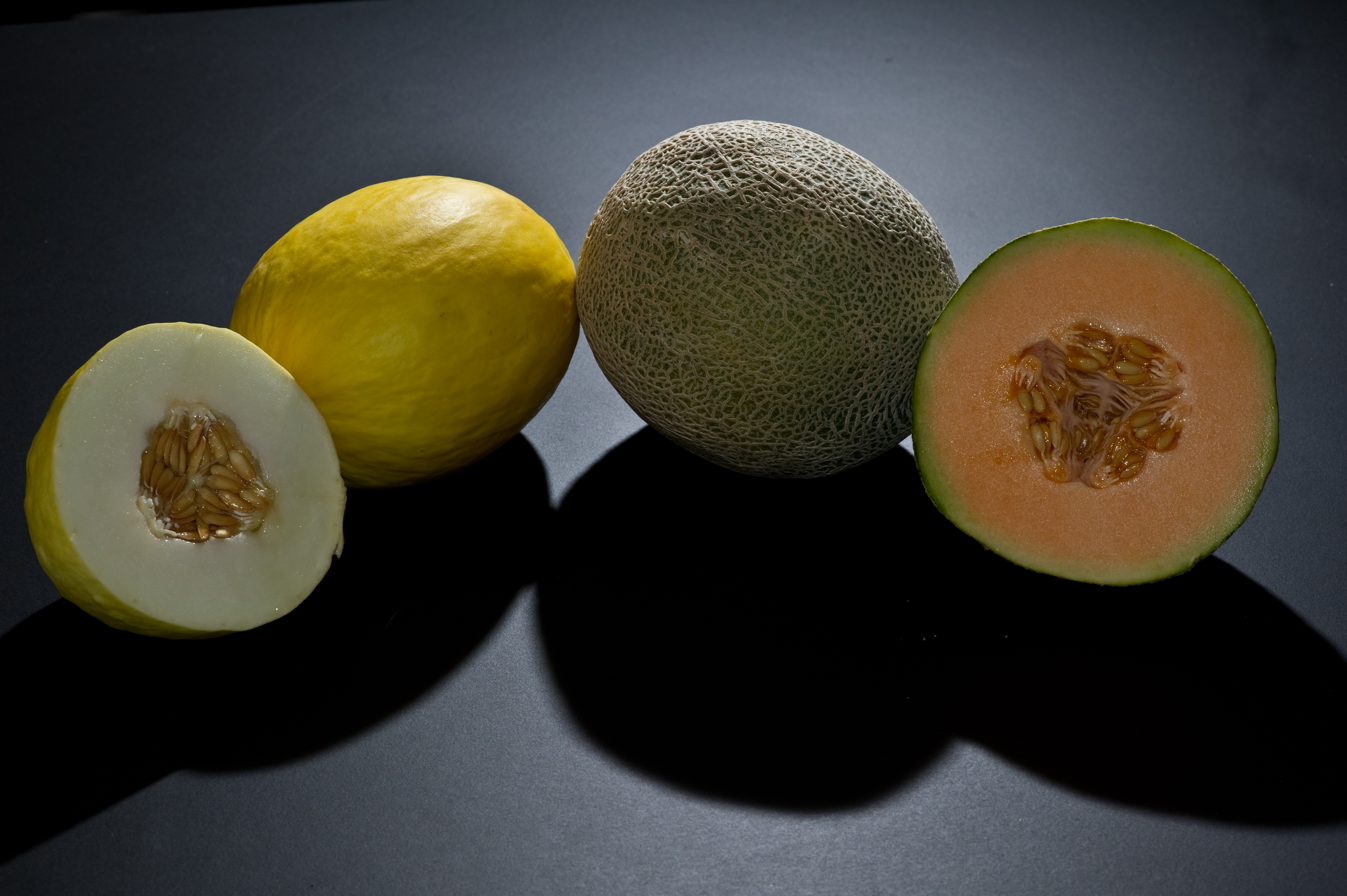
Canary melon and cantaloupe

A melon is any of various plants of the family Cucurbitaceae with sweet, edible, and fleshy fruit. It can also specifically refer to Cucumis melo, commonly known as the "true melon" or simply "melon". The term "melon" can apply to both the plant and its fruit. Botanically, a melon is a kind of berry, specifically a "pepo". The word melon derives from Latin melopepo, which is the latinization of the Greek μηλοπέπων (mēlopepōn), meaning "melon", itself a compound of μῆλον (mēlon), "apple", treefruit (of any kind)" and πέπων (pepōn), amongst others "a kind of gourd or melon". Many different cultivars have been produced, particularly of the true melon, such as the cantaloupe and honeydew.

== History ==
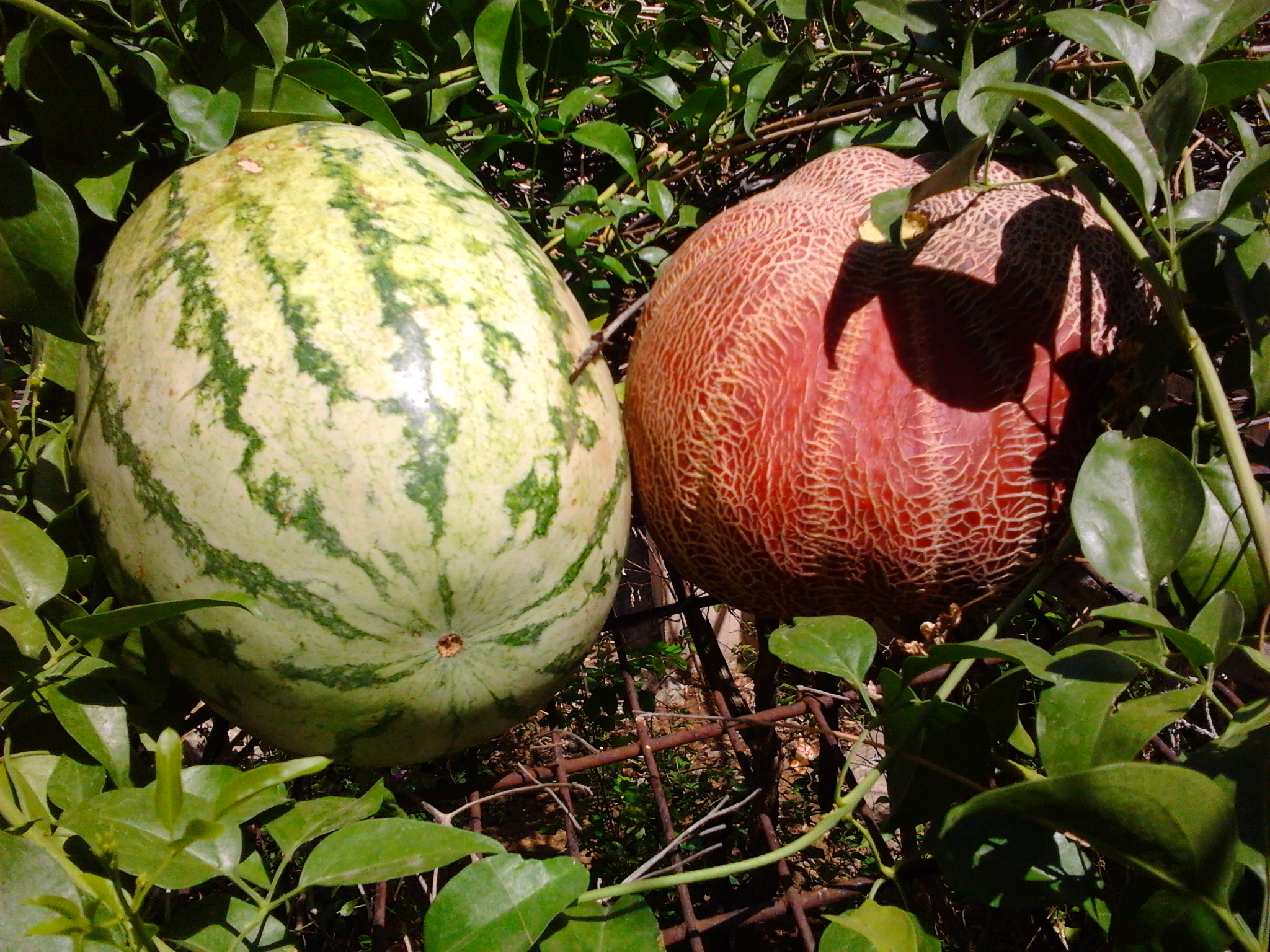
Watermelon and melon in India

Melons were thought to have originated in Africa. However, recent studies suggest a Southwest Asian origin, especially Iran and India; from there, they gradually began to appear in Europe toward the end of the Western Roman Empire. Melons are known to have been grown by the ancient Egyptians. However, recent discoveries of melon seeds dated between 1350 and 1120 BCE in Nuragic sacred wells have shown that melons were first brought to Europe by the Nuragic civilization of Sardinia during the Bronze Age. Melons were among the earliest plants to be domesticated in the Old World and among the first crop species brought by westerners to the New World. Early European settlers in the New World are recorded as growing honeydew and casaba melons as early as the 1600s. A number of Native American tribes in New Mexico, including the Acoma, Cochiti, Isleta, Navajo, Santo Domingo and San Felipe, maintain a tradition of growing their own characteristic melon cultivars, derived from melons originally introduced by the Spanish. Organizations like Native Seeds/SEARCH have made an effort to collect and preserve these and other heritage seeds.

== Melons by genus ==
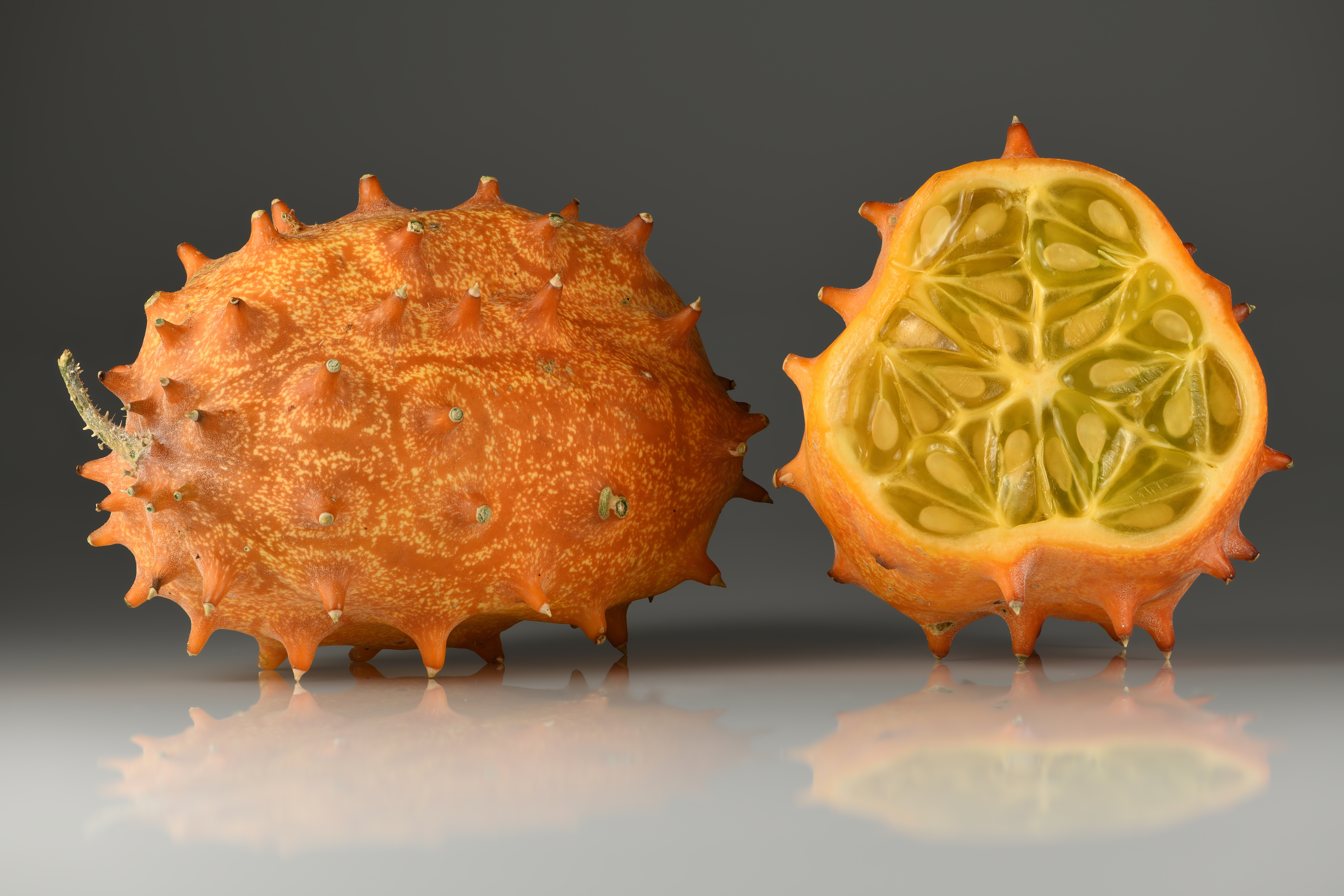
Horned melon

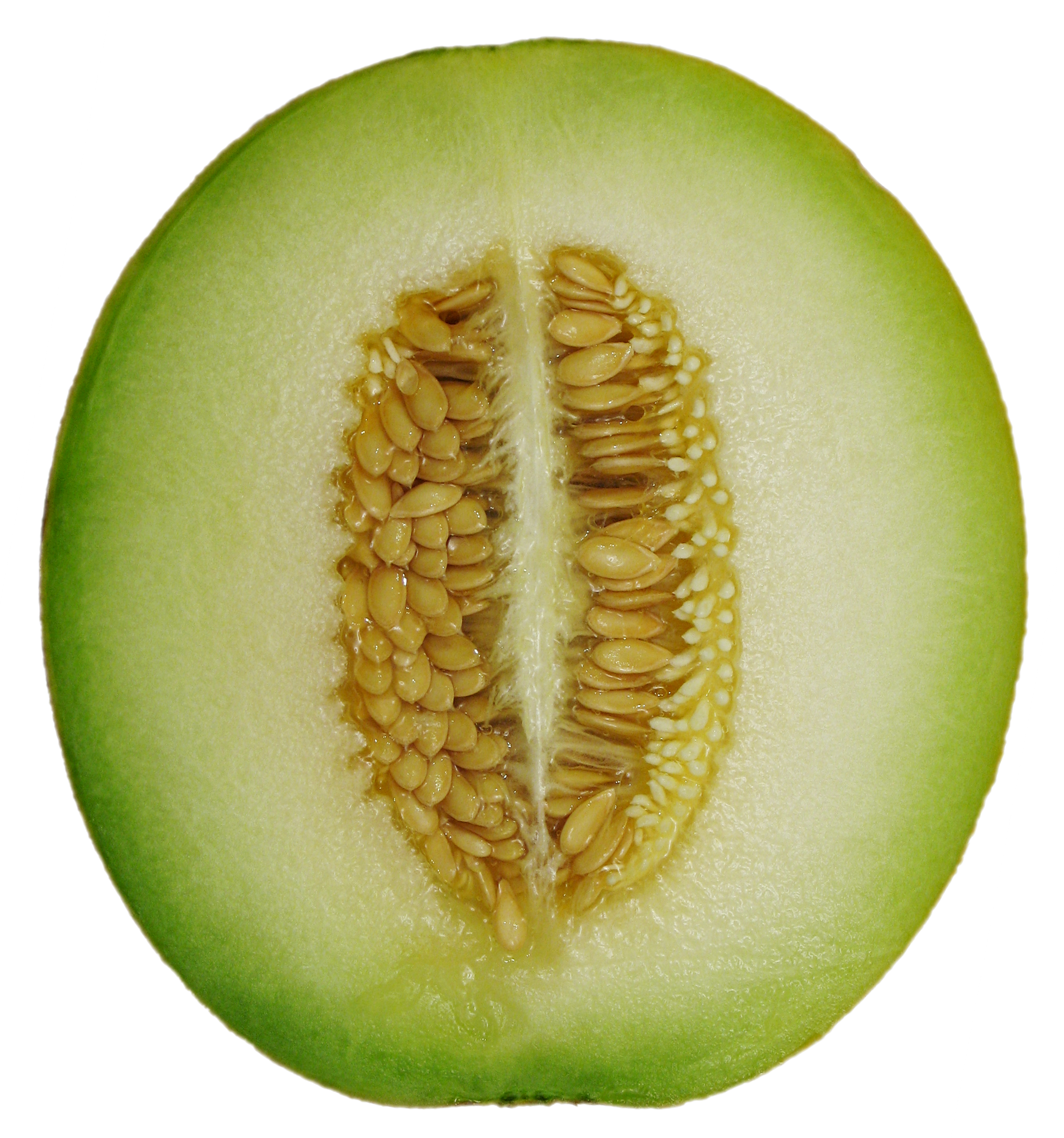
Honeydew

=== Benincasa ===
- Winter melon (Note: Not to be confused with Cucumis melo inodorus varieties, also collectively called winter melon.) (B. hispida) is the only member of the genus Benincasa. The mature winter melon is a cooking vegetable that is widely used in Asia, especially in India. The immature melons are used as a culinary fruit (e.g., to make a distinctive fruit drink).

=== Citrullus ===
- Citron melon (C. amarus) closely resembles the watermelon, but has harder, whiter flesh. It is often cooked or preserved rather than being eaten raw. It is native to sub-Saharan Africa.
- Colocynth (C. colocynthis) is a wild melon, similar in appearance to the watermelon. The flesh is inedible, but the seeds are a valuable food source in Africa. Other species that have the same culinary role, and that are also called egusi include Melothria sphaerocarpa (syn. Cucumeropsis mannii) and Lagenaria siceraria.
- Watermelon (C. lanatus) originated in Africa, where evidence indicates that it has been cultivated for over 4,000 years. It is a popular summer fruit in all parts of the world.

=== Cucumis ===
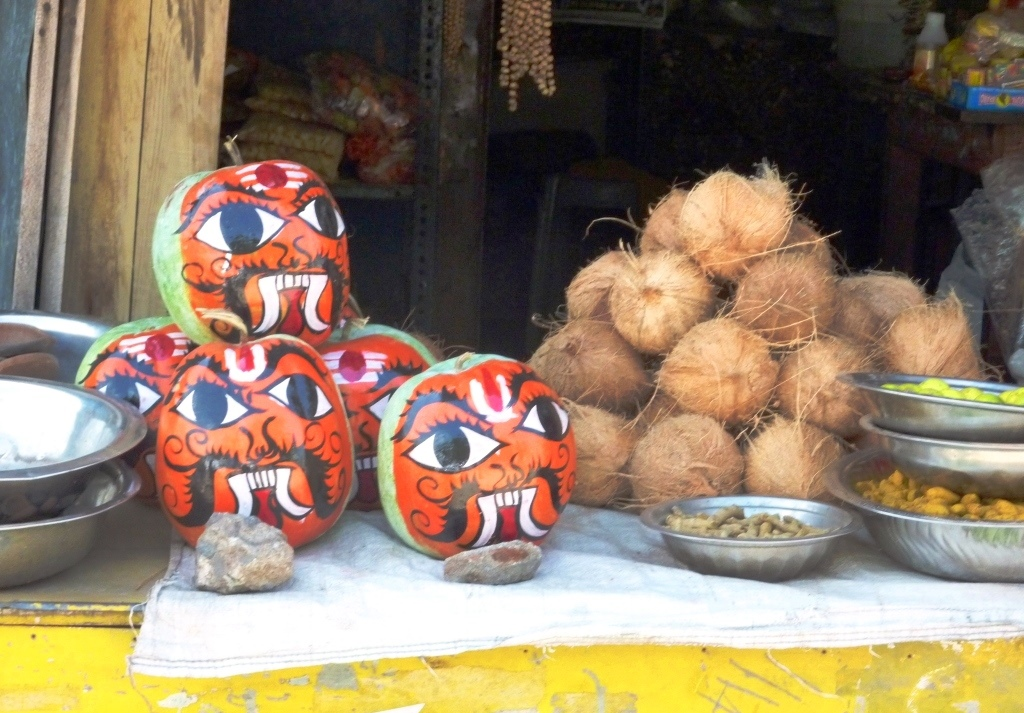
Painted green melons. Chennai, India, 2010

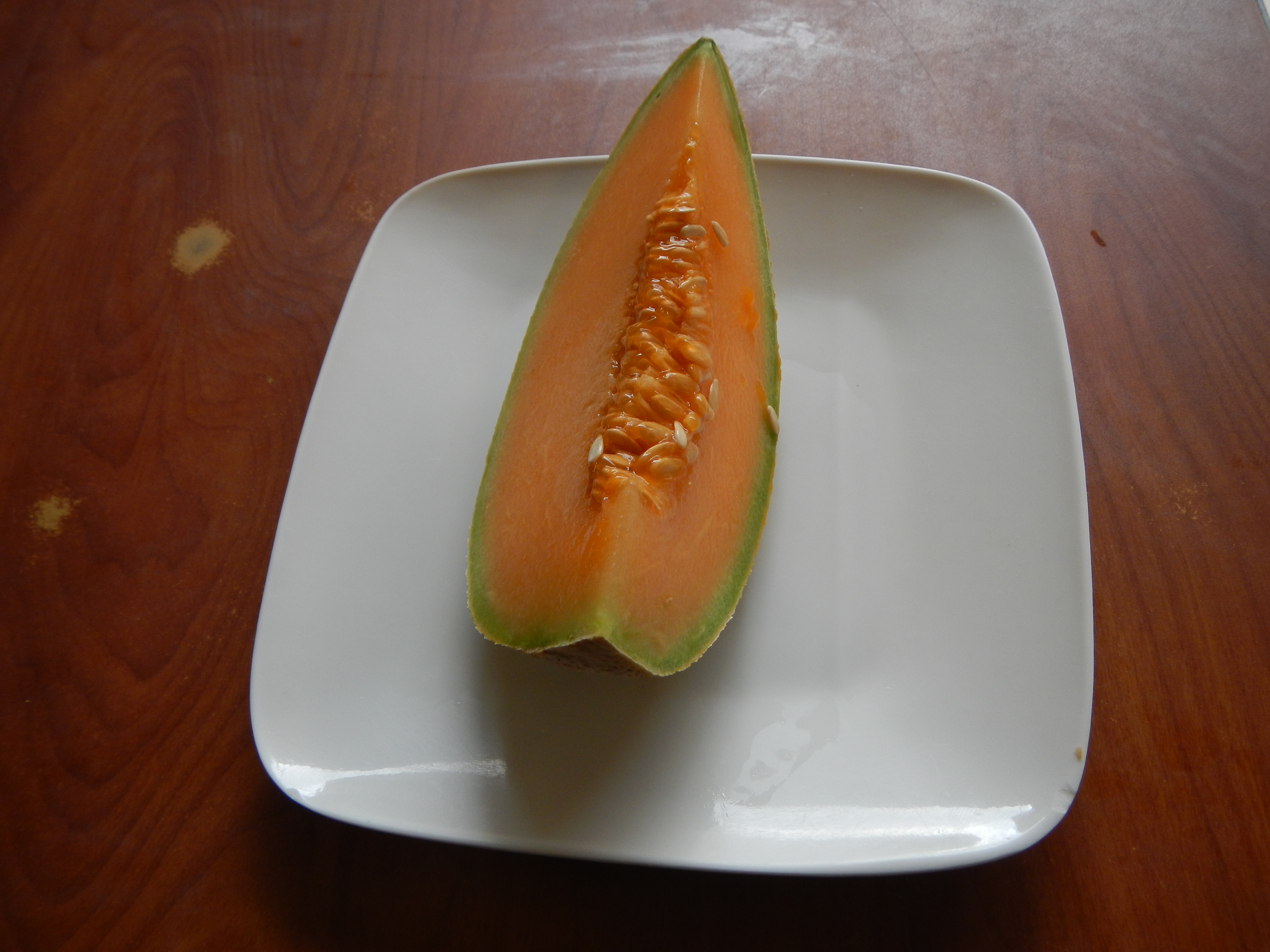
Slice of cantaloupe melon

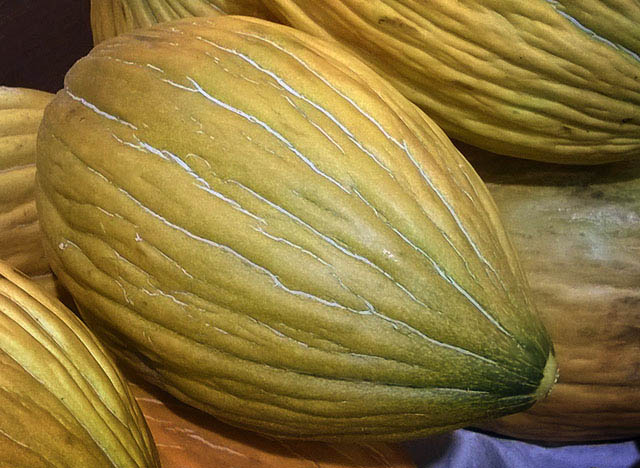
Argos melon

Melons in genus Cucumis are culinary fruits, and include the majority of culinary melons. All but a handful of culinary melon varieties belong to the species Cucumis melo L.

- Horned melon (C. metuliferus), a traditional food plant in Africa with distinctive spikes. Now grown in California, Chile, Australia and New Zealand as well.
- True melon (C. melo)
  - C. melo cantalupensis, with skin that is rough and warty, not netted.
    - The European cantaloupe, with lightly ribbed, pale green skin, was domesticated in the 18th century, in Cantalupo in Sabina, Italy, by the pope's gardener. It is also known as a 'rockmelon' in Australia and New Zealand. Varieties include the French Charentais and the Burpee Seeds hybrid Netted Gem, introduced in the 19th century. The Yubari King is a highly prized Japanese cantaloupe cultivar.
    - The Persian melon resemble a large cantaloupe with a darker green rind and a finer netting.
  - C. melo inodorus, casabas, honeydew, and Asian melons
    - Argos, a large, oblong, with orange wrinkled skin, orange flesh, strong aroma. A characteristic is its pointed ends. Growing in some areas of Greece, from which it gets its name.
    - Banana melon, an heirloom variety with salmon-colored flesh and an elongated banana shape and yellow rind
    - Canary melon, a large, bright-yellow melon with a pale green to white inner flesh.
    - Casaba, bright yellow, with a smooth, furrowed skin. Less flavorful than other melons, but keeps longer.
    - Crenshaw melon, a hybrid between a Casaba melon and a Persian melon that is described to have a very sweet flavor
    - Gaya melon, originally from Japan, a honeydew cultivar that is ivory in color and has a mild, sweet flavor
    - Hami melon, originally from Hami, Xinjiang, China. Flesh is sweet and crisp.
    - Honeydew, with a sweet, juicy, green-colored flesh. Grown as bailan melon in Lanzhou, China. There is a second variety which has yellow skin, white flesh and tastes like a moist pear.
    - Honeymoon melon, a variety of honeydew with golden rind and bright green flesh and a sweet flavor
    - Kajari melon, a sweet honeydew cultivar that is red-orange in color with green stripes reminiscent of a beach ball
    - Kolkhoznitsa melon, with smooth, yellow skin and dense, white flesh.
    - Japanese melons (including the Sprite melon).
    - Korean melon, a yellow melon with white lines running across the fruit and white inside. Can be crisp and slightly sweet or juicy when left to ripen longer.
    - Mirza melon, a large, cream-colored melon native to Central Asia with a sweet, savory flavor
    - Oriental pickling melon
    - Pixie melon, a sweet, palm-sized cantaloupe cultivar with a strange, cracked-looking netting
    - Piel de Sapo ('toad skin') or Santa Claus melon, a melon with a blotchy green skin and white sweet-tasting flesh.
    - Sugar melon, a smooth, white, round fruit.
    - Tiger melon, an orange, yellow and black striped melon from Turkey with a soft pulp.
  - C. melo reticulatus, true muskmelons, with netted (reticulated) skin.
    - North American cantaloupe, distinct from the European cantaloupe, with the net-like skin pattern common to other C. melo reticulatus varieties.
    - Galia (or Ogen), small and very juicy with either faint green or rosy pink flesh.
    - Sharlyn melons, with taste between honeydew and cantaloupes, netted skin, greenish-orange rind, and white flesh.
  - C. melo agrestis, Wilder melon cultivars, with smooth skin, and tart or bland taste. Often confused with cucumbers (Dosakai, Lemon Cucumber, Pie Melons).
  - C. melo conomon, Conomon Melons, Pickling Melons, with smooth skin, and ranging from tart or bland taste (pickling melon) to mild sweetness in Korean Melon.Oriental Pickling melon, Korean Melon. Closely related to wilder melons (C Melo Var Agrestis).
  - Modern crossbred varieties, e.g. Crenshaw (Casaba × Persian), Crane (Japanese × N.A. cantaloupe).

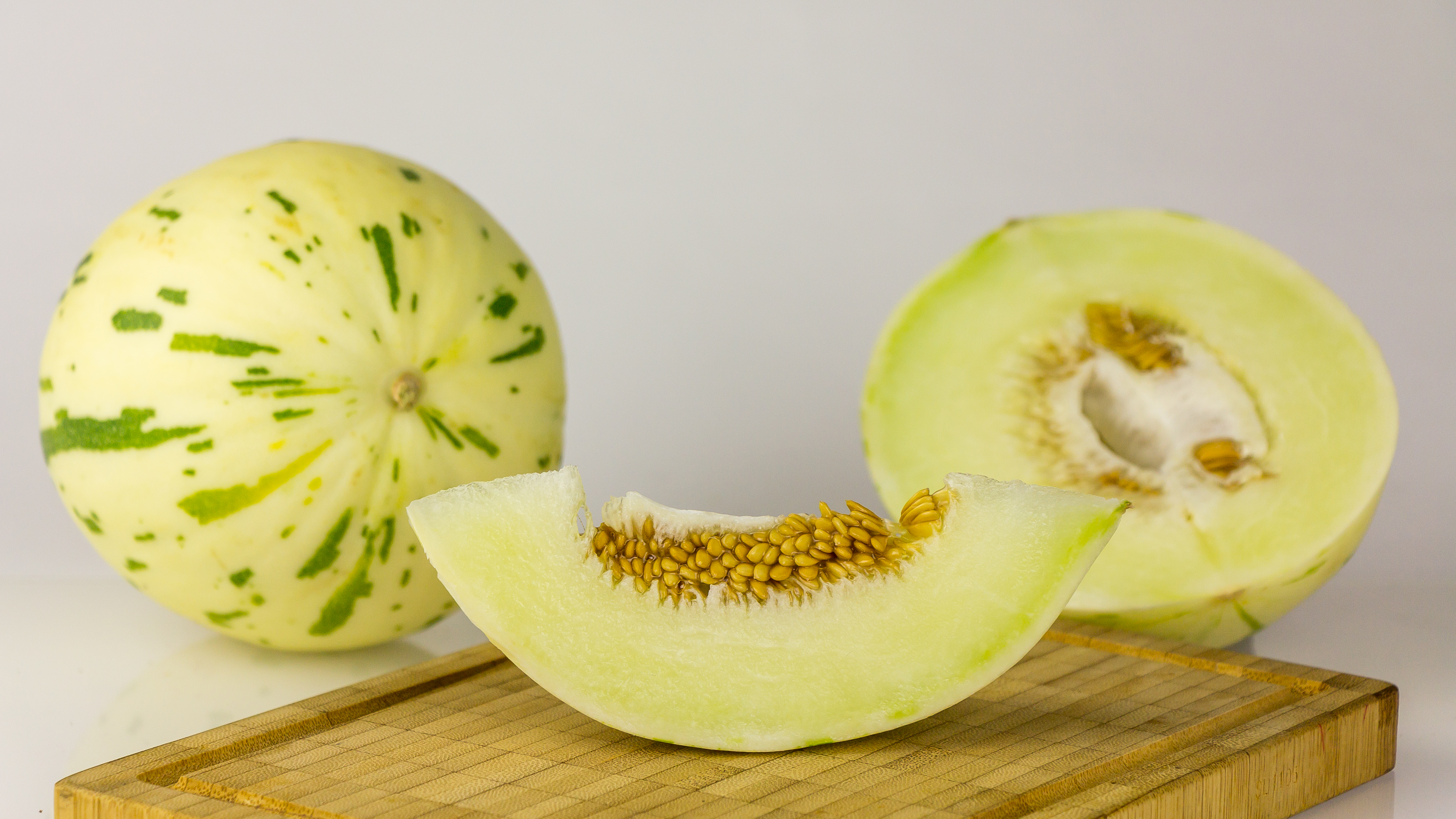
Melon Sugar Baby Matisse

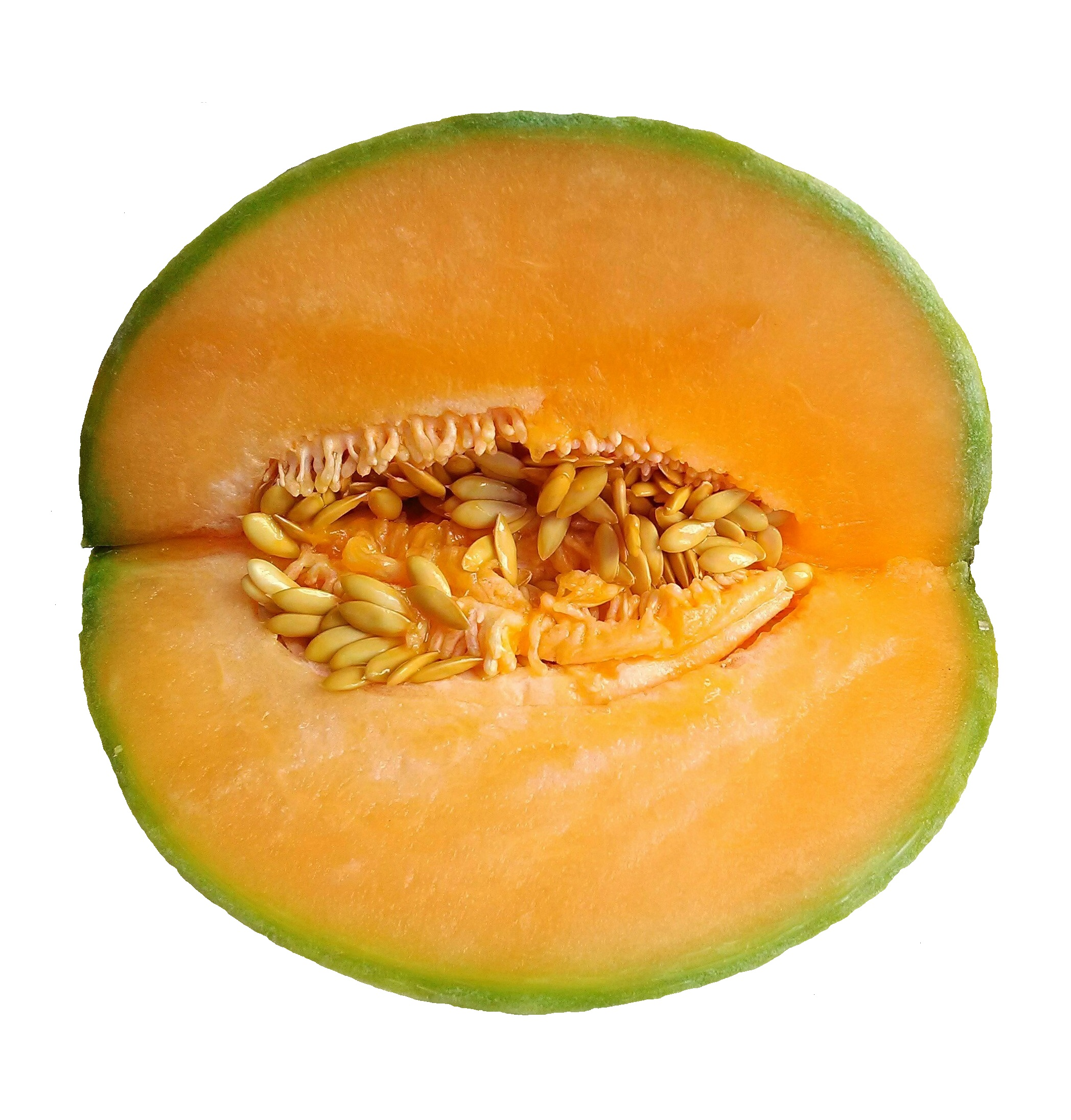
Cucumis melo

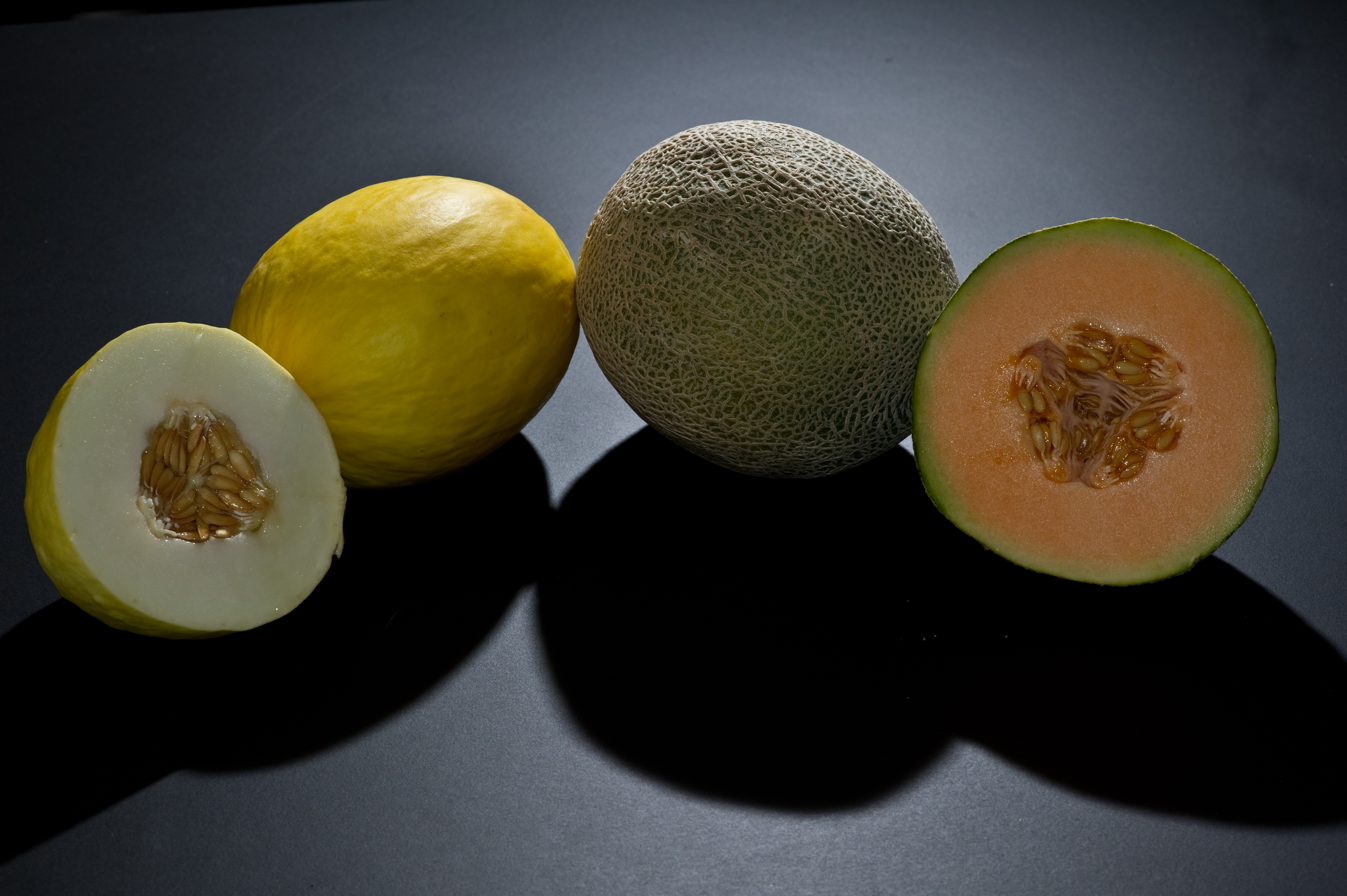
Canary melon and Cantaloupe

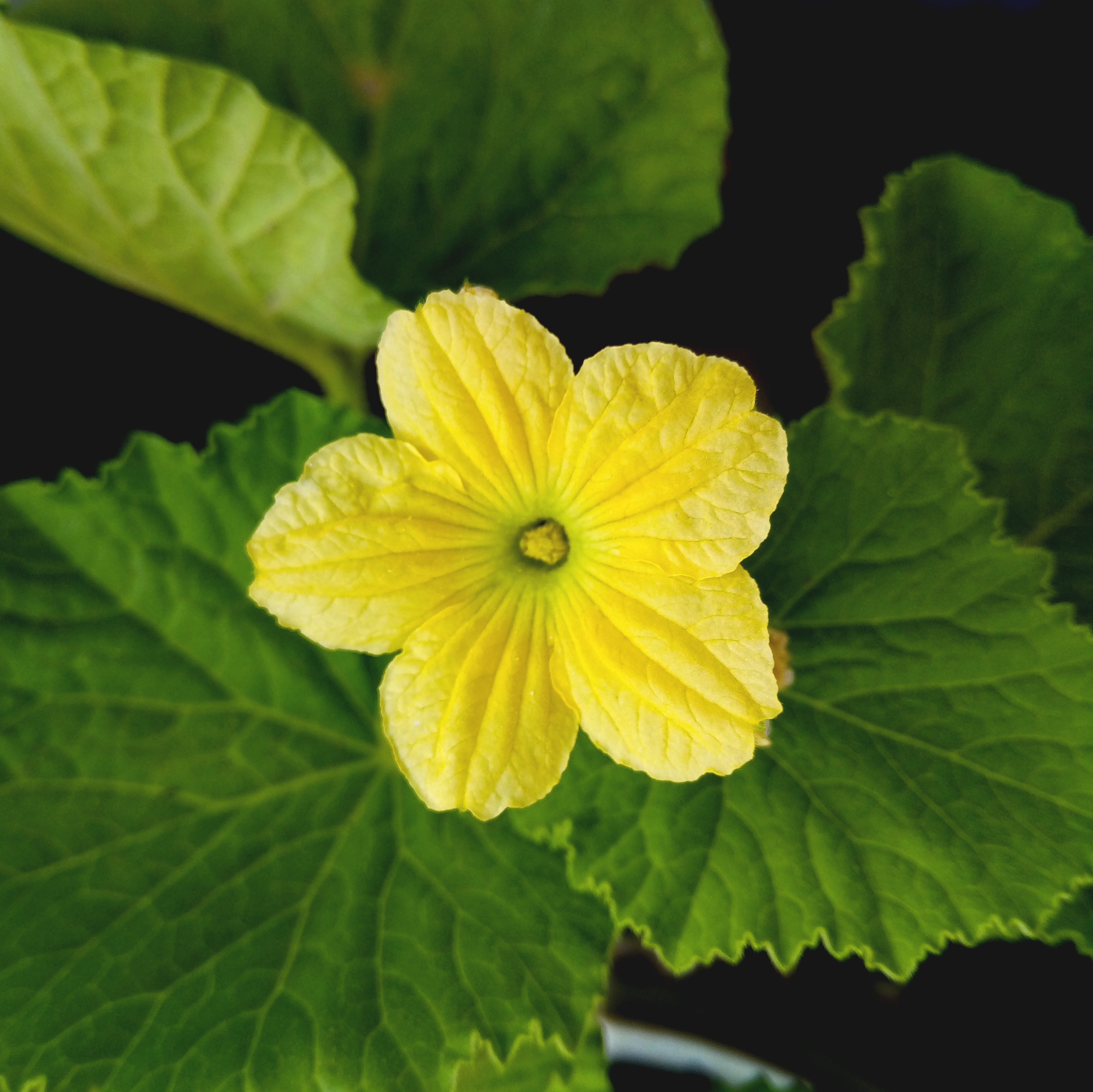
Honeydew melon yellow flower

== Production ==
Melon production, 2020
Country	Production (millions of tonnes)
China	13.83
Turkey	1.72
India	1.33
Iran	1.28
Afghanistan	0.79
United States	0.69
Guatemala	0.65
Brazil	0.61
World	27.4
Source: FAOSTAT of the United Nations

In 2018, world production of melons was 27 million tonnes, led by China with 46% of the total (table). Turkey, Iran, and India each produced more than 1 million tonnes.

Melon yield

Production of melon

== See also ==
- Cucurbita – Squash (plant)
- List of culinary fruits
- List of gourds and squashes
- List of melon dishes

== General references ==
- Mabberley, D.J. (1987). The Plant Book. A portable dictionary of the higher plants. Cambridge University Press. p. 706. ISBN 0-521-34060-8.
- Magness, J.R.; Markle, G.M.; Compton, C.C. (1971). "Food and feed crops of the United States". IR Bulletin. 1 (828). New Jersey Agricultural Experiment Station. OL 14117370M. Interregional Research Project IR-4
