= List of Cucumis melo var. reticulatus cultivars =

This is a list of all cultivars from the reticulatus group of melons, meaning melons that have netting on their skin, which are also known as 'muskmelons'. Varieties are not included on this list. The formal cultivar name of these cultivars will always be Cucumis melo var. reticulatus 'Cultivar Name' (for example: Cucumis melo var. reticulatus 'Anne Arundel').

== List ==
Common name	Description
'Amish'	Known for having a rich, sweet flavor and has orange flesh with yellow skin.
'Ananas D'Amerique A Chair Verte'	This melon has light green and fragrant, sweet flesh with yellow, netted skin.
'Anne Arundel'	It has green flesh and yellow, webbed skin when ripe.
'Bateekh Samara'	Its flesh is lime green and known to have a sweet, but also tart taste, along with a citrus flavor. It is an oblong fruit with brownish-green skin.
'Blenheim Orange'	A very fragrant cultivar with deep red-orange flesh and a thick rind.
'Delmonico'	The rind is dense, heavily netted, and has prominent ribs. The flesh is a salmon-orange color.
'Early Christiana'	This melon is slightly flat on the top and bottom. The flesh is orange and the skin is thin and tender, as well as being ribbed and netted. The skin's color is greenish-brown with patches of golden-brown.
'Emerald Gem'	Considered to be one of the finest cultivars, this melon has green, ribbed skin laced with webbing. It has pale orange flesh, and a very sweet flavor, with an aroma similar to both cardamom and cinnamon.
'Galia'	Dense netting with yellow skin and pale green flesh which is aromatic and has a signature spicy-sweet flavor.
'Ginger's Pride'	A huge melon, each one amassing an average of 14–22 lb (6.4–10.0 kg). It has yellowish skin and a sweet flavor.
'Golden Jenny'	The same as 'Jenny Lind', except with golden flesh.
'Green Citron'	It has yellowish-brown skin with green mottling, and yellow-green flesh. Its flavor is quite mild, but this cultivar produces fruit extremely early.
'Green Climbing'	A small melon with a hardy exterior, making it able to be stored as a winter melon. The skin is green flecked with pale green, and the flesh is also green, being very sweet and juicy.
'Ha'ogen'	An aromatic melon with flavorful green flesh.
'Hackensack'	The outside is hardy and netted, with deep ribs, as well as a golden color mottled with green. Its flesh is light green.
'Hale's Best 45'	It has bright orange flesh with a good flavor and dense, tan netting.
'Hami'	A very large melon, their skin is lightly netted and colored golden-yellow. Its flesh is pale yellow and refreshingly sweet.
'Hearts of Gold'	Has orange and firm, sweet flesh. Its skin is ribbed and green with heavy netting.
'Jenny Lind'	A small, turban-shaped melon, it has brownish-orange that's mottled with green. It has soft, light green flesh that is also sweet.
'Montreal Market'	A large cultivar, the skin is netted, ribbed, and green, mottled with greenish-yellow. The flesh is green and has an aromatic flavor said to be similar to crushed ginger leaves.
'Murray's Pineapple'	A small melon that has a green-fleshed and red-fleshed form. The red-fleshed one has slight ribs and light netting and green furrows on its outside. The flesh is a bright watermelon red and quite fragrant. The green-fleshed one is larger and has pale green flesh. Its skin is more heavily netted than the red.
'Persian'	The skin is heavily netted and a golden beige color, it has a strong floral scent and yellow-orange flesh with a buttery, but firm texture.
'Pixie'	A palm-sized cantaloupe cultivar which has irregular netting and a very sweet flavor.
'Rocky Ford'	Its skin is yellow-bronze and it has green flesh with a golden band near the seeds. It only seems to thrive in places similar to southern Colorado.
'Sharlyn'	The skin is yellow-orange and the flesh is pale orange. This cultivar has a mild, sweet flavor and smells both floral and tropical.
'Sweet Passion'	It has orange flesh and an orangish-tan outside. Its flesh is very sweet and succulent.
'Tommy Apple'	It has a sweet and mellow flavor, with the skin being golden, as well as the flesh.
