= Kajari melon =

Melon cultivar

- Genus: Cucumis
- Species: Cucumis melo
- Cultivar: 'Kajari'
- Origin: India

The Kajari melon, also known as the Delhi melon, is a honeydew cultivar originating in Punjab grown for its unique coloring.

== Description ==
It weighs 2–3 pounds (0.91–1.36 kilograms) and its thin rind is red-orange in color with green vertical stripes, and the interior flesh is green, similar to a honeydew. It is round to slightly oblate in shape. It is able to grow in relatively short seasons and is hardy to several USDA zones, including zone 6. The flavor is said to be similar to honeydew but sweeter. It was introduced to the United States around 2014 by botanical explorer Joseph Simcox.

== Availability ==
Seeds of the plant are available through several online sources.

== See also ==
- List of Cucumis melo var. reticulatus cultivars
