= Sprite melon =

Melon cultivar

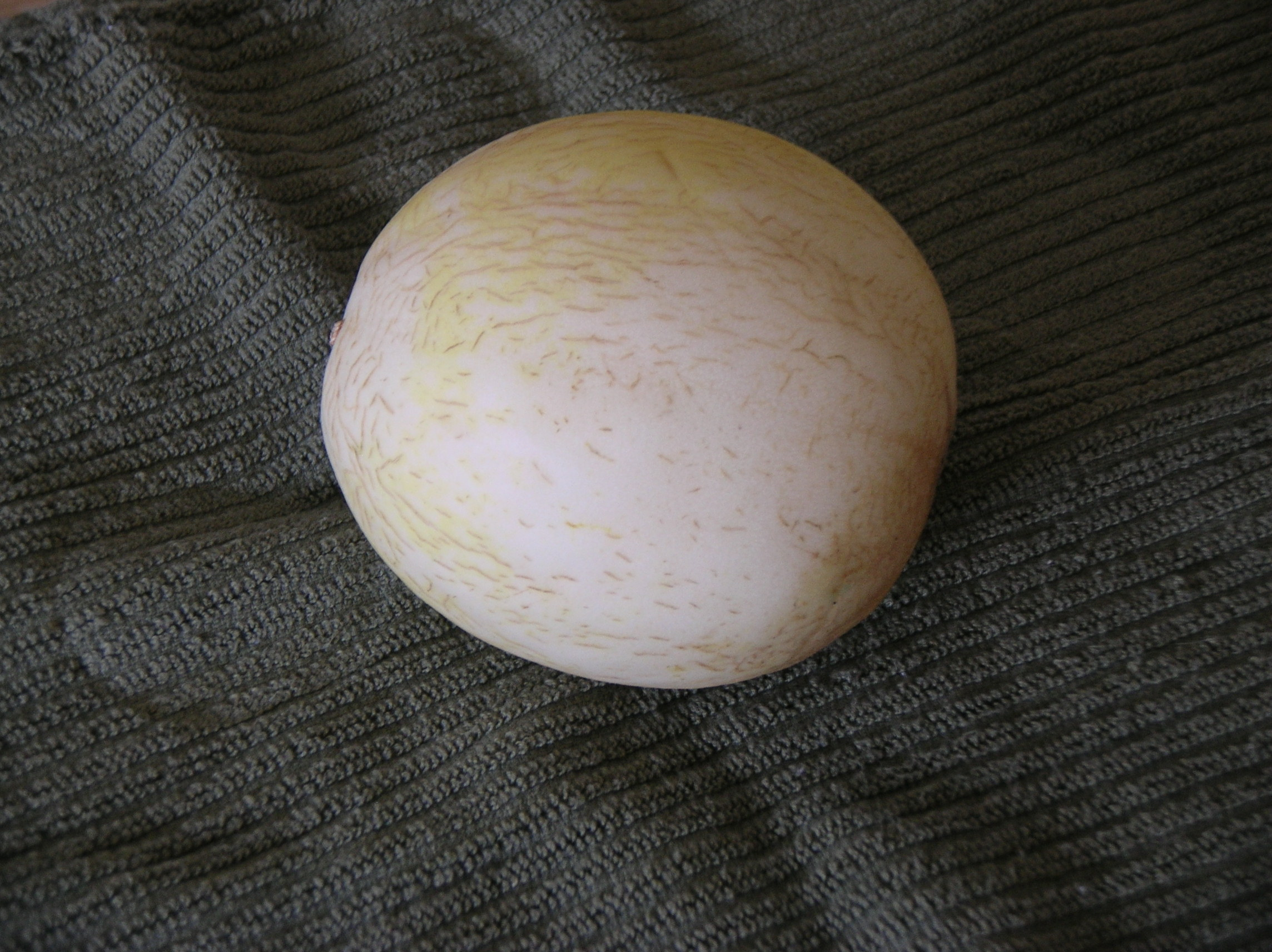
- Species: Cucumis melo
- Origin: Japan

The sprite melon is a kind of melon, similar to honeydew, which originates from Japan.

== History ==
The Sprite melon has been cultivated in North Carolina as a specialty crop since the 1990s. The melon has increased in popularity in recent years. It has been cultivated and developed throughout history by selective breeding into the modern melon we have today.

== Properties ==
A sprite melon has a round shape and is typically about the size of a grapefruit. It generally ranges in weight from 1.0 to 1.5 lbs. The flesh of a sprite melon is ivory in color and firm, while the peel ranges from ivory (unripe) to yellowish (ripe). As the melon reaches optimal ripeness, horizontal brown markings will appear near the stem. Sprite melon contains seeds. The firm, juicy, sweet flesh of the sprite melon is usually eaten for dessert and tends to resemble the flavor of both pears and honeydew. However, it is much sweeter than either of these; it can often consist of 18% sugar, making it 25% to 30% sweeter than other melons. The melon is a part of the family Cucurbitaceae, grouped in with cucumbers, gourds, and pumpkins.

Sprite melon, raw (edible parts)
Nutritional value per 100 g (3.5 oz)
- Energy: 150 kJ (36 kcal)
- Carbohydrates: 9.6 g
- Sugars: 9 g
- Dietary fiber: 333 mg
- Fat: 0.0 g
- Protein: 63.3 mg
Vitamins and minerals
Vitamins	Quantity %DV^{†}
Vitamin C	47% 42 mg
Minerals	Quantity %DV^{†}
Iron	4% 0.7 mg
- ^{†}Percentages estimated using US recommendations for adults, except for potassium, which is estimated based on expert recommendation from the National Academies.

== See also ==
- Melon
