= Bailan melon =

Variety of fruit

- Species: Cucumis melo
- Cultivar group: Inodorus Group

The Bailan melon (Chinese: 白蘭瓜) is a locally famous melon grown near Lanzhou, the capital city of Gansu province in the People's Republic of China. It is a variety of honeydew melon, globose to subglobose and typically has white skin with sweet, white or pale green, flesh. In photographs, the melons appear light yellow, orange or white, with a light green or apricot yellow flesh, which makes it similar in appearance to other types in the cultivar group of true melon. It is also heavy due to the density of the fruit's inner flesh. Like other types of honeydews, the Bailan melon is rich in Vitamin C and protein.

According to Chinese sources, the melons were introduced to China by Henry A. Wallace, Vice President of the United States, who donated melon seeds to the locals while visiting in the 1940s. Wallace had a background in agriculture and had founded a major seed company, Pioneer Hi-Bred. This is the reason the Chinese sometimes refer to the melon as the Hualaishi (an adaptation of the name "Wallace").

== Nutrients ==
As a species of melon, the Bailan melon contains bioactive compounds (BC) such as polyphenols, carotenoids, and fatty acids. Melons are considered as natural curatives which serve a preventive role against chronic diseases.
