= Santa Claus melon =

Variety of fruit

Piel de Sapo
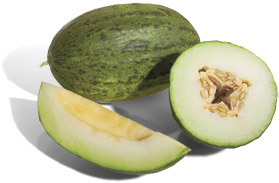
- Species: Cucumis melo
- Cultivar group: Ibericus Group
- Cultivar: 'Sancho', 'Grand Riado', 'Cordial', 'Manchego', etc.
- Origin: Spain

The Santa Claus melon, sometimes known as Christmas melon or Piel de Sapo (Toad Skin), is a type of true melon (family Cucurbitaceae, Cucumis melo, Inodorus group) originating in Spain that grows to about a foot in length and is ovoid in shape. It has a thick, green-striped outer rind and pale green to white inner flesh with a mild melon flavour and sweetness close to honeydew melons.

== Description ==
It has a blotched green peel after which it is named in Spanish (piel de sapo translates as "toad skin"). A closely related melon with the same shape but with a yellow peel is known as 'Amarillo', or canary melon. The attractive green and gold-to-bright yellow-striped Santa Claus melon somewhat resembles a small watermelon. Inside is a mellow and mildly flavoured, pale-greenish flesh very similar to that of a honeydew. The ripest Santa Claus melon will have soft blossom ends that yield to gentle pressure and a vibrant yellow hue.

This melon was named in English as recognition of its long-keeping qualities, i.e., "until Christmas".

== Cultivation ==
This melon is widely available in the Northern Hemisphere. Grown in California and Arizona, they are harvested from June through October. During the winter, Santa Claus melons are imported from South America. They are grown in Brazil and Central America to supply Europe during autumn, winter, and spring. In Australia, they are grown all year round and sold as "Piel de Sapo" and are said to last until Easter. Maturing about 110 days after planting, this melon can grow to 12 inches (30 cm) in length and half that in diameter.

=== Spain ===
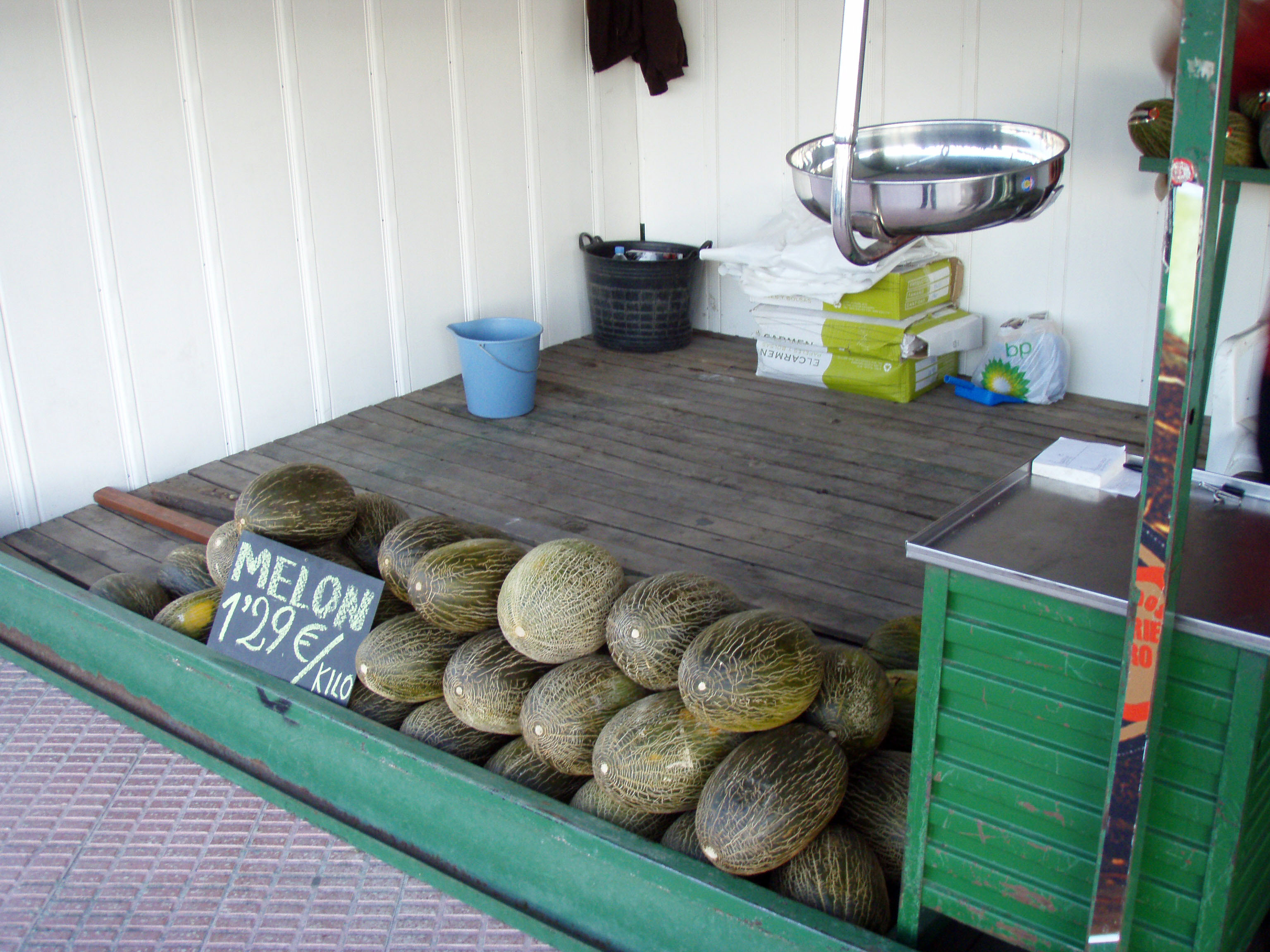
Piel de Sapo melon stand in the Madrid region

The Piel de Sapo originated in Spain, where it is widely grown with about 30,000 hectares (74,000 acres) cultivated annually. La Mancha is the main region in Spain producing this type, with 12,000 ha. Another important growing area is Murcia, which has specialized in growing early crops. There, they plant mainly in mid-March and harvest from mid-June to mid-July.

The most popular cultivar in the last 10 years in the main producing region of Spain (La Mancha) has been 'Sancho', a hybrid bred by the seedhouse Syngenta. Many open-pollinated cultivars were grown in Spain until recently, but hybrids have replaced them almost entirely, as they offer growers higher yields and better disease resistance. Old cultivars have been preserved in germplasm collections. They are grown outdoors with plantings starting in May and running until June. Production starts in mid-July and ends in September.

== Uses ==
The flesh of uncut melons is juicier and softer if kept at room temperature one or two days before serving. Once ripened or cut, it should be refrigerated in plastic. An excellent keeper, this hardy melon can be kept up to six weeks longer than other varieties.
