= Kolkhoznitsa melon =

Melon cultivar

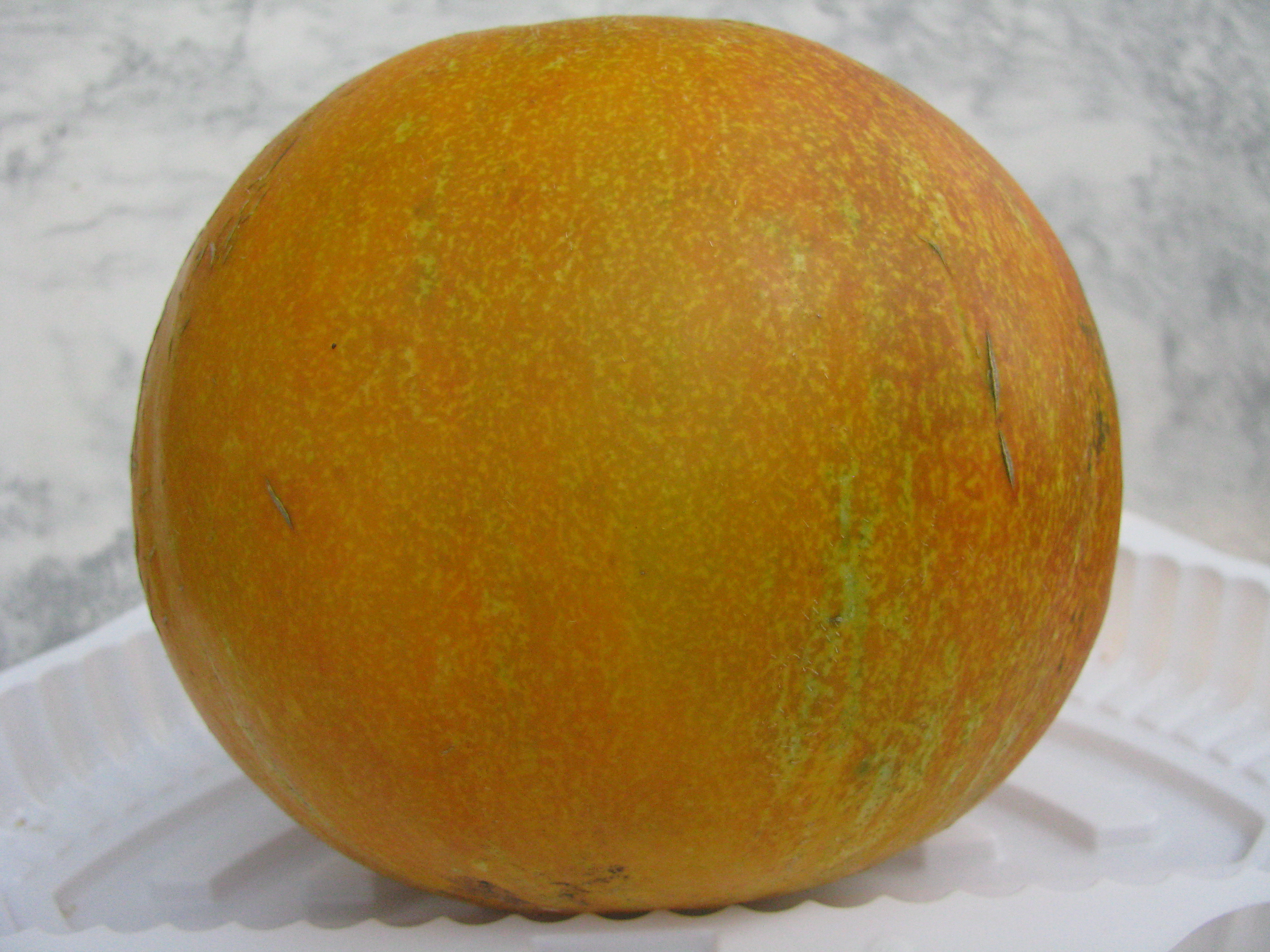
- Genus: Cucumis
- Species: Cucumis melo
- Cultivar group: Chandalak Group
- Cultivar: 'Kolkhoznitsa'
- Origin: Russia

The kolkhoznitsa melon, also known as the collective farm woman melon, is a melon in the genus Cucumis native to Russia and introduced to the United States in 1993.

== Description ==
The kolkhoznitsa melon was first bred by a Russian gardener in the 1930s, specifically for cool, shorter seasons. It then spread to other European countries such as Ukraine, eventually making its way to the United States. The rind is thin and golden-orange in color and the interior flesh is white and dense. It is round to slightly oblong in shape. The flavor is said to be sweet and it weighs up to 3 pounds (1.4 kilograms). The plant is cold-hardy and compact, growing an average of three melons per season.

== Name ==
The kolkhoznitsa melon was named for the form of collective farming in the Soviet Union known as kolkhoz.

== Availability ==
Seeds of the plant are available through several online sources.
