= Mirza melon =

Melon cultivar

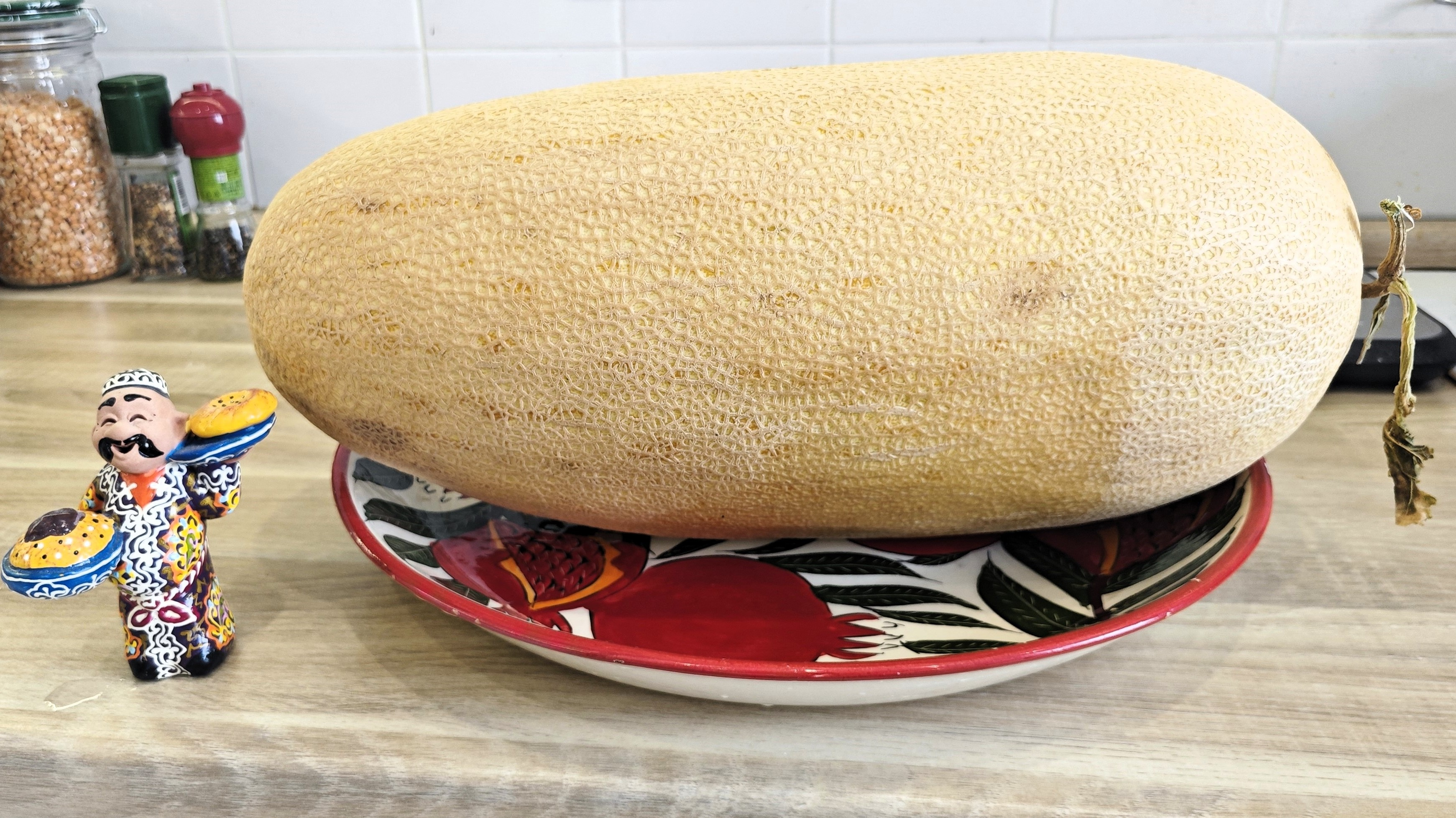
- Genus: Cucumis
- Species: Cucumis melo
- Cultivar group: Ameri Group
- Cultivar: 'Mirza' (or Mirzachul or Torpeda)
- Origin: Uzbekistan

The Mirza melon, also known as the torpedo melon, Mirzachul melon, or gulabi melon, is a cultivar of sweet melon in the genus Cucumis native to Uzbekistan and Central Asia and introduced to California.

== Description ==
They are large, weighing up to 25 pounds (11 kilograms) and measuring up to 24 inches (61 centimeters) in length. They have an elongated shape and the rind is creamy yellow in color with beige streaking and the interior flesh is white and quite juicy. The flavor has been described as sweet and savory. In Uzbekistan, disfigured melons are typically harvested overripe and then sliced and sun-dried. The plant demands light and heat, and may be affected by powdery mildew. The fruit bursts easily.

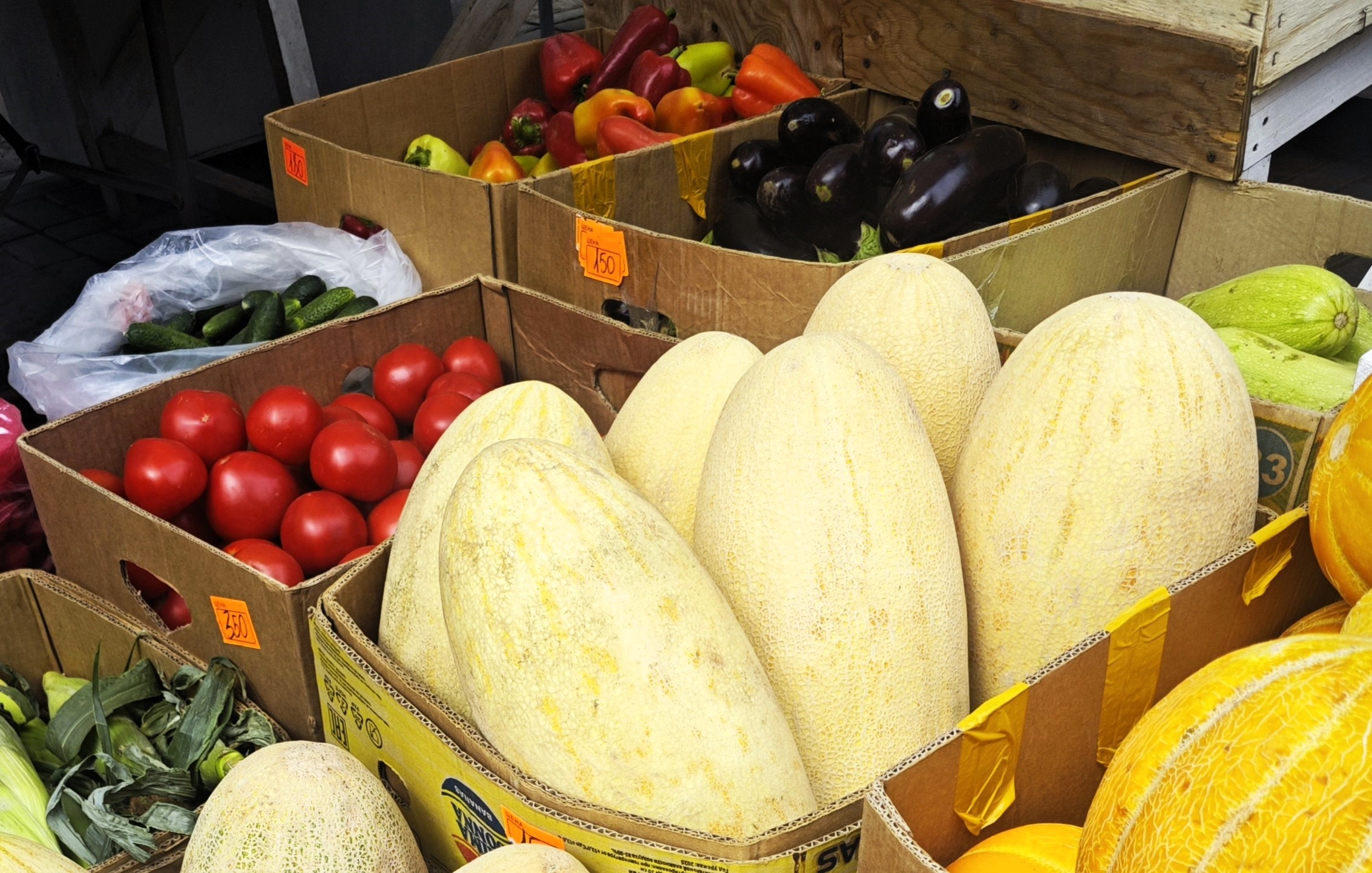
Mirza melon a.k.a. Torpedo melon or Mirzachul melon seen on fruit stall in Moscow

== Naming ==
The name Mirza has Persian roots and means "prince" or "high nobleman".

== Availability ==
It is sometimes sold at various farmers' markets throughout California and the seeds are available through several online sources.
