= Banana melon =

Melon cultivar

- Genus: Cucumis
- Species: Cucumis melo
- Cultivar: 'Banana'
- Origin: United States

The banana melon is an heirloom melon in the genus Cucumis originating from around 1880 in the United States.

== Description ==
It weighs 5–10 pounds (2.3–4.5 kilograms) and measures 16–24 inches (41–61 centimeters) in length. Its name derives from its elongated, pointed shape and yellow rind, reminiscent of a banana, as well as its strong banana-like scent. Its soft flesh is salmon-colored and is said to have a very sweet flavor. It was a popular variety in the late 19th century, being noted by James J. H. Gregory as attracting much attention at agricultural fairs.

== Availability ==
Seeds of the plant are available through several online sources.
