= Persian melon =

Melon cultivar

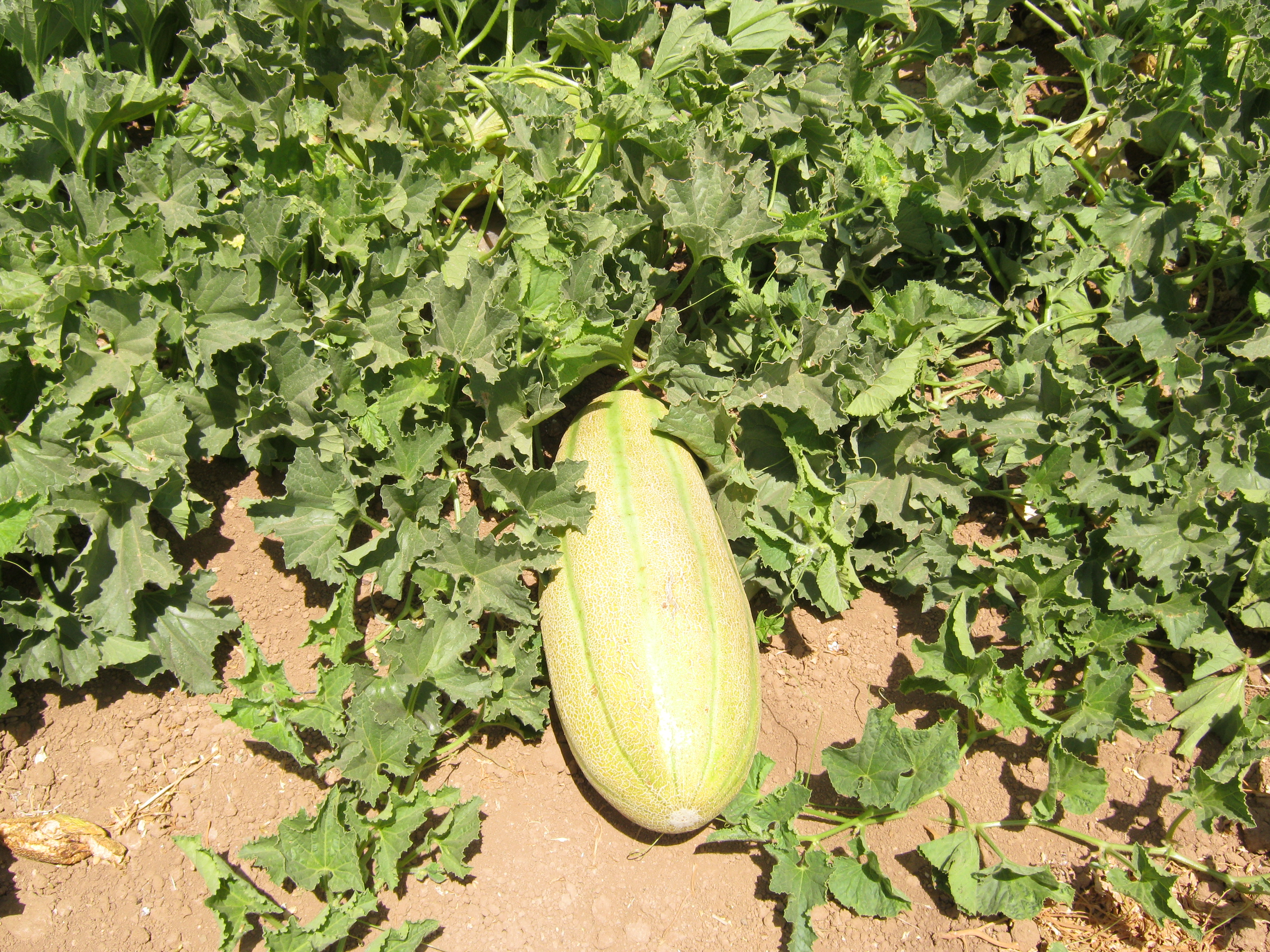
Persian melon

Persian melons (Persian: خربزه) are cultivars of Cucumis melo, a type of melon. They are elongate, unridged, with dark green skin with irregular yellowish bands, and flesh of a deep green colour.
