= Canary melon =

Melon cultivar

Amarillo Oro
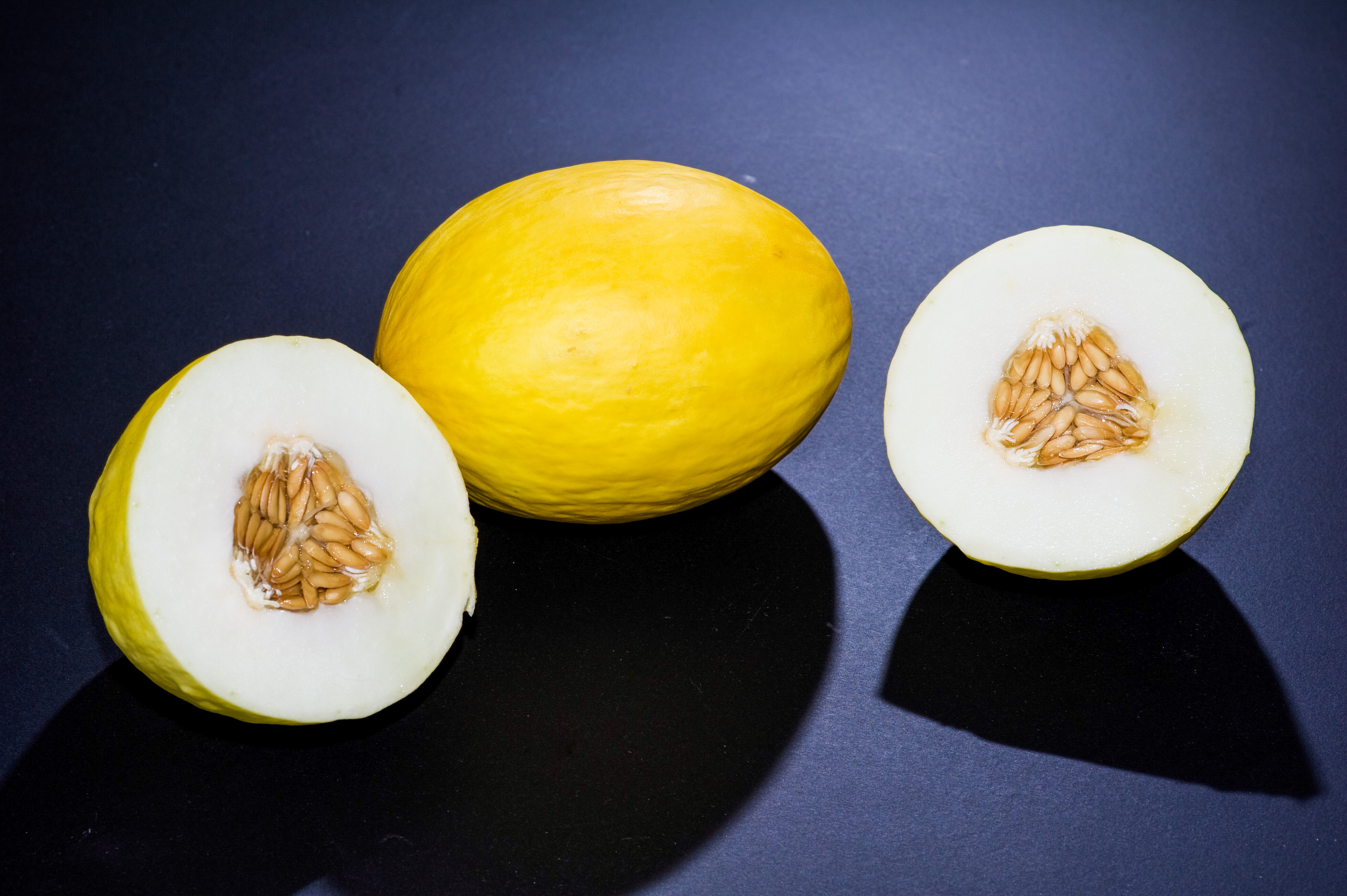
- Species: Cucumis melo
- Cultivar group: Ibericus group
- Cultivar: 'Amarillo Canario', 'Ducral', 'Doral', 'Piel de Sol', 'Robleo' 'Tweety', etc.
- Origin: Spain

The Canary melon is a large, bright-yellow elongated winter melon (Cucumis melo Inodorus Group; not to be confused with the wax gourd, also called winter melon) or Spanish melon (Cucumis melo Ibericus Group) with a yellow rind and a pale green to white inner flesh.

This melon has a distinctively sweet flavor that is slightly tangier than a honeydew melon. The flesh looks like that of a pear but is softer. When ripe, the rind has a slightly waxy feel. The name comes from its bright yellow color, which resembles that of the canary. This melon is often marketed as the Juan Canary melon and can be found in various sizes and shapes. This melon is common in parts of Asia including Japan and South Korea, Sicily, Algeria, and Morocco. Varieties include the smaller, round Fonzy melon, cultivated in Mexico.

They are best stored at 15 °C (59 °F).

== See also ==
- List of culinary fruits
