= Honeydew (melon) =

Melon cultivar

Honeydew melon
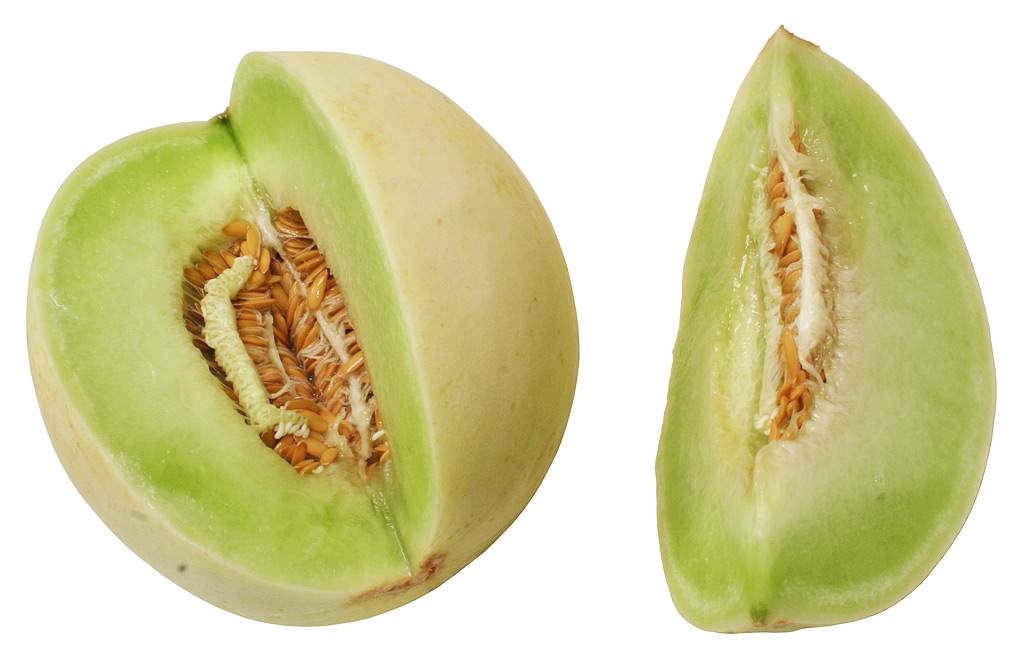
- Species: Cucumis melo
- Cultivar group: Inodorus group
- Origin: North Africa (Morocco to Egypt), Southern France, Spain

Honeydew melon (raw)
Nutritional value per 100 g (3.5 oz)
- Energy: 150 kJ (36 kcal)
- Carbohydrates: 9.09 g
- Sugars: 8.12 g
- Dietary fiber: 0.8 g
- Fat: 0.14 g
- Protein: 0.54 g
Vitamins and minerals
Vitamins	Quantity %DV^{†}
Thiamine (B1)	3% 0.038 mg
Riboflavin (B2)	1% 0.012 mg
Niacin (B3)	3% 0.418 mg
Pantothenic acid (B5)	3% 0.155 mg
Vitamin B6	5% 0.088 mg
Folate (B9)	5% 19 μg
Vitamin C	20% 18 mg
Vitamin K	2% 2.9 μg
Minerals	Quantity %DV^{†}
Calcium	0% 6 mg
Iron	1% 0.17 mg
Magnesium	2% 10 mg
Manganese	1% 0.027 mg
Phosphorus	1% 11 mg
Potassium	8% 228 mg
Sodium	1% 18 mg
Zinc	1% 0.09 mg
- Link to USDA Database entry
- ^{†}Percentages estimated using US recommendations for adults, except for potassium, which is estimated based on expert recommendation from the National Academies.

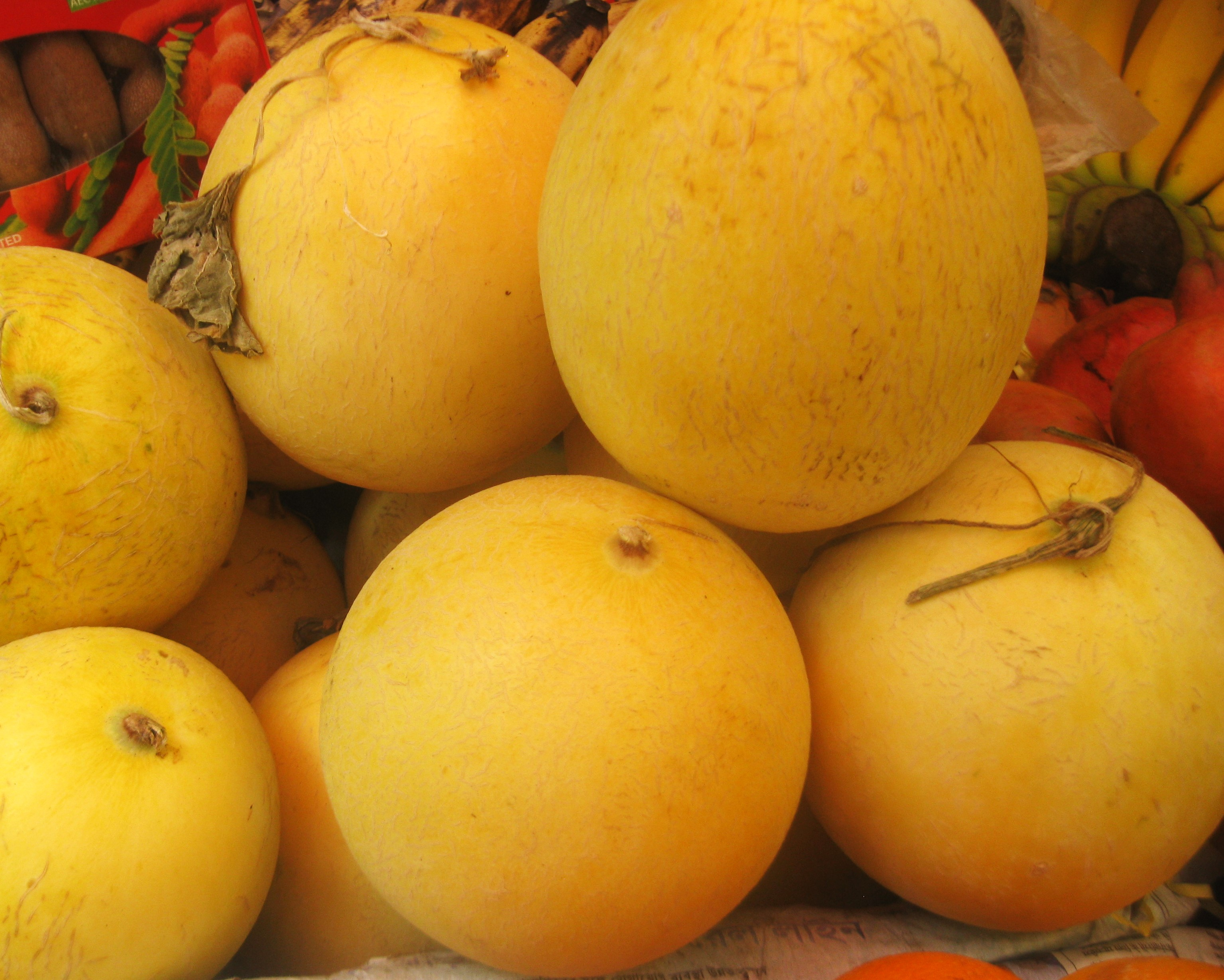
Honeydew melon, Kolkata, West Bengal, India

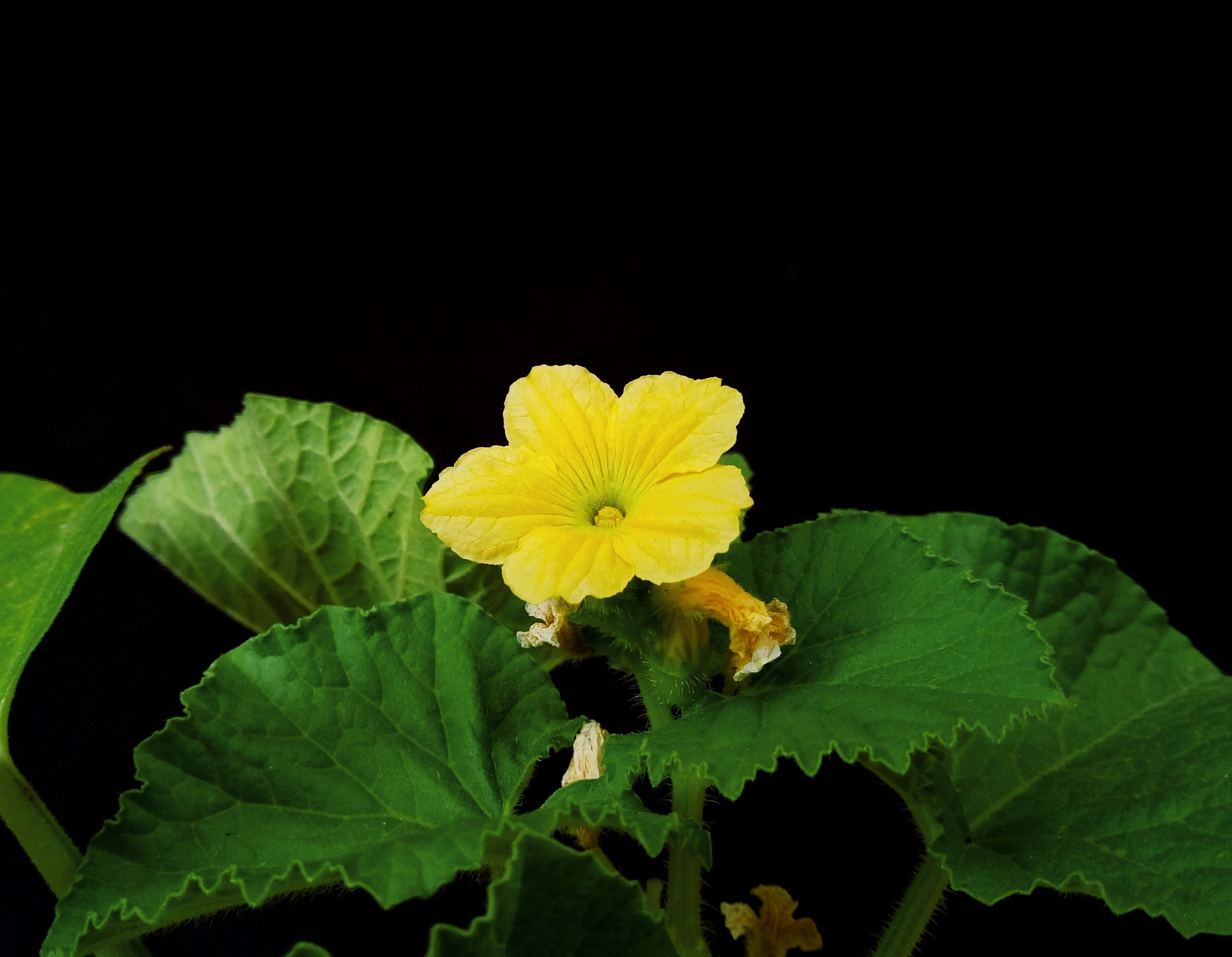
Honeydew melon flower

The honeydew melon is one of the two main cultivar types in Cucumis melo Inodorus Group. It is characterized by the smooth, often green or yellowish rind and lack of musky odor. The other main type in the Inodorus Group is the wrinkle-rind casaba melon.

== Characteristics ==
A honeydew has a round to slightly oval shape, typically 15–22 cm (5.9–8.7 in) long. It generally ranges in weight from 1.8 to 3.6 kg (4.0 to 7.9 lb). The flesh is usually pale green in color, while the smooth peel ranges from greenish to yellow. Like most fruit, honeydew has seeds. Its seeds contain high levels of polyunsaturated fatty acids. The inner flesh is eaten, often for dessert, and honeydew is commonly found in supermarkets across the world alongside cantaloupe melons and watermelons. In California, honeydew is in season from August until October.

This fruit grows best in semiarid climates and is harvested based on maturity, not size. Maturity can be hard to judge, but it is based upon the rind color ranging from greenish white (immature) to creamy yellow (mature). Maturity can also be judged by the blossom-end giving when pressed with the thumb, in addition to having a pleasant aroma. Quality is also determined by the honeydew having a nearly spherical shape with a surface free of scars or defects. A honeydew should also feel heavy for its size and have a waxy rather than a fuzzy surface. This reflects the integrity and quality of its flesh as the weight can be attributed to the high water content of the ripened fruit.

== Nutrition ==
The honeydew is 90% water, 9% carbohydrates, 0.1% fat, and 0.5% protein. Like most melons, it is an excellent source of vitamin C, with one cup containing 56% of the recommended daily value. The honeydew is also a good source of vitamin B thiamine, as well as other B vitamins and the mineral potassium. In addition, it is low in calories compared to many other high potassium fruits such as bananas, with only 36 calories per 100g. However, the honeydew contains only negligible amounts of most other vitamins and minerals.

== Origin and alternate names ==
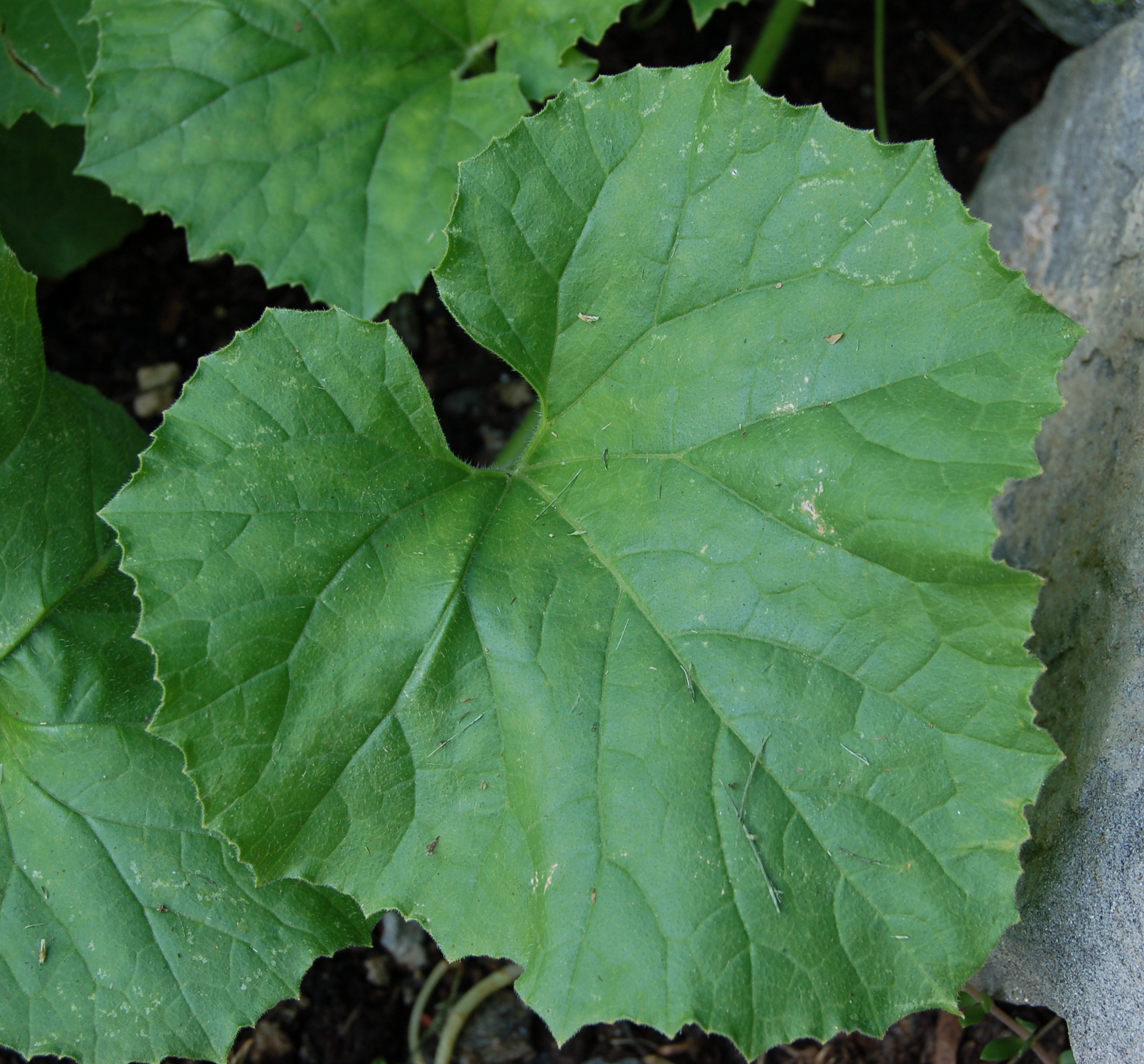
The leaf of a honeydew

"Honeydew" is the American name for the White Antibes cultivar which has been grown for many years in southern France and Algeria.

In China, honeydews are known as Bailan melons. They are famous locally near Lanzhou, the capital city of Gansu province in China's northwest.

According to Chinese sources, the melons were introduced to China by American Secretary of Agriculture, Henry A. Wallace, who donated melon seeds to the locals while visiting in the 1940s (probably 1944). Wallace served as Secretary of Agriculture and Vice President under president Franklin D. Roosevelt. In 1926, Wallace had founded a major seed company (Pioneer Hi-Bred) and popularized the use of hybridized corn. He also had a general background and interest in agriculture.

As a result of Wallace's introduction of the crop, in China the melon is sometimes called the Wallace (Chinese: 华莱士; pinyin: Hualaishi). The Mizo people use the name Hmazil, the Garo people and the Chakma people of Chittagong Hill Tracts use the name Chindire and the Tanchangya people call it Te'e in their local language.

In some parts of Latin America, especially in Chile, the honeydew is nicknamed "Melón tuna" ("prickly pear melon").

== See also ==
- List of culinary fruits
- Santa Claus melon – a close relative with a similar-tasting fruit
- Winter melon – a gourd originating in Southeast Asia that is used in Indian and Chinese cuisine. The winter melon variety of honeydew should not be confused with this plant.
