= Passiflora quetzal =

Scientific classification
- Kingdom: Plantae
- Clade: Tracheophytes
- Clade: Angiosperms
- Clade: Eudicots
- Clade: Rosids
- Order: Malpighiales
- Family: Passifloraceae
- Genus: Passiflora
- Species: P. quetzal

Binomial name
- Passiflora quetzal MacDougal

Species of vine

Passiflora quetzal is a species of flowering plant native to Mexico and Guatemala described in 2004. It is named after the quetzal, which inhabits the area.

== Taxonomy ==
Passiflora quetzal has been assigned to supersection Hahniopathanthus in subgenus Decaloba.

== Distribution and habitat ==
Passiflora quetzal is native to Southwestern Chiapas, Mexico, and western San Marcos, Guatemala. It has been found growing at 1800–2400 metres in wet mountain forest.

== Description ==
The vine is glabrous. The stems are terete and glaucous. Stipules are 10-19 × 10-20mm, depressed ovate, auriculate, clasping, widely obtuse, abruptly acute and apiculate-mucronlate to abruptly long-acuminate, and the margin entire to obscurely crenulate and 8-15 glandular. Petioles are (1-)2- glandular near or proximal to the middle. Nectaries are 0.6-0.8 × 0.4-0.9 mm. Blades are 7-11.5 × 7.5-11.5 cm, subpeltate 2-3(-3.5) mm from the margin, entire or glandular-denticulate at the very base, not variegated at maturity, very widely obovate to widely elliptic or ± circular, at base extremely shallowly cordate to truncate or slightly rounded. Leaves are shallowly to obscurely 3-lobed, with lateral lobes that are broadly obtuse to rounded or nearly obsolete, and a central lobe that is obtuse or somewhat rounded to truncate. Laminar nectaries are marginal, with 4 or 5 gland borne basally, (0)1 to 8 glands borne just proximal to the lateral veins, and (0)2 to 8 glands borne marginally distal to the lateral veins. Penduncles are (1)2 per node, 3.6-5.8 cm, and uniflorous. There are 2 bracts at the apex of the peduncle, which are 0.9-1.3 × 1.0-1.3 cm, ovate to widely ovate-oblong, cordate, free to the base, entire, 6- to 12-glandular marginally, obtuse to rounded, apiculate or abruptly long-acuminate, and light green. Flowers are white to green-white; stipe 2.5–5 mm; hypanthium diameter about 15 mm; sepals 18-20 × 9–10 mm, oblong to triangular, rounded at apex; petals 12 × 7 mm, ovate and narrowed at the base; coronal filaments in 2 to 3 series, the outermost 16–20 mm and filiform, the inner 1 to 2 series 7–10 mm; operculum 4.5-5.0 mm, membranous, plicate; limen edge at least 1.5 mm high; androgynophore 8.5–9 mm, free staminal filaments about 6 mm, anthers about 5 mm; ovary 3.8-4.0 × 2.3-2.5 mm, ovoid elipsoid, glabrous; styles at least 9 mm long including stigmas. The fruit is about 6 × 3.5 cm, ellipsoid, with stipe absent or less than 4 mm; seeds 5.3-6.0 × 3.5-3.9 × 2.0 mm. obovate in outline, campylotropous, the testa reticulate with about 50 to 60 pits, the chalazal beak include toward the raphe.

While there are many marginal laminar nectary glands located at the base of the lamina and marginally on the leaf between primary veins, smaller leaves tend to lack some marginal nectaries. The flowers are similar to those of Passiflora guatemalensis and to some forms of Passiflora hahnii. The bracts are smaller, however. The species resembles some examples of Passiflora membranacea.
