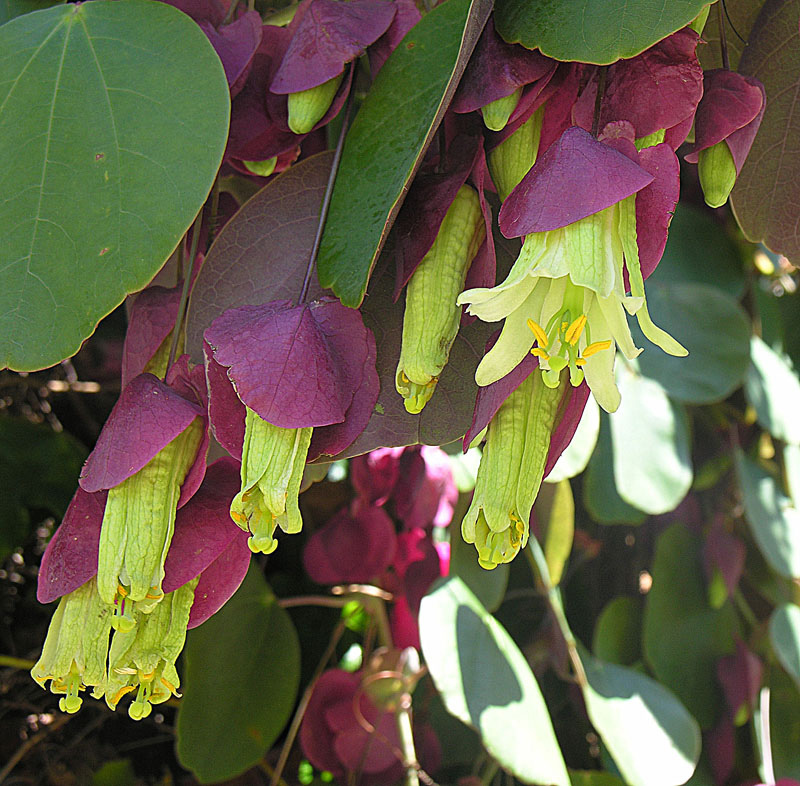

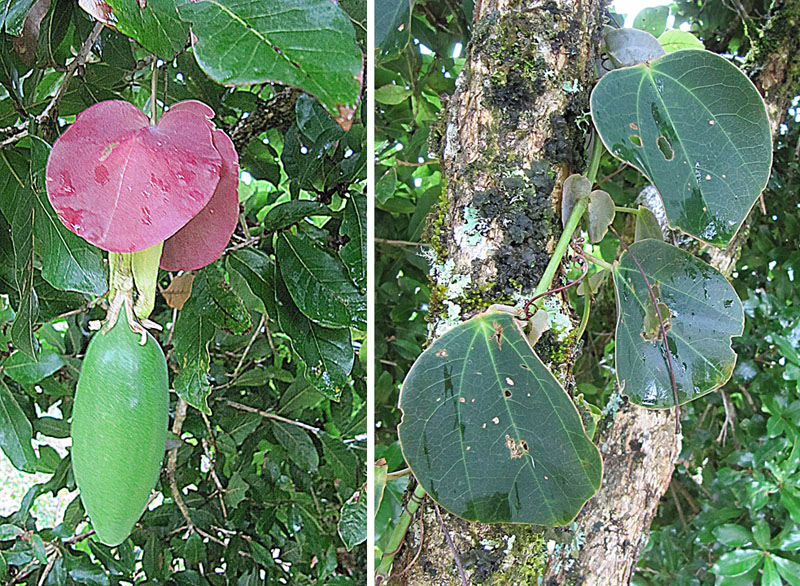

Scientific classification
- Kingdom: Plantae
- Clade: Tracheophytes
- Clade: Angiosperms
- Clade: Eudicots
- Clade: Rosids
- Order: Malpighiales
- Family: Passifloraceae
- Genus: Passiflora
- Species: P. membranacea

Binomial name
- Passiflora membranacea Benth. 1841

= Passiflora membranacea =

Species of vine

Passiflora membranacea is a species of Passiflora from Costa Rica, Guatemala, and El Salvador.

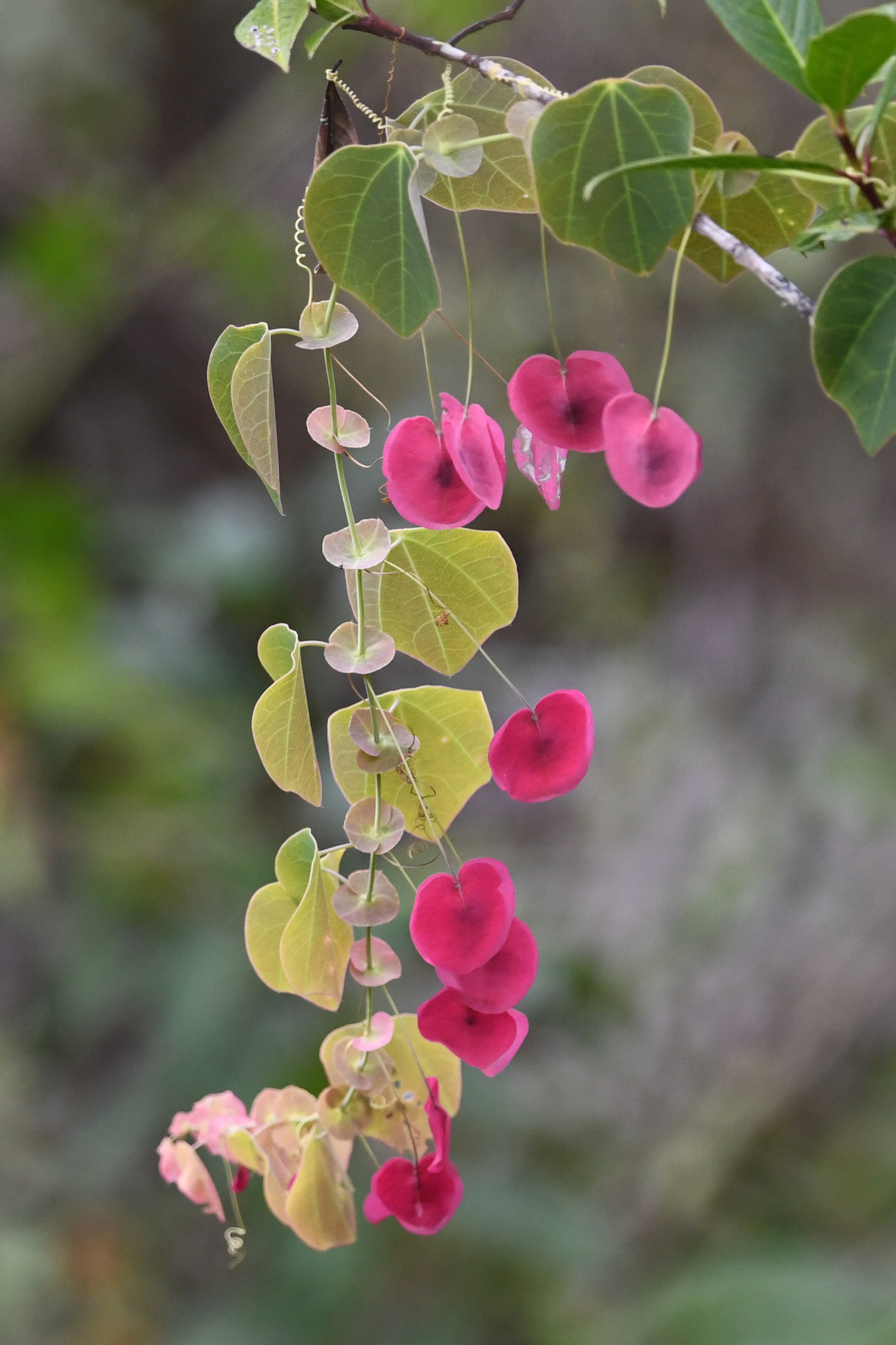
In Costa Rica
