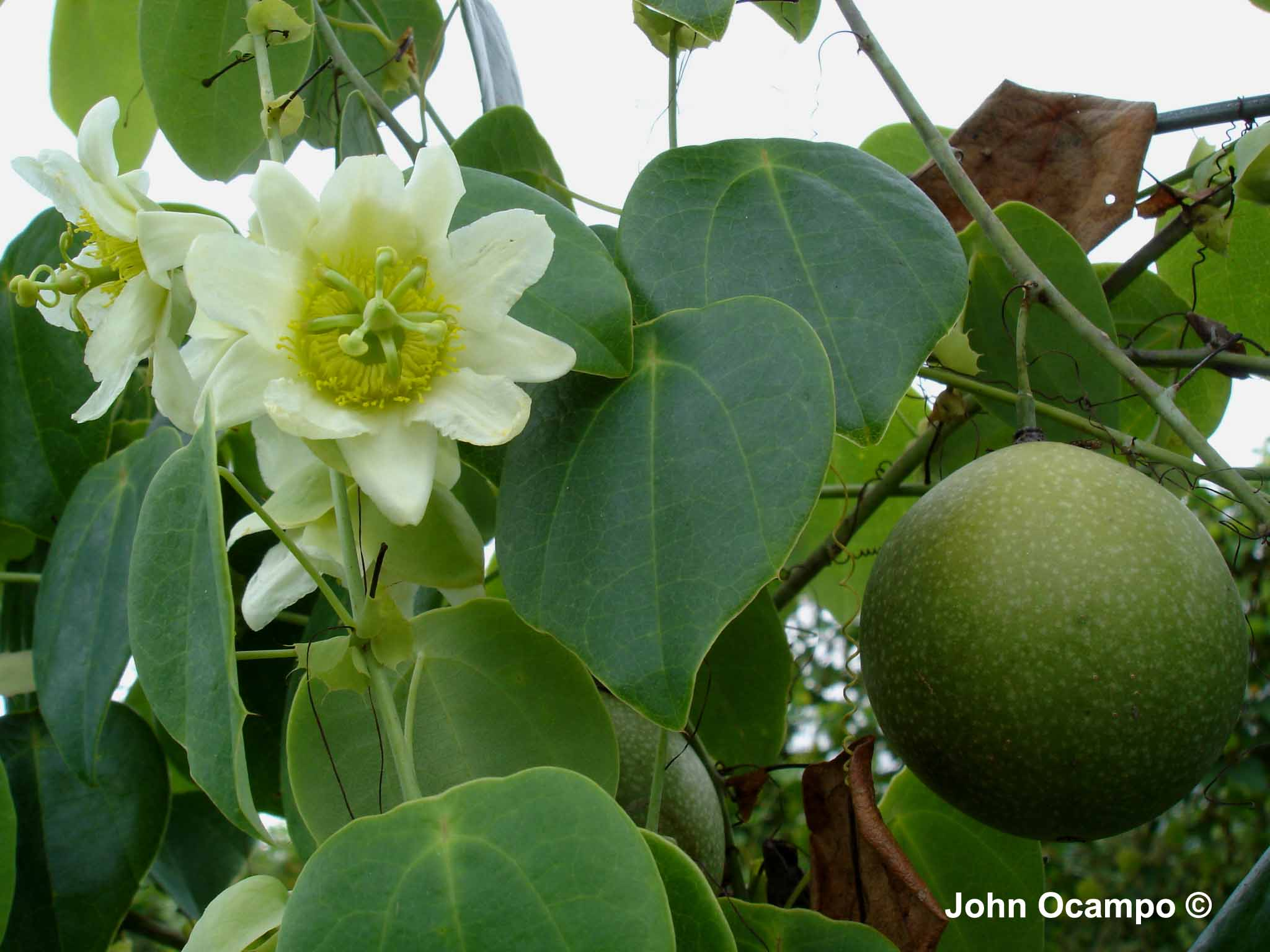

Scientific classification
- Kingdom: Plantae
- Clade: Tracheophytes
- Clade: Angiosperms
- Clade: Eudicots
- Clade: Rosids
- Order: Malpighiales
- Family: Passifloraceae
- Genus: Passiflora
- Species: P. guatemalensis

Binomial name
- Passiflora guatemalensis S.Watson

= Passiflora guatemalensis =

Species of vine

Passiflora guatemalensis, the Guatemala passion vine, is a species in the family Passifloraceae. It is native to Guatemala, and found from southern Mexico through Central America to Venezuela.

Passiflora guatemalensis is a species that can grow large, has purple undersides on the 'decorative' leaves, and white flowers. It is planted in conservatories and subtropical gardens.
