= List of pear cultivars =

Over 3000 cultivars of the pear are known. The following is a list of the more common and important cultivars, with the year and place of origin (where documented) and an indication of whether the pears are for cooking, eating, canning, drying or making perry. Those varieties marked agm have gained the Royal Horticultural Society's Award of Garden Merit. Those varieties marked FCC have gained the Royal Horticulatural Society's First Class Certificate.

== Cultivars ==
Common name	Synonyms	Image	Origin	First developed and introduced	Comment	Use and Cold storage	Harvest (days from full bloom) and Fireblight susceptibility F1 =very resistant, F5 = very susceptible.
Abate Fetel	Abbé Fetel		France	1869	Scab susceptible. A major cultivar in Italy	Eating -1 °C 90 days	140–165 F3
Alexander Lucas	Lucas, Lukas, Beurré Alexander		Loire et Cher, France	1870, introduced 1874	Triploid	eating -0.5 °C 120 days.	157 F1
Alfa							F1
Ambrosia			Indiana, US	cross made 1978	Pick mid August. Tolerant to fire blight.	eating. 1 °C 42 days	
Angelys			Angers, France	introduced 1999	Parentage Doyenné d' hiver x Doyenné du Comice. Pick 10 days after Doyenne du Comice	eating, -0.5^{o} 180 days	F4
Angouleme see Duchesse d'Angouleme
Anjou see Beurré D'Anjou
Anjou Red					Sport of anjou with a red surface color. Not as vigorous as Anjou.		
Ayers			United States		an interspecific P. communis× P. pyrifolia hybrid		
Bambinella			Malta				
Bartlett see Williams
Bartlett Max Red			Europe	1945	A red sport of Bartlett. Slightly more fire blight resistant than Bartlett		
Bartlett Red Sensation	Sensation Red Bartlett		Australia	1940	A red sport of Bartlett. Tree is slower growing.		
Beth			England	introduced 1974	AGM in 1993. Parentage Beurre Superfin x Williams Bon Chretien.		
Beurre d' Anjou	D' Anjou, Beurré Gris,		France	<1628		eating -0.5 °C 150 days	140–165 F2
Beurré d'Arenberg see Glou Morceau
Beurré Bedford			Bedford, England	Raised 1902, introduced 1921	Parentage Marie Louise x Durondeau	Eating in October and November	
Bell			West Virginia, US	cross made 1983	Fire blight resistant.	eating	
Beurré Bosc see Bosc
Beurré Clairrgeau see Clairgeau
Beurré Diel			Belgium	<1830		eating -0.5 °C 120 days	
Beurré Durandeau	De Tongrés, Tongeren, Tongern, Tongre, Durandeau, Durondeau			<1823	Pick late September – early October.	eating, canning -0.5 °C 150 days	
Beurré Giffard	Giffard		Angers, France	1825	Poor keeper	eating	100–120
Beurré d'Hardenpont see Glou Morceau
Beurré Hardy	Hardy, Beurre Hardy, ge. Gellerts Butterbirne		Boulogne-sur-Mer, France	c1820, introduced c1840	AGM in 1993. Biennial bearing.	Eating -0.5 °C 90 days	130–150 F2
Beurré de Mérode see Doppelte Philipp
Beurré Superfin			Angers, France	1837	AGM in 2006. Ripens in late September.	Eating	
Black Worcester			England		a cooking pear that keeps well	Cooking	
Blake's Pride			United States	cross made 1965, introduced 1998	derived from a cross of US 446 x US 505, made by H.J. Brooks		
Blanquilla	'pera de agua' and 'blanquilla de Aranjuez'		Spain			eating	100–130 F1
Bon Chrétien see Willams
Bonne de Malines see Winter Nelis
Bon Rouge					cultivar derived from a rare, spontaneous bud mutation of the green pear cultivar William’s Bon Chretien		
Bosc	Beurré Bosc, Bosc's Flaschenbirne, Kaiser Alexander		Belgium	<1807	Good for eating, baking, cooking, broiling, especially poaching.	eating, baking -1 °C 120 days	150–165 F1
Bristol Cross			Bristol, England	cross made 1920	Parentage Williams x Conference	eating	142
Butirra Precoce Morettini	Beurré précoce Morettini		Florence, Italy	1956	Parentage: Coscia x Williams (Bartlett) made by Morettini. Tree is vigorous. Ripens 20 days before Bartlett. One of the best early pears.	eating	100–125
Carmen			Italy	cross made 1980, selected 1989, introduced 2000	Pick 18 days before Bartlett.	eating	
Cascade			Oregon, US	1975	A red-skinned pear. Parentage Bartlett Max Red x Doyenné du Comice.	eating	
Catillac	Cadillac, De Citrouille, De Bell, Grand-Mogul, Grand-Tamerlan, Monstrueuse des Landes, Pound Pear, Tete-de-Chat		France	<1665	scab resistant pear for organic gardening.	Cooking	
Celina	QTee		Sweden & Norway	cross made 1985, selected 1997	Pick 17 days before Conference. Parentage Colorée de Juillet x Bartlett.	eating	
Charneu, Charneux see Fondante de Charneux
Chojuro			Japan	1895		eating	140–155
Churchland							
Clairgeau	Beurré Clairgeau		Nantes, France	c.1830, introduced 1851	Tree is healthy and productive. Excellent dessert quality.	eating, cooking -0.5 °C 60 days	
Clapp's Favourite	Clapps		Dorchester, Massachusetts, US	c. 1860, introduced 1867	Susceptible to scab. Very susceptible to fireblight	eating -0.5 °C 60 days	105–130
Clara Frijs	Comtesse Clara Frijs		Skensved, Denmark	<1858	major cultivar in Denmark	Eating	
Claude Blanchet			Vienne, Isère, France by M BLANCHET	1877	Random seedling		
Colorée de Juillet	Bunte Juli		Rouen, France	1857, introduced 1867		eating	90
Comtesse de Paris	Paris		Eure-et-Loire, France	1884?, 1893?	Pick late October. Use December–February	eating -0.5 °C 180 days	165
Concorde			England	introduced 1984	AGM in 1993. Susceptible to fireblight. Parentage Doyenné du Comice x Conference		
Condo			Wageningen, Netherlands	1965	Parentage Conference x Doyenné du Comice	-1^{o} C 120 days	
Conference	Rivers' Conference		Sawbridgeworth, Hertfordshire, England	1884, introduced 1894	FCC in 1885. AGM in 1993. Susceptible to fireblight and canker.	eating -0.5 °C 120 days	160–180 F1
Corella		Corella (Forelle) pears	Australia	late 19th century	Barossa Valley in southern Australia by German settlers		
Coscia			Italy	<1800	very early maturing cultivar	eating	90–120 F1
Curé see Poire de Curé
D'Anjou see Beurré d' Anjou
Delfrap	Delbard Premiere		France	1955	Preharvest drop.	eating	
Dessertnaja							
Dicolor					pick late september	eating	F4
Don Guindo			Spain		strong yellow, flavoured taste		
Doppelte Philipp	Beurré de Mérode, Doyenné de Mérode, Albertine, Doyenné Boussoch		Belgium	c.1800, introduced 1819	Pick september. Use November		
Doyenné d' hiver see Easter Beurre							
Doyenné du Comice	Comice, Vereinsdekant, Offered as "Royal Riviera Pears" by Harry & David		Angers, France	<1849	FCC in 1900. AGM in 1993. Biennial bearing. Preharvest drop. Vigorous tree, erratic cropper.	eating -0.5 °C 90 days	150–170 F5
Doyenné de Mérode see Doppelte Philip
Drouard see President Drouard
Dr. Jules Guyot			Troyes, France	c1870 Introduced 1875	Scab resistant pear for organic gardening. Poor keeper.	eating, 0 C 25 days	105–125 F2
Duchess	Dyushes, Dushes		England? France?	late 18th c.	Pick early October	eating, canning	
Duchesse d'Angouleme	Angouleme		France	1809, introduced 1815	Large tree, bears reulary. Good fire blight resistance.	eating	150–170
Durondeau se Beurré Durondeau
Earlibrite							
Easter Beurré	Doyenné d' hiver, Winterdechantsbirne		Belgium	c1823	Use December- March	eating	160–185
Edelcrassane see Passe Crassane
Eden			Israel				
Eldorado			California, US	1945	Very good to excellent quality. Long storage life.	Eating, Canning	140–160 F1
Elektra							F5
Epine du Mas	Belle de Limoges, Beurré Rochechouart, du Mas		Rochechouart, France	<1847		eating, 0 C 100 days	
Flamingo			South Africa	introduced 1993	Parentage Bon Rouge x Forelle. Flesh: creamy white, soft.	eating	
Flemish Beauty	Fondante des Bois		Flanders, Belgium	1810	Hardy to -45 degrees F.	Eating, drying	160–180
Fondante d'Automne			France	c. 1825	An old Flemish variety raised by Fievee at Maubeuge		
Fondante de Charneux	Charneux, Merveille de Charneu, Köstliche von Charneeux, Légipont, Merveille de Charneu, Waterloo,		Charneux, Belgium	c1800	Susceptible to fireblight	eating -0.5 °C 100 days	144
Forelle						eating	160–190
Gellert see Beurré Hardy
Gem			West Virginia, US	cross made 1970, selected 1981, introduced 2014	Pick early September in West Virginia and Oregon.	eating	
General Leclerc			Angers, France	1950, introduced 1974	Parentage Doyenne du Comice x ?	Eating -0.5 °C 150 days	
Gerburg							
Giffard se Beurré Giffard
Glou Morceau	Beurré d'Hardenpoint Beurré d'Arenberg, Hardenponts Winterbutterbirne		Belgium	1750	Use November – December.	eating -0.5 °C 120 days	170–200
Gourmet			South Dakota, US	cross made 1954, selected 1969	Width 56–74 mm. Flesh: firm, yellow, crisp, juicy. Pollen-sterile Pick 3rd week in September in South Dakota.	eating	
Golden Spice					Small fruit, very hardy		
Gorham			New York, US	Introduced 1923	Parentage Bartlett x Josephine de Malines. AGM in 2006. Ripens 14 days later than Bartlett		
Grand Champion			Oregon, US	1936	Bud mutation from Gorham		
Grüne Jagdbirne			Germany ?	<1936	Pick late October.	Perry	
Hardy see Beurré Hardy
Harobig							
Harovin Sundown							
Harrow Crisp							
Harrow Delight			Ontario, Canada	Introduced 1982	Hardy in zone 5		
Harrow Gold							
Harrow Red							
Harrow Sweet			Ontario, Canada	cross made 1965			F1
Harvest Queen			Ontario, Canada	introduced 1982	Parentage: Williams x(Williams x(Williams x Seckel))	Eating, Canning	
Hermann							
Herzogin Elsa	Elsa		Germany	1879 or 1885	Pick late September	eating	
Hessle	Hazel		Yorkshire, England	<1827	disease resistant pear for organic gardening	eating	
Highland			US	cross made 1944	Parentage Willams x Doyenné du Comise	eating	
Honeysweet			US	cross made 1955, selected 1969	Width 55–61 mm, height 61–67 mm. Parentage Seckel x (Vermont Beauty x Roi Carlo de Wurtenberg). Pick early september. Flesh: buttery, sweet, rich.	eating	
Hortensia			Dresden-Pillnitz, Germany	introduced 1996	Parentage Nordhäuser Winterforelle x Clapp Favorite. Pick mid to late September.	eating	
Hosui (豊水) (Pyrus pyrifolia subsp. culta)	'Russet pears', Russet apple pear		National Institute of Fruit Tree Science, Japan	c. 1972		Cider, cooking, eating	135–145
Huntington							
Ingeborg			Balsgård, Fjälkestad, Sweden	1994	Parentage Conference x Bonne Louise. Triploid. Main pear cultivar in Norway	eating	
Isolda					Susceptible to fireblight	eating	F2
Jargonell	Bellissme-Jargonelle, Figue d'Été, Grosse-Jargonelle, Sabine d'Été, Vermillon d'Été		France	<1690	Tree is hardy, healthy and vigouros	eating	
Jeanne d'Arc			Rouen, France	introduced 1893	Parentage Diels Butterbirne x Doyenne du Comice	eating	
Joséphine de Malines	Josephine von Mecheln		, Mechelen(a.k.a. Malines), Belgium	1830	FCC in 1901. AGM in 1993. Obtained by Esperen, pomologist and mayor of Malines in the 19th century; one of the best late season pears. Pick late October. Use January – March.	eating -0.5 °C 120 days	
Kaiser Alexander see Bosc
Kalle see Starkrimson
Kieffer			United States		a hybrid of the Chinese "sand pear", P. pyrifolia and probably 'Bartlett'. Hardy in Zones 4–9.	eating, canning, baking	170–190
Kikusui	Kikisui				Pyrus pyrifolia. Not suitable for shipping.	eating	
Kosui (幸水)	Russet apple pear		National Institute of Fruit Tree Science, Japan	c. 1959	the most important cultivar in Japan), ('Russet pears')Pyrus pyrifolia subsp. culta	Cider, cooking, eating	120–130
La France			Vienne, Isere, France	1864			
Lategale							
Laxton's Superb			England	Raised 1901, Introduced 1913, Introduced in US 1937	Parentage Beurré Superfin x Bartlett. No longer used due to high susceptibility to fireblight		
Le Conte					Pyrus communis x P. pyrifolia.Vigorous tree.		
Liegel	Liegels Winterbutterbirne		Malines, Belgium	1788			
Louise Bonne	Bonne Louise d'Avranches, Louise Bonne d'Avranches, Bonne Louise of Jersey, Gute Louise von Avranches		Normandy, France	1778	Scab susceptible	eating -0.5 °C 120 days	141
Luscious			South Dakota, US	Introduced 1967	Small-medium Bartlett-like fruit. Hardy in Zone 4	eating	
Magness			Maryland, US	Introduced 1960	Hardy in Zone 6–9. Resistant to fire blight.		
Maxine			Ohio, US	Introduced 1923	Hardy in zones 4–8.		
Merton Pride			England	1941			
Moonglow				Introduced 1960	Parentage Doyenne du Comice x ? Hardy in zones 5–8.	eating, canning	
Moorcroft	Stinking Bishop		Colwall, England	<1884	Pick mid to late September	Perry	
Chinese White Pear (Pyrus bretschneideri)	Nashi						
Nashi	Asian / Japanese / Chinese / Korean / Taiwanese / sand pear				Pyrus pyrifolia		
Nijisseiki (二十世紀) name means "20th century", also spelled 'Nijusseiki'	Green pears		Matsudo, Chiba, Japan	c. 1888	Green apple pear. (Pyrus pyrifolia subsp. culta)	Cider, cooking, eating	140–155
Nordhäuser Winterforelle			Nordhausen, Germany	introduced 1864	Pick mid-October. Use January – March	eating -0.5 °C 120 days	
Oberösterreichische Weinbirne			Austria	old	Pick mid-October	Perry	
Oldfield			Herefordshire, England	early 1700s	Pick mid to late October. Mill 3–6 weeks after harvest.	Perry	
Onward			National Fruit Trials in Wisley, Surrey	1947	Laxton's Superb x Doyenne du Comice	Eating	
Orcas			Washington, US	1966	Cold storage 11 weeks		112–132
Orient			United States		an interspecific P. communis × P. pyrifolia hybrid. Hardy in zones 5–8.	canning	
Packham	'Packham's Triumph'		Australia	1896	Parentage Uvedale's St. Germain x Williams.	eating -0.5 °C 90 days	150–165 F4
Paragon			Oregon, US	cross made in 1940s	Flesh fine-textured with exquisite flavor. Tree vigorous.	eating	
Parker			Minnesota, US		Large Bartlett-like fruit		
Paris see Comtesse de Paris
Parsonage			New Rochelle, New York	c. 1857			
Passe Crassane			Rouen, France	1855	A variety developed by M. Boisbunel, a nurseryman from Rouen, France	Eating -0.5 °C 150 days	180–210 F4
Patten			Iowa, US		Hardy to -50 degrees F. Large tender and juicy fruit.	Eating, canning	
Petersbirne	Grosse Petersbirne		Germany	<1799		Cooking, juice, drying. -0.5 °C 30 days	
Piérre Corneille			France	<1895	Biennial bearing.	eating	
Pineapple			United States		an interspecific P. communis × P. pyrifolia hybrid. Hardy in zone 8–9	eating, canning	
Pitmaston	Pitmaston Duchess, Williams' Duchess		Worcester, England	1841	FCC in 1874	eating, canning	
Poire de Curé	Curé, Bon Curé, Vicar of Winkfield, Pastorenbirne		Indre, France	1760	Triploid. Pick October. Use December–January	eating, cooking, 0 C 130 days	
Potomac			US	cross made 1961	Parentage Moonglow x Beurrè d' Anjou. Width 65 mm. Pick 2 week after Bartlett. Flesh: buttery, reminding Beurré d'Anjou	eating	
President Drouard	Präsident Drouard		Angers, France	Introduced 1870	Pick mid-October. Use November–January	eating	
Prècoce de Trévoux			France	1862	Scab susceptible.	eating -0.5 °C 50 days	105
Precoce Moretini see Butirra Precoce Morettini	Early Moretini variety						
Red Clapp's see Starkrimson
Rescue			Vancouver, B.C.	<1976	Width 75–85 mm. Pick 6 days before Bartlett. Flesh: cream-colored, melting, juicy, reminding Clapp's Favorite.	eating, 1 °C, 12 weeks	
Rocha	Pêra Rocha		Portugal			eating, 0 C 210 days	
Robert de Neufville			Geisenheim, Germany	cross made 1896	Parentage: Auguste Jurie x Clapp's Favourite. Pick late August. Flavour comparable with Doyenné du Comice	eating	
Rosemarie			South Africa	cross made 1974	Parentage Bon Rouge x Forelle		
Santa Maria			Italy	introduced 1951	Parentage Williams x Coscia	eating	
Schweizer Wasserbirne			Switzerland ?	old	Triploid. Juice yield 75–80%	juice, drying	
Seckel	Seckle		United States, Philadelphia area	late 17th century	Some fireblight resistance. Hardy in zone 5–8.	eating	120–140
Shenandoah			Kearneysville, West Virginia, US	selected 1985, introduced 2003	Harvest maturity similar to Beurre d' Anjou	eating	
Shinseki					Hardy in zone 6–9.	eating	125–135
Starkrimson	Kalle, Red Clapp's		Michigan	Discovered 1939, Introduced 1956	a red-skinned bud mutation of Clapp's Favourite. Its thick, smooth skin is a uniform, bright and intense red, and its creamy flesh is sweet and aromatic.		
Stinking Bishop see Moorcroft							
Siberian					Extremely hardy with inedible fruit, used as a pollinator		
Summer Beauty							
Summercrisp			Minnesota, US	Introduced 1987	Cold storage 6 weeks. Crisp texture is similar to Asian Pears, medium sized mildly sweet fruit		
Sweet Sensation	Rode Doyenné van Doorn		Netherlands	discovered 1992, introduced 2010	mutation of Doyenne du Comice	eating	
Taylor's gold			New Zealand		a russeted mutant clone of 'Comice'		
Tongeren, Tongern, Tongre see Beurré Durandeau
Tosca							
Trévoux see Prècoce de Trévoux
Triomphe de Vienne	Triumph		Isère, France	introduced 1874	Biennial bearing.	eating	156
Tsu Li	Tse Li				Pyrus pyrifolia	eating	150–165
Turandot			Italy	cross made 1980, introduced 2000	Parentage Dr. Guyot x Bella di Giugno. Susceptible to fire blight.	eating	
Tyson	Early Sugar Pear		Philadelphia, US	1794	Tree is hardy and fireblight reistant. Hardy in zone 5–8. Pick early August.	eating	
Ure			Morden, Manitoba		Juicy, small-medium fruit		
Uta			Dresden-Pillnitz, Germany	1993	Parentage Madame Verte x Beurré Bosc. Pick mid-October	eating, ? °C 135 days	
Verdi			Wageningen, Netherlands	1966			
Vicar of Winkfield see Poire de Curé
Virgouleuse							
Warren			Mississippi, United States	1976	Resistant to fireblight.	eating	
Williams	Williams Christ, Williams' Bon Chrétien; Bartlett (United States); Red Bartlett (United States)		Berkshire, England	1770	Susceptible to scab and fireblight. Many are yellow. There are three major red-skinned mutant clones: 'Max Red Bartlett', 'Sensation Red Bartlett', 'Rosired Bartlett' Good for eating, baking, cooking. In a recipe specifying apples, substituting one of these pears can give joy.	eating, canning -1 °C 60 days	115–135 F3
Windsor	Pyrus communis 'Windsor,' Pyrum Windsorianum, Summer Bell		England	c. 1563	An old English cultivar, susceptible to scab. Yellow skin, prone to developing red and orange streaks. Pick from late July to August.	Eating and cooking	~100
Winter Nelis	Bonne de Malines, Beurré de Malines, Coloma d' Hiver, Nélis d'Hiver,		Malines, Belgium	<1818	FCC in 1902. Resistant to fireblight.	Eating -1 °C 120 days	160–185
Xenia	Noiabriskaia, Nojabrskaja		Netherlands	cross made 1968, selected 2001, introduced 2008	Parentage Triomphe de Vienne x Nicolai Krier. Pick 2 weeks after Conerence.	eating, 1 °C 90 days.	
Ya Li					Pyrus pyrifolia	eating	150–165
Yakumo					Pyrus pyrifolia	eating	

== Perry pears ==
Perry pears may be far too sour or bitter for fresh eating, but are used for making perry, the pear equivalent of the alcoholic beverage apple cider. Some pears (especially older ones from the U.S. and Canada) are used for both cider and eating purposes.

== Gallery ==
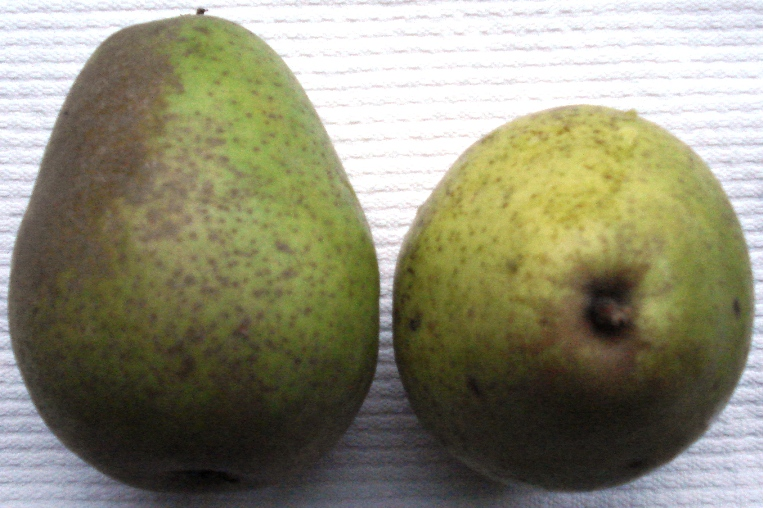
Alexander Lukas

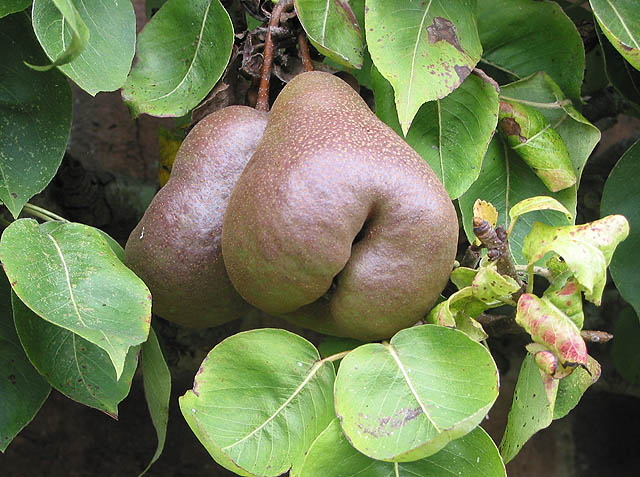
Black Worcester

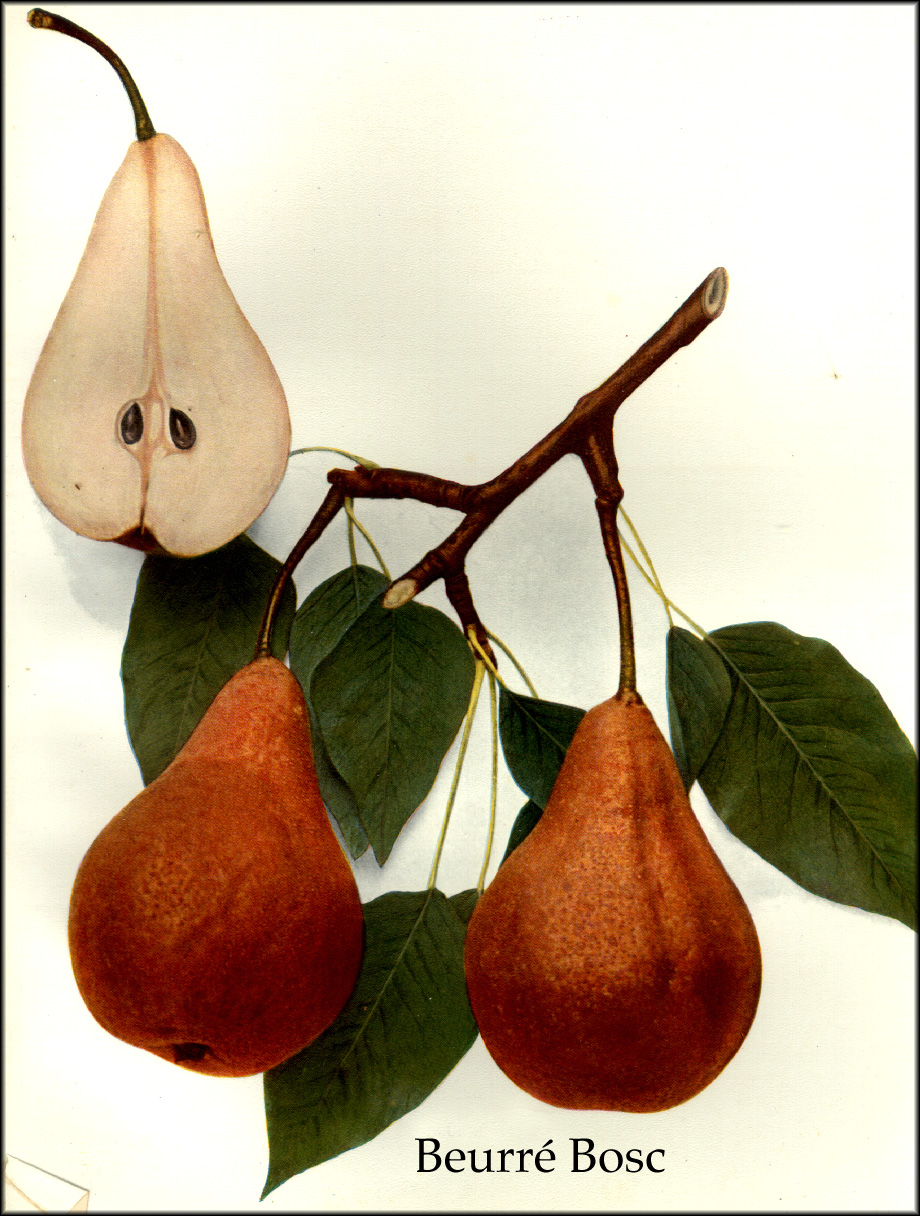
Bosc

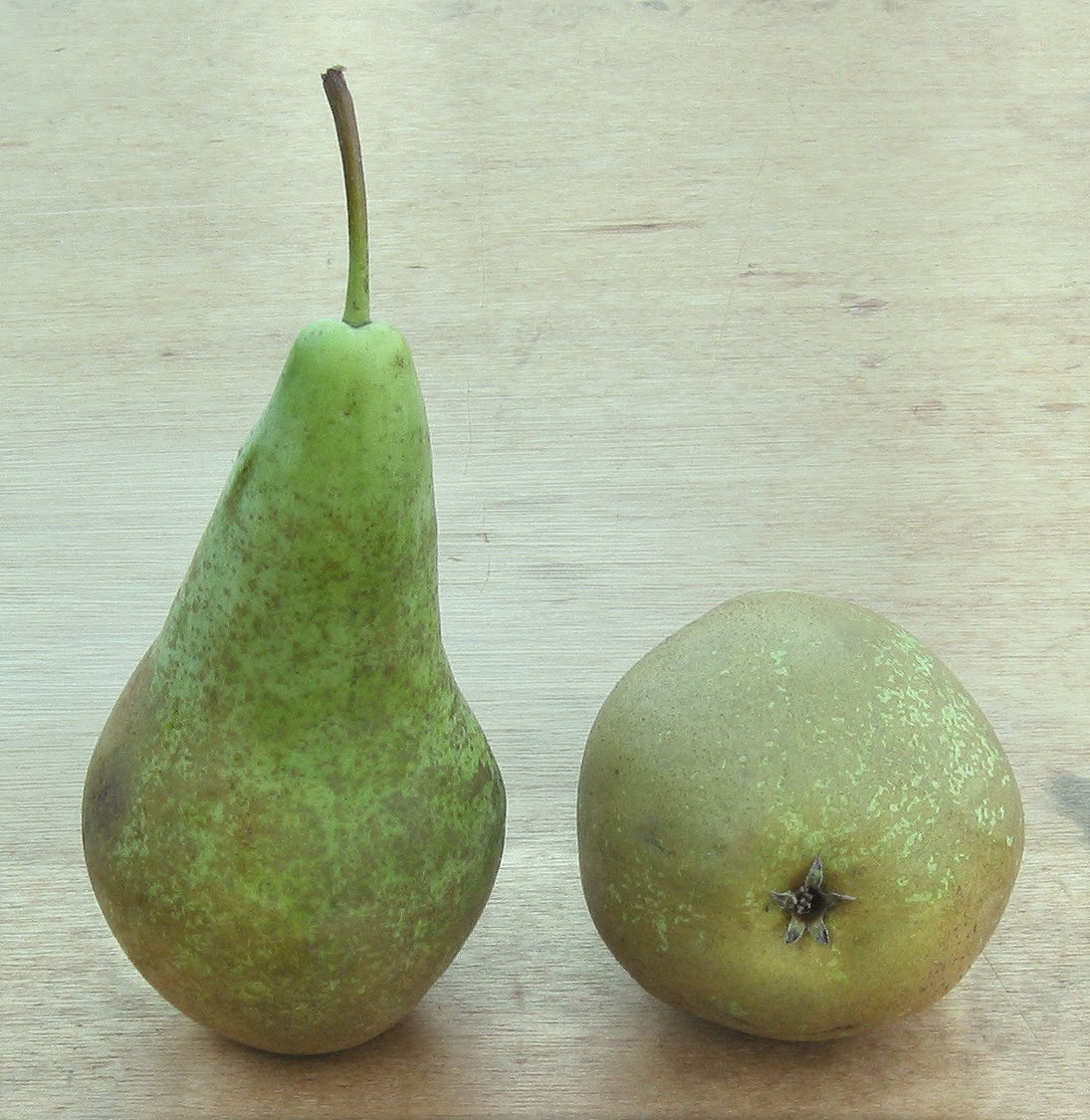
Conference

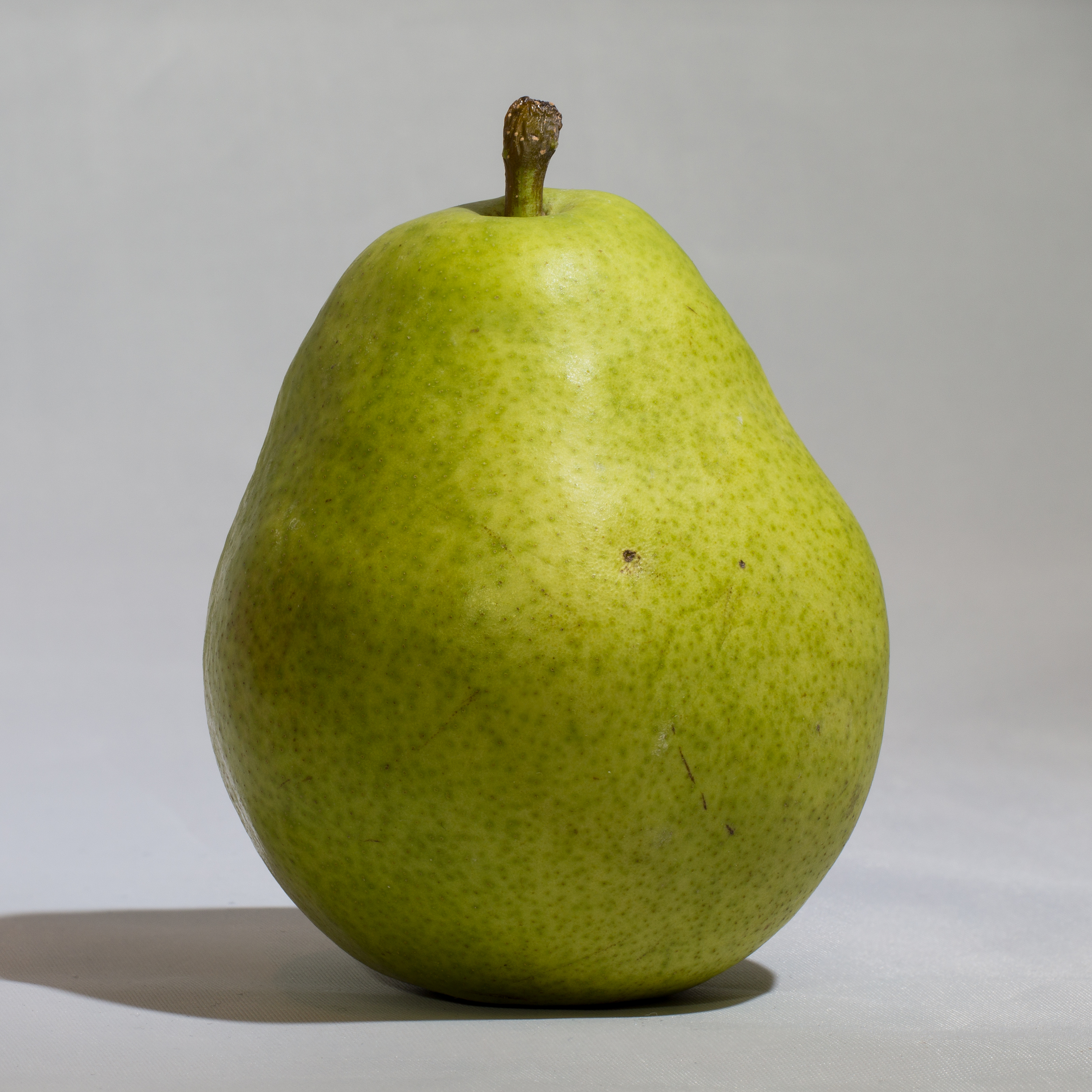
Beurré D'Anjou

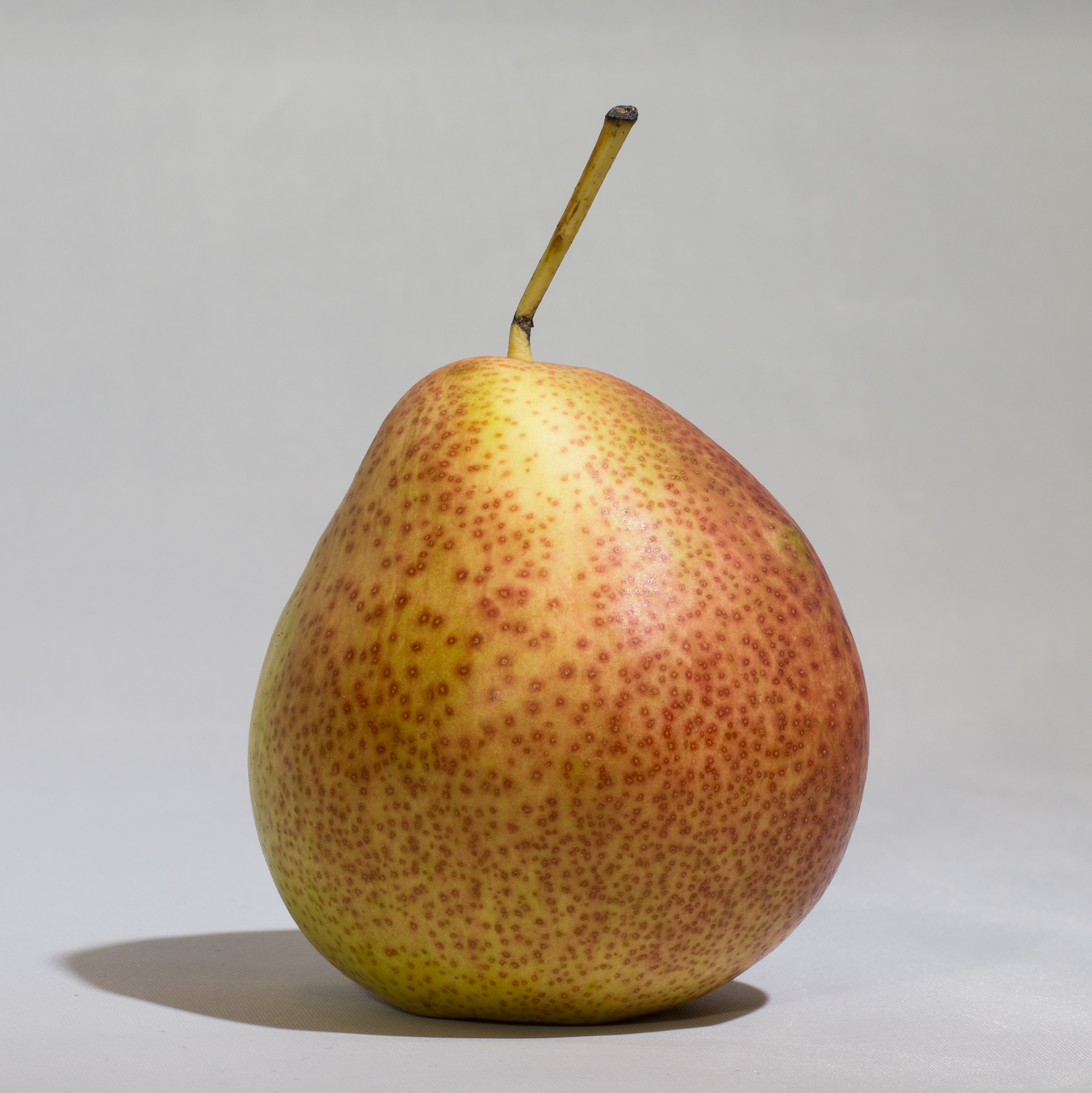
Forelle

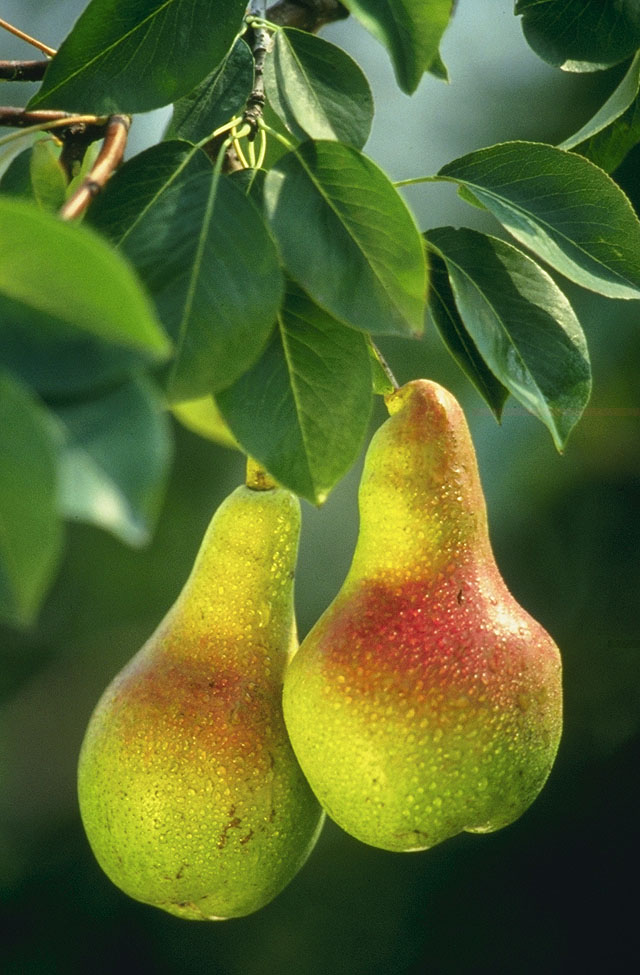
European Pear

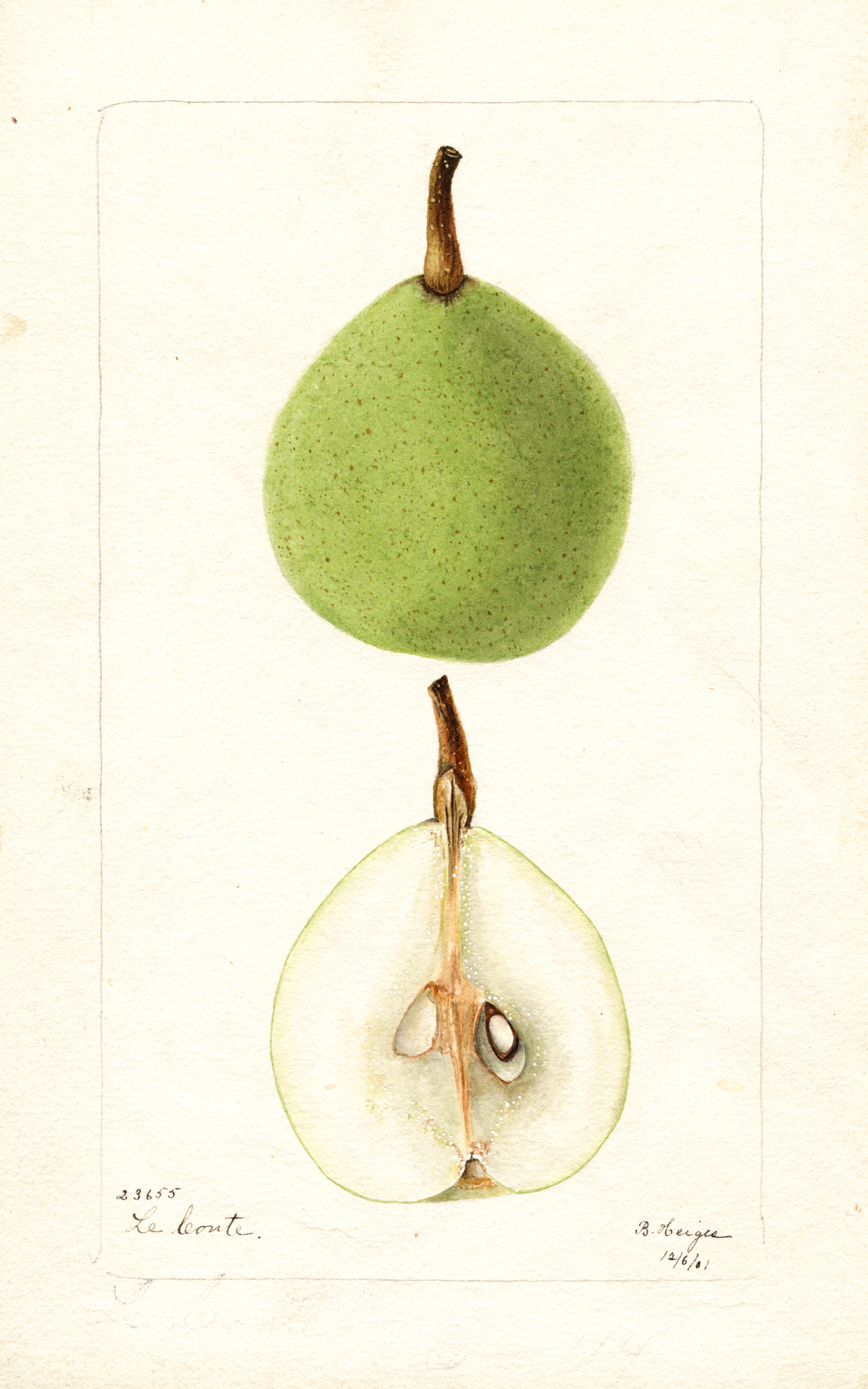
Le Conte

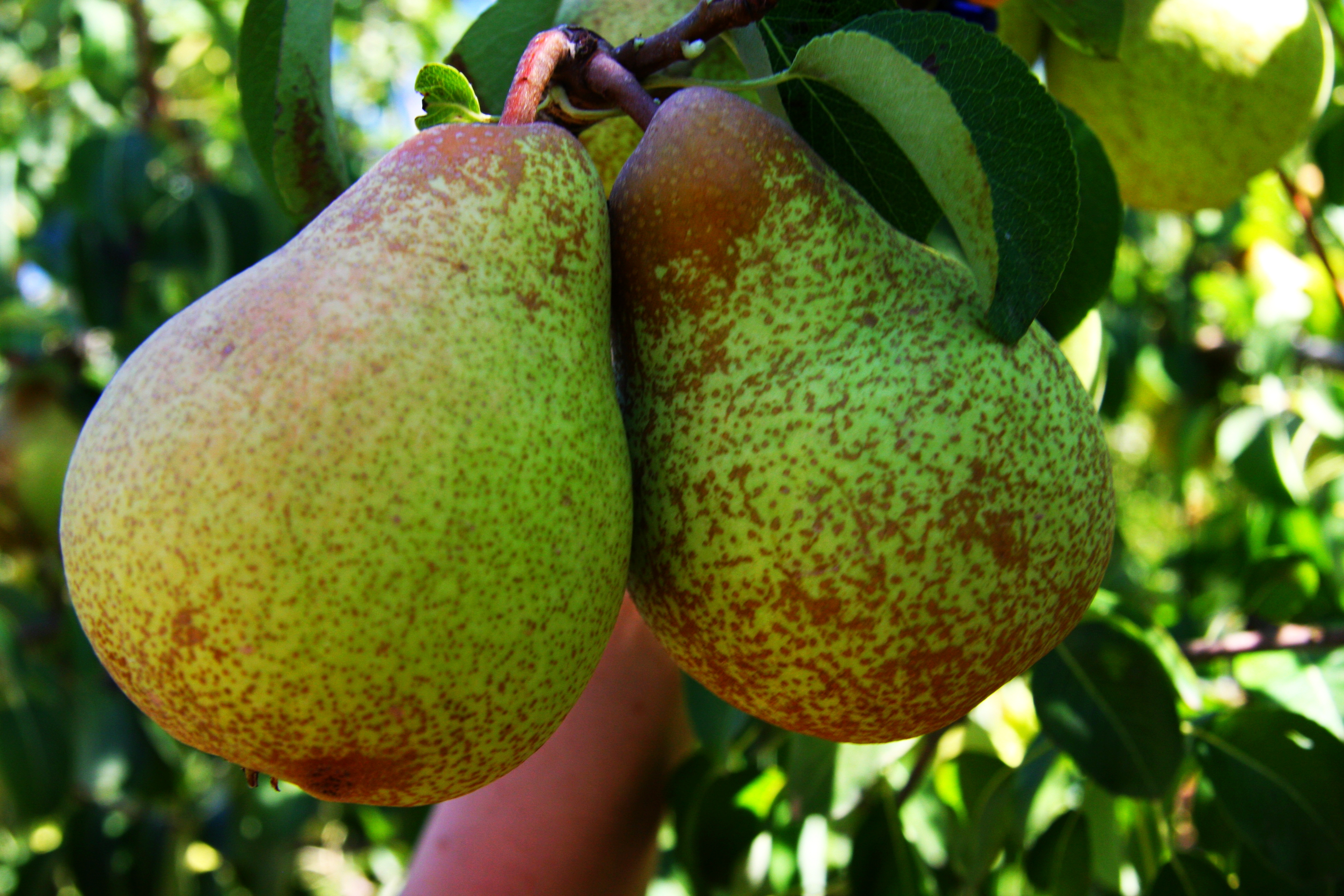
Pêra Rocha

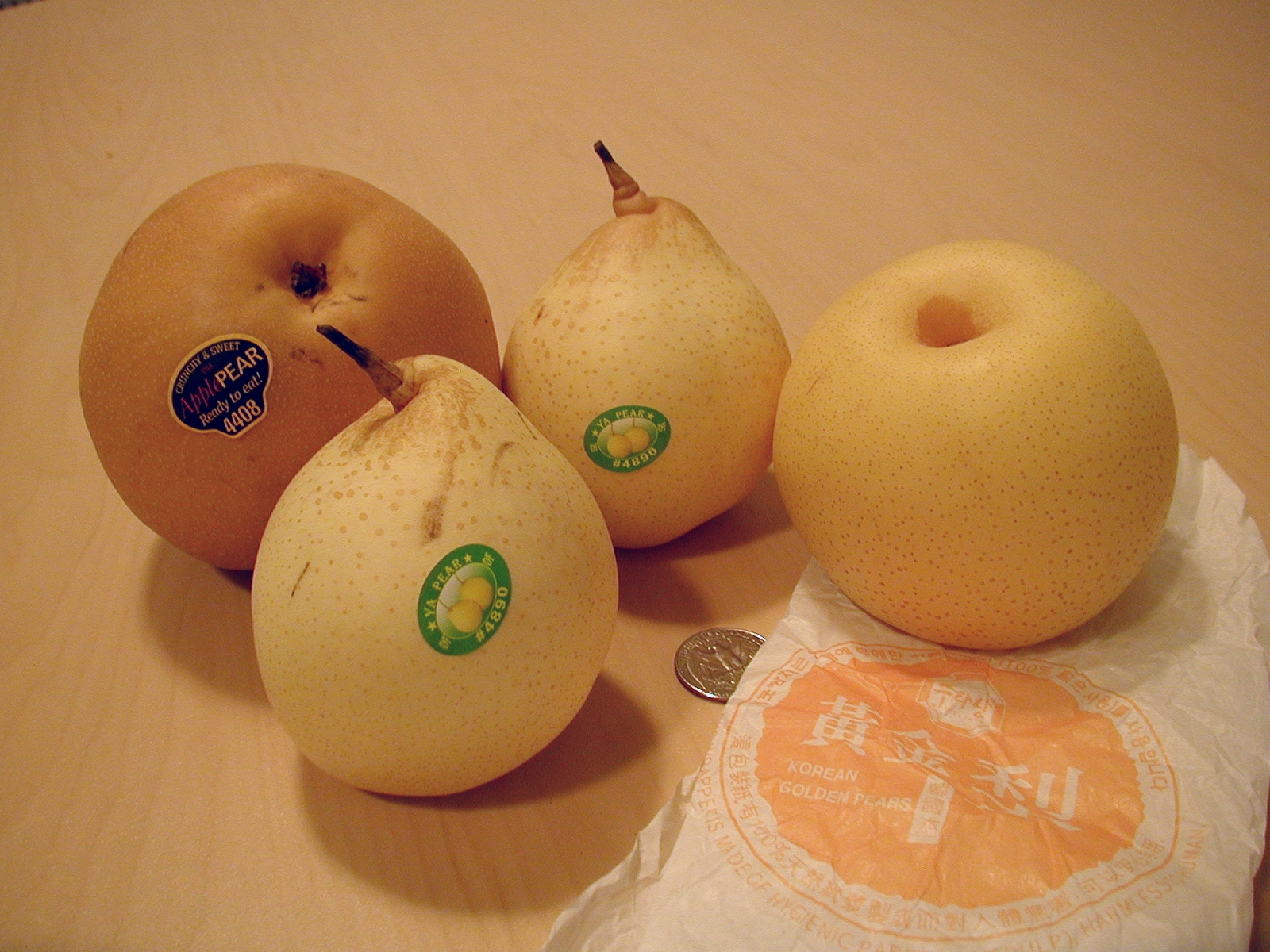
Pyrus pyrifolia

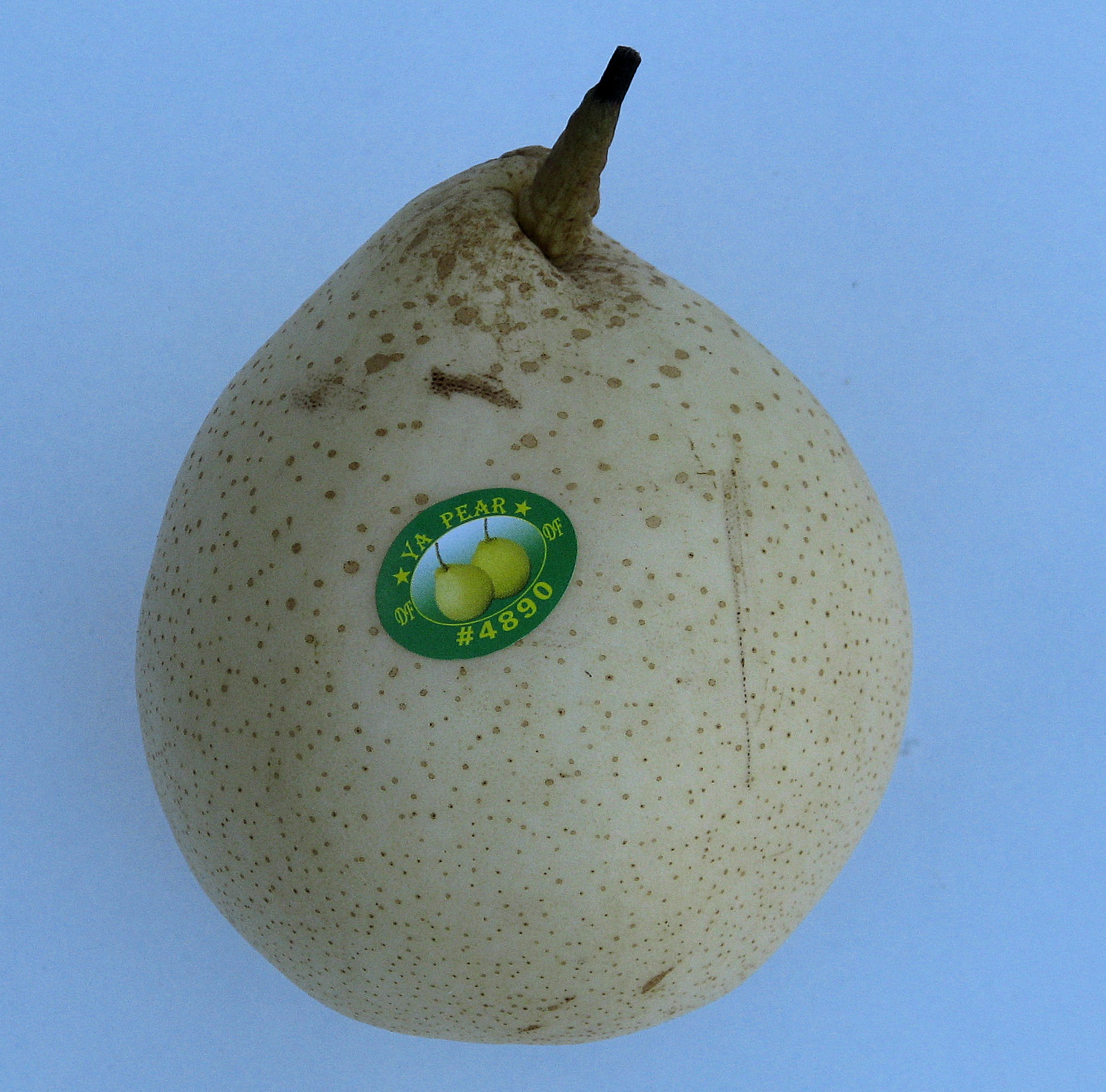
Pyrus bretschneideri

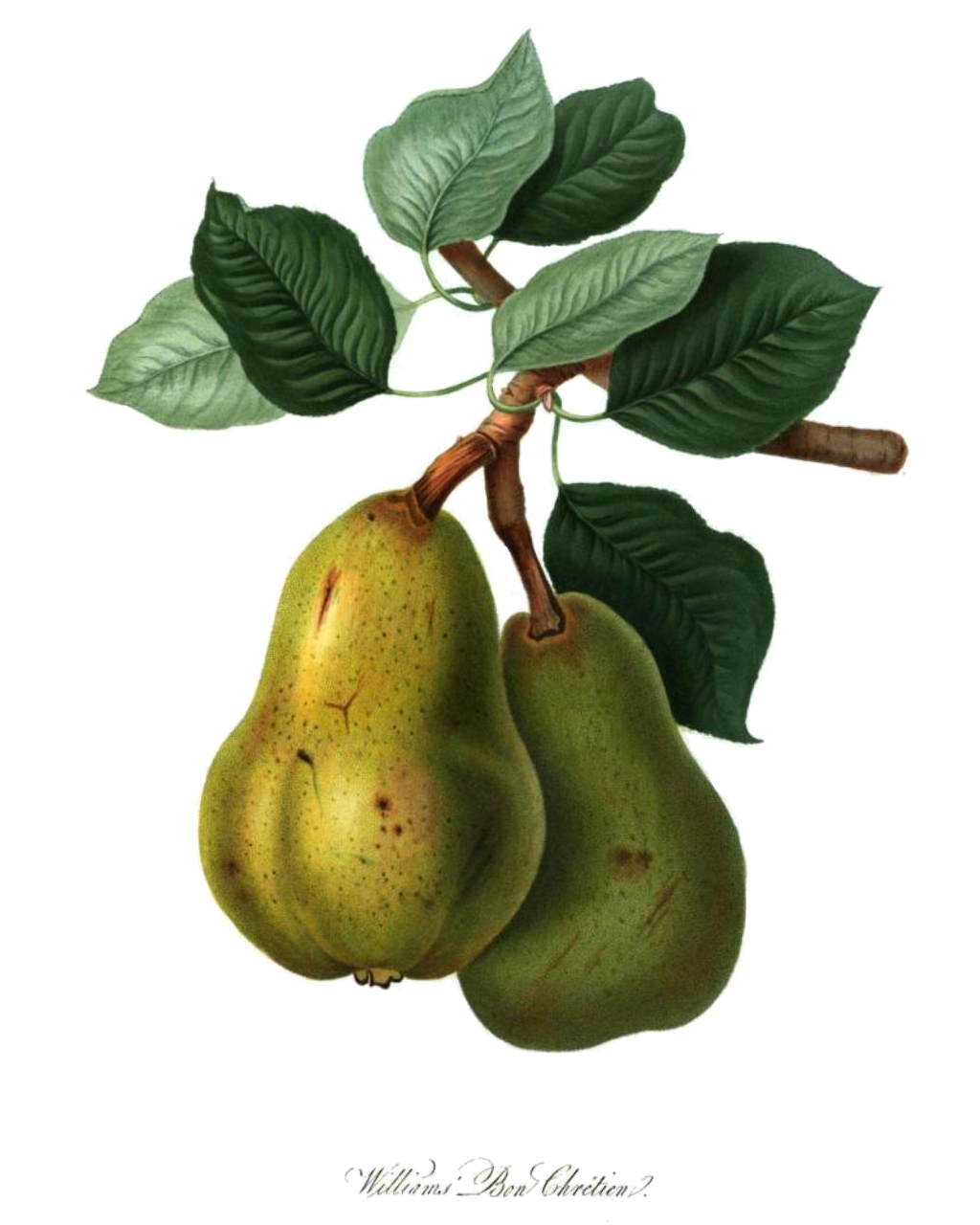
Williams (Bartlett)

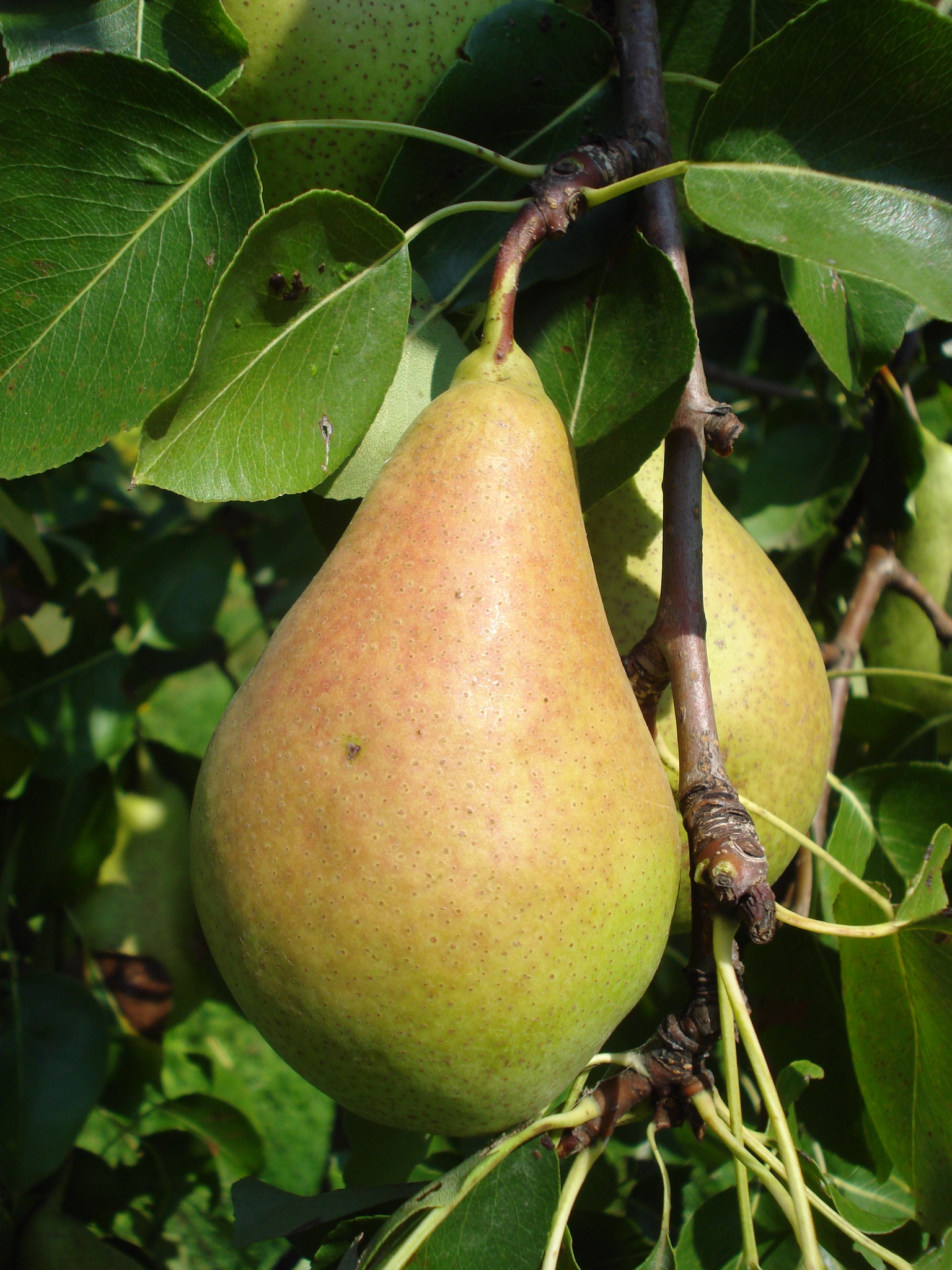
Vicar of Winkfield (Poire de Curé)
