= Williams pear =

Pear cultivar

'Williams' pear
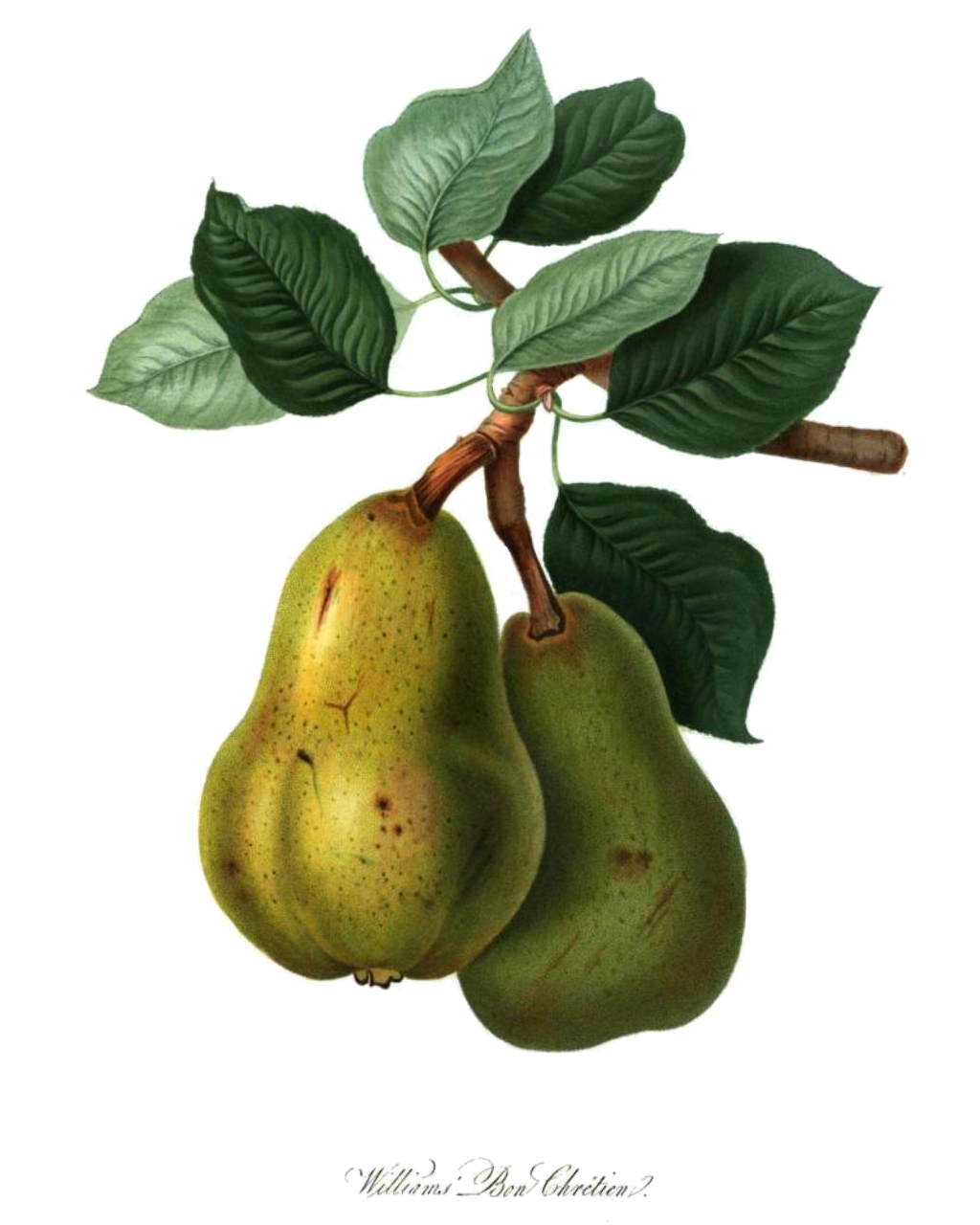
- The Williams pear. An 1822 print from the Horticultural Society of London
- Genus: Pyrus
- Species: Pyrus communis
- Cultivar: 'Williams'
- Origin: Aldermaston, UK between 1765 and 1770

The Williams' bon chrétien pear, commonly called the Williams pear, or the Bartlett pear in the United States and Canada, is a cultivar (cultivated variety) of the species Pyrus communis, commonly known as the European pear. The fruit has a bell shape, considered the traditional pear shape in the west, and its green skin turns yellow upon later ripening, although red-skinned derivative varieties exist. It is considered a summer pear, not as tolerant of cold as some varieties. It is often eaten raw, but holds its shape well when baked, and is a common choice for canned or other processed pear uses.

== History ==
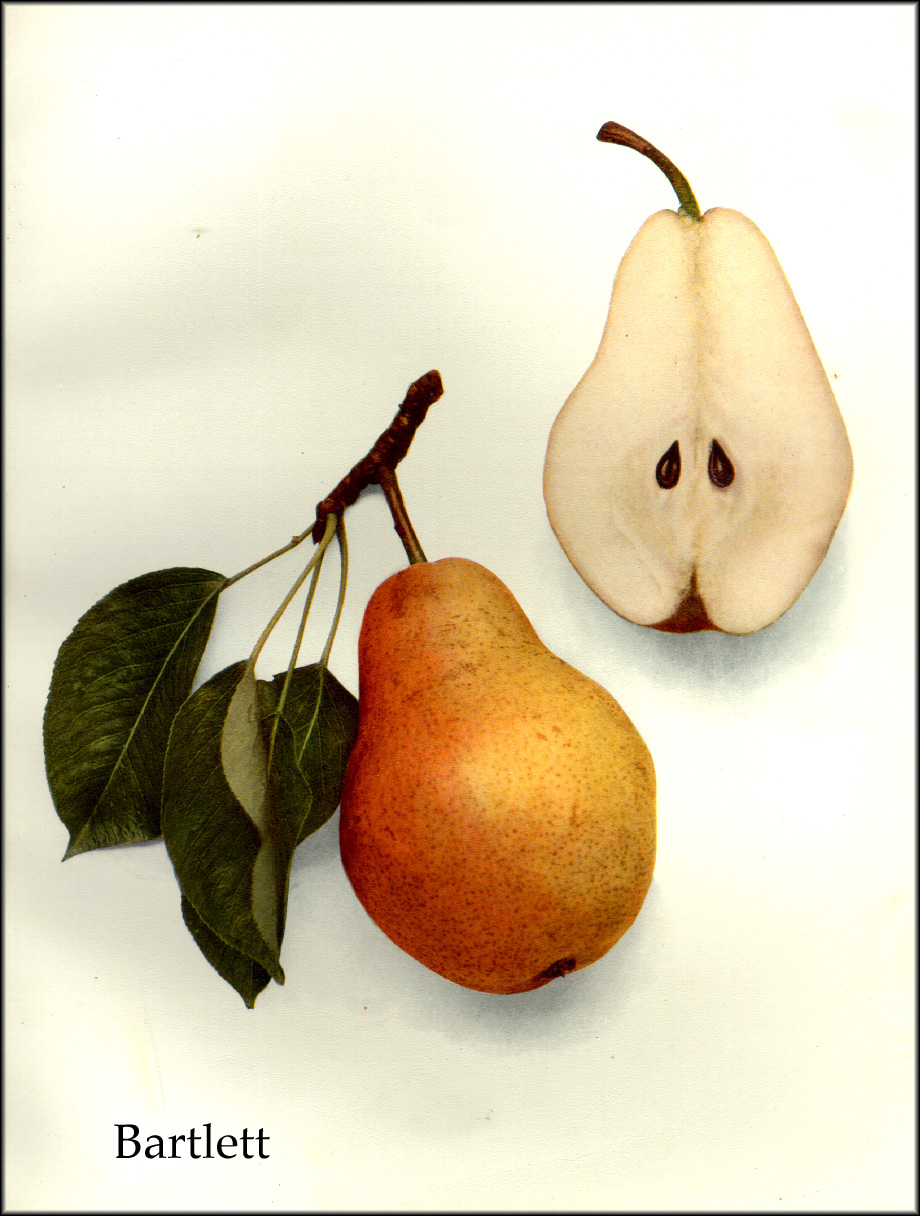
Bartlett pear, from The Pears of New York (1921) by Ulysses Prentiss Hedrick

The origins of this variety are uncertain. "Bon Chrétien" (Good Christian) is named after Francis of Paola, a holy man whom King Louis XI of France had called to his deathbed as a healer in 1483. Francis offered the king a pear seed from his native Calabria with instructions to plant and care. Hence the pear tree was called "Good Christian". The Williams pear is thought to date from 1765 to 1770 from the yard of an Aldermaston, England, schoolmaster named John Stair, giving rise to the now-obscure synonyms 'Aldermaston' pear and 'Stairs' pear. A nurseryman named Williams later acquired the variety, and after introducing it to the rest of England, the pear became known as the Williams Pear. However, the pear's full name is Williams' Bon Chretien, or "Williams' good Christian."

In 1799 James Carter imported several Williams trees into the United States, and they were planted on the grounds of Thomas Brewer in Roxbury, Massachusetts. The Massachusetts estate was later acquired by Enoch Bartlett of Dorchester, Massachusetts. Unaware of their origin, Bartlett named the pears after himself and introduced the variety into the United States. It was not realised that Bartlett and Williams Pears were the same until 1828, when new trees arrived from Europe. By that time the Bartlett variety had become vastly popular in the United States, and they are still generally known as Bartlett pears in the US and Canada, although there are about 150 other synonyms worldwide.

== Physical description ==
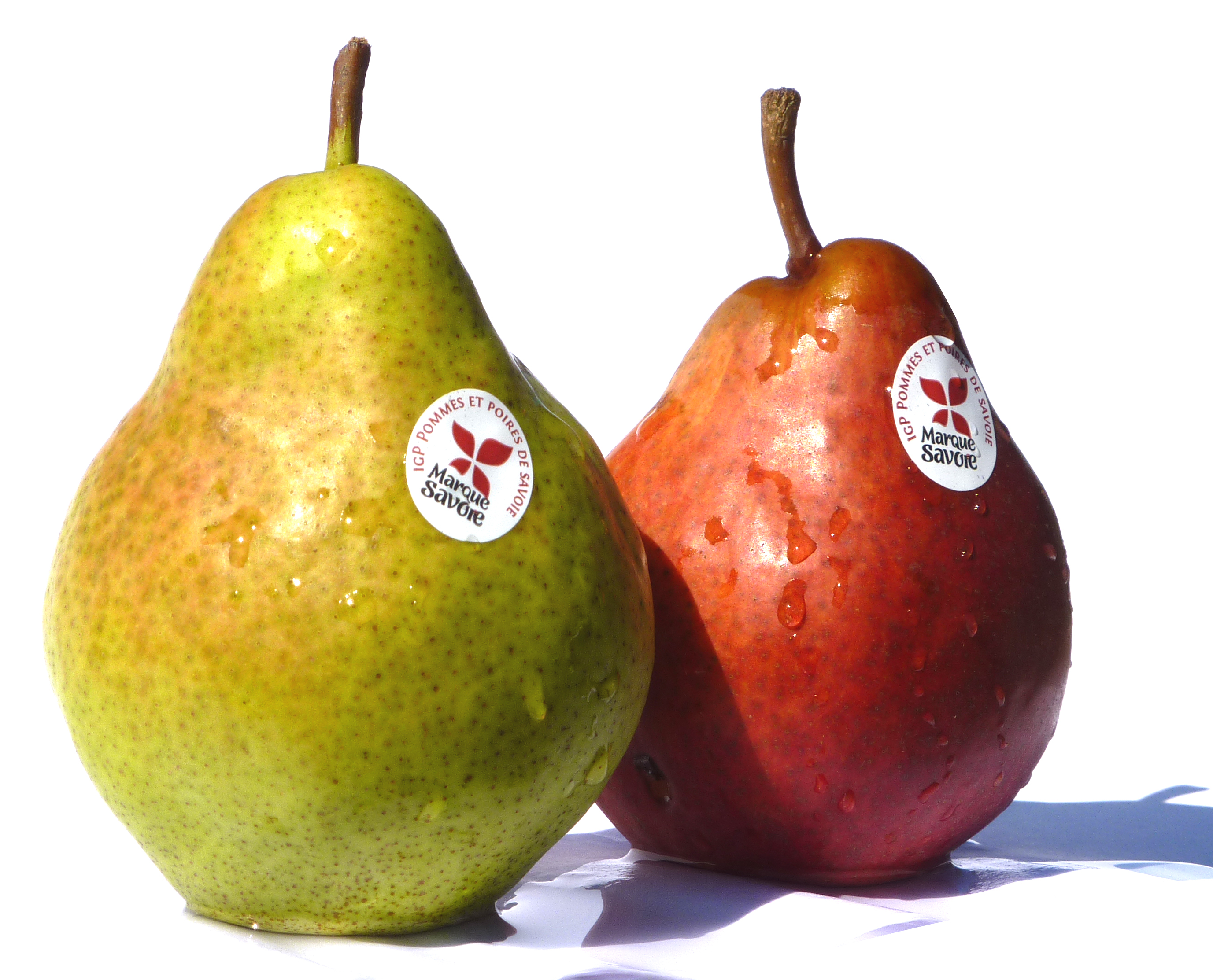
French red and green varieties

The pear exhibits a pyriform "pear shape," with a rounded bell on the bottom half of the fruit, and then a definite shoulder with a smaller neck or stem end. Williams are aromatic pears, and have what some consider the definitive "pear flavour". Colours of the pear vary from green (when unripe), to yellow (ripe) and red. Red Bartletts or Williams are similar to the traditional Williams, aside from ripening to a reddish colour rather than a yellow colour. Red-skinned mutant clones (i.e. "sports") of the Williams are increasing in popularity, including three major varieties in the US: the Max Red Bartlett, the Sensation Red Bartlett, and the Rosired Bartlett. One study of several macrosatellite loci in 63 European Pear (Pyrus communis L.) cultivars did not distinguish Max Red Bartlett and Sensation Red Bartlett from the standard Williams, which was expected since the red mutants were derived from the Williams by mutation. Dozens of other cultivars and hybrids have been created from Williams, created for properties like cold resistance, ripening time, skin colouration, and grafting compatibility.

Best when picked with the internal pressure of the pear is between 110 and 120 kPa (16 and 18 psi), the pear should still be green and relatively hard when picked. Optimum conditions for ripening are in dry shady areas, and ripening usually takes 7 to 10 days from when the pear was picked. As the pear ripens the color will slowly change to a soft yellow and the pear will soften. Commercially produced pears are normally picked and shipped to the stores while green.

== Tree ==
Pear trees are usually productive for 50 to 75 years though some still produce fruit after 100 years. A Bon Chrétien tree planted around 1630 in Danvers, Massachusetts is still producing fruit today.

Height: 4.5–6 m (15–20 ft) with slightly less spread
Flowers: White flowers grouped in a corymb
Blooming time: April–May (in the Northern Hemisphere)
Fruit and seeds: Large, golden yellow skin, brownish red blush, classic shape with smooth, white flesh. Harvest from mid-August to mid-September (Northern Hemisphere).
Leaves: The leaves are simple, glossy green leaves that alternate on the twig. They grow up to 8 cm (3 in) long, are thick with slight midrib curves folding the edges inwards. They have fine teeth on the margin.
Elevation: 300–1,500 m (1,000–5,000 ft)
Habitat: Orchards and landscaping

== Production and uses ==
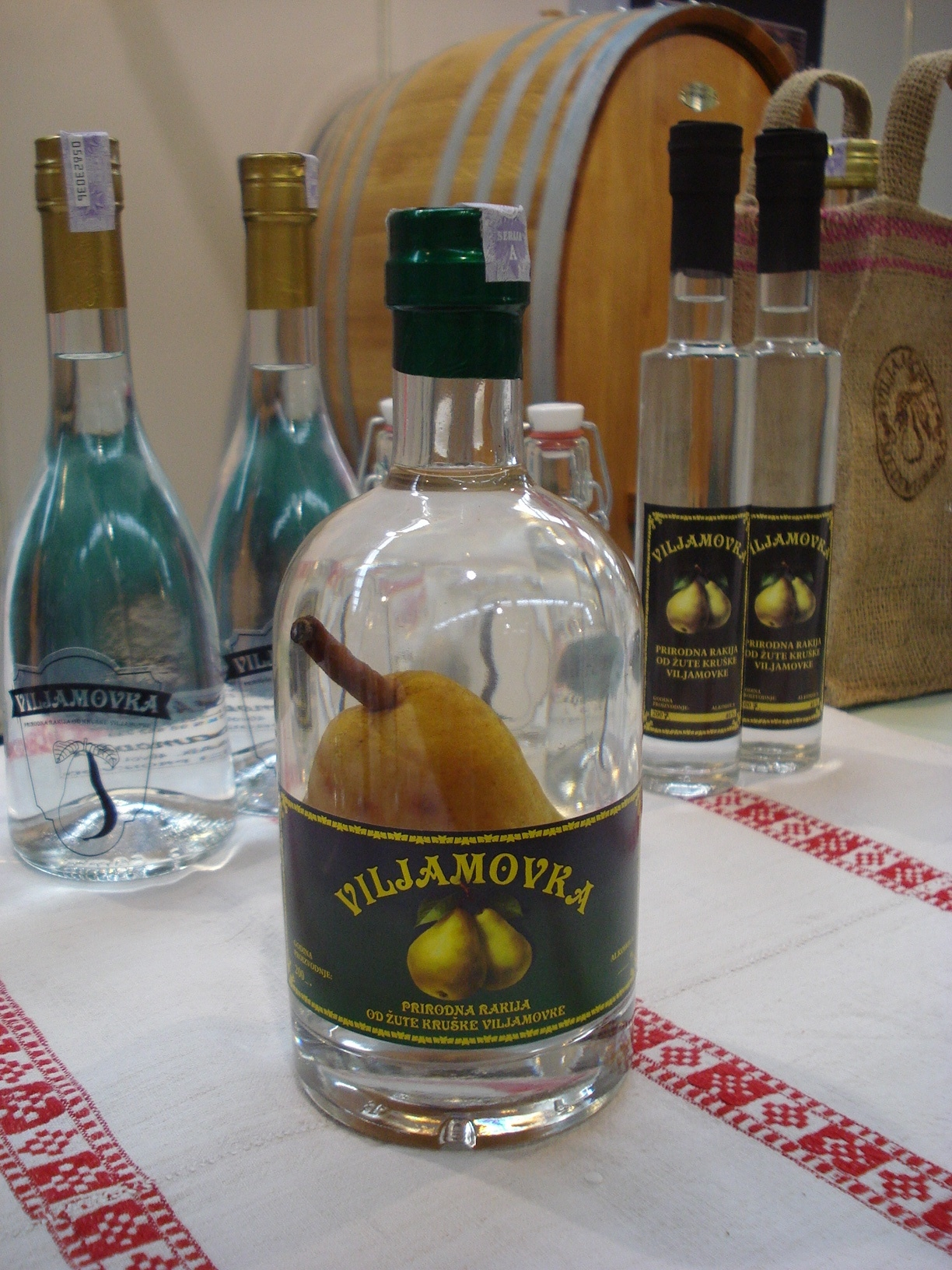
Brandy

=== US pear production ===
In 1985, this variety represented 80% of US pear production while in 2004 it represented 50% of reported pear production, displaced primarily by the continuing growth of d'Anjou and Bosc pears, both winter pears more tolerant of cold than the Bartlett.

While more pears are sold fresh in the US than processed, Bartlett pears are the primary choice for canned halves, puree, and most pear juice and nectar in the US, comprising about two-thirds of Bartlett production. Bartletts are traditionally known as the canning pear due to their "definitive flavor and sweetness," making them well-suited for multiple forms of processing.

==== Named mutants ====
List of some "sports" or mutants of the Williams pear.

Date	Originator/Country	Market Name	Mutated From	Assignee	Habit	Flavor	Texture	Color	Plant Patent Number
1908	/Canada	Russet Bartlett						Golden russet	
1924	Stephen G. Nye/ Oregon, US	Nye Russet Bartlett				more spicy	firmer	deep yellow with golden russet	
1940	/Australia	Sensation Red Bartlett							
1942	/US	Eller							
1945 Patented 1 Jul 1947	Moritz/US	Max-Red Bartlett	Bartlett	MacKelvie	standard	sweeter	finer	red	US plant patent 741
1948, Introduced 1963	James W. Sweeney/ California, US	Rosired Bartlett	Bartlett	Fowler Nurseries				Maroon red on picking-ripe fruit.	Plant patent 2012
27 Dec 1977	Crisafulli/ Montana, US		Bartlett		semi-dwarf	good		red blush	US plant patent 4169
14 Apr 1998	Biehn/ Oregon, US	Cinnamon	Bartlett		standard	sweeter		russet	US plant patent 10325
26 Feb 2008	David Lowry/US	Carolina Gold	Bartlett	Associated Fruit	standard	more tart		russet	US plant patent 18515

==== Offspring ====
For several decades, the Williams pear has been used actively as a parent in the production of new varieties:

Cross made/Introduced	Originator/Country	Marketed/Name	Parent	Other Parent	Plant Patent Number
1896	C.H. Packham / Australia	Packham (Packhams Triumph)	Bartlett	Uvedals St. Germain	
1901/1913	Laxton Brothers/Bedfordshire, England	Laxton´s Superb	Bartlett	Beurré Superfin	
1902/1927	Laxton Brothers/Bedfordshire, England	Laxton´s Satisfaction	Bartlett	Beurré Superfin	
?/?	Laxton Brothers/Bedfordshire, England	Laxton´s Progress	Bartlett	Marie Louise	
1920/?	England	Bristol Cross	Bartlett	Conference	
?/1923	US	Gorham	Bartlett	Josephine de Malines	
1931/1945	Robert Patterson/California, US	El Dorado	Bartlett	?	
1956	Italy	Butirra Precoce Morettini	Bartlett	Coscia	
?/1964	New York, US	Aurora	Bartlett	Marguerite Marillat	
?/1974	England	Beth	Bartlett	Beurré Superfin	
1944/1974	Robert C. Lamb/New York, US	Highland	Bartlett	Comice	
?/?	England	Merton Pride	Tetraploid Bartlett	Hardenpont	
?/?	Italy	Santa Maria	Bartlett	Coscia	
?/1974	F.C. Reimer/Oregon, US	Canal Red	Max Red Bartlett	Forelle	
1959/1975 Patented 27 Aug 1974	William H. Griggs/California, US	California	Max Red Bartlett^{741}	Comice	US plant patent 3599
1965/?	Canada	Harrow Sweet	Bartlett	Purdue 8051	
1974/1990	South Africa	Rosemary	Bon Rouge	Forelle	
1985/1997	S.H. Hjeltnes/Sweden, Norway	Celina(QTee)	Bartlett	Colorée de Juillet	
Patented 9 Aug 1988	Reimer/US	Reimer	Max Red Bartlett^{741}	Comice	US plant patent 6245
1977/2003	R.L. Bell/Kearneysville, US	Shenandoah	Max Red Bartlett	US 56 112	
Patented 30 Jan 2007	White/New Zealand	Prem2P	Max Red Bartlett^{741}	Nijisseiki	US plant patent 17387
Patented 17 Apr 2007	Hart/New Zealand	Prem1P	Max Red Bartlett^{741}	Nijisseiki	US plant patent 17624
2007/?	J.R. Breach/Great Britain	Misty Rose	Red Williams	Concorde	

=== Distilled spirits ===
The Williams pear is used in making both Poire Williams, an eau de vie (French fruit brandy), and Belle de Brillet, an infused cognac.

The pear is also popular in the western Balkans, where it is distilled into a brandy known as viljamovka, similar to Poire Williams but often with a higher alcohol percentage. Some producers of viljamovka include an entire pear inside each bottle. This is achieved by attaching the bottle to a budding pear tree so that the pear will grow inside it.
