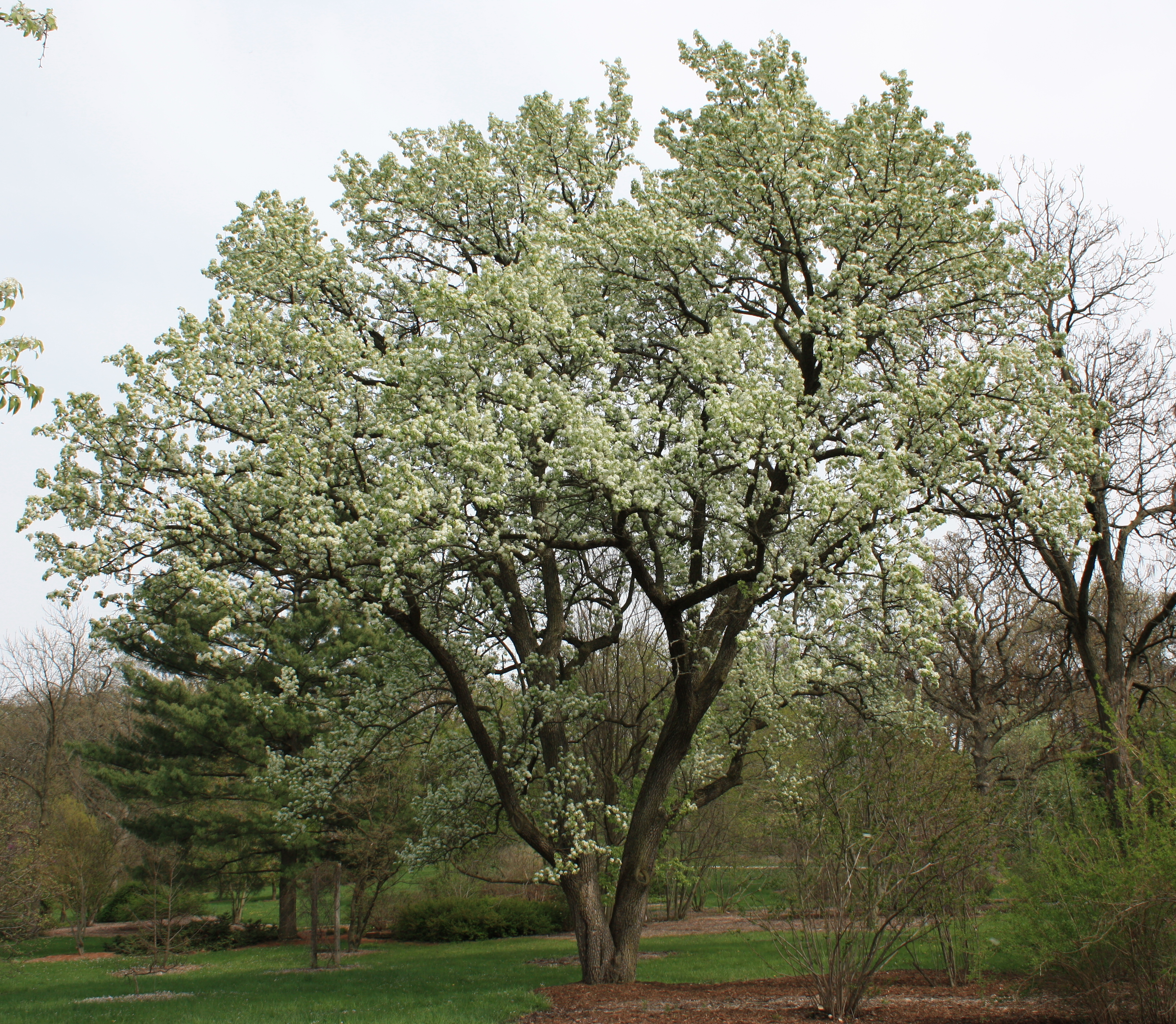

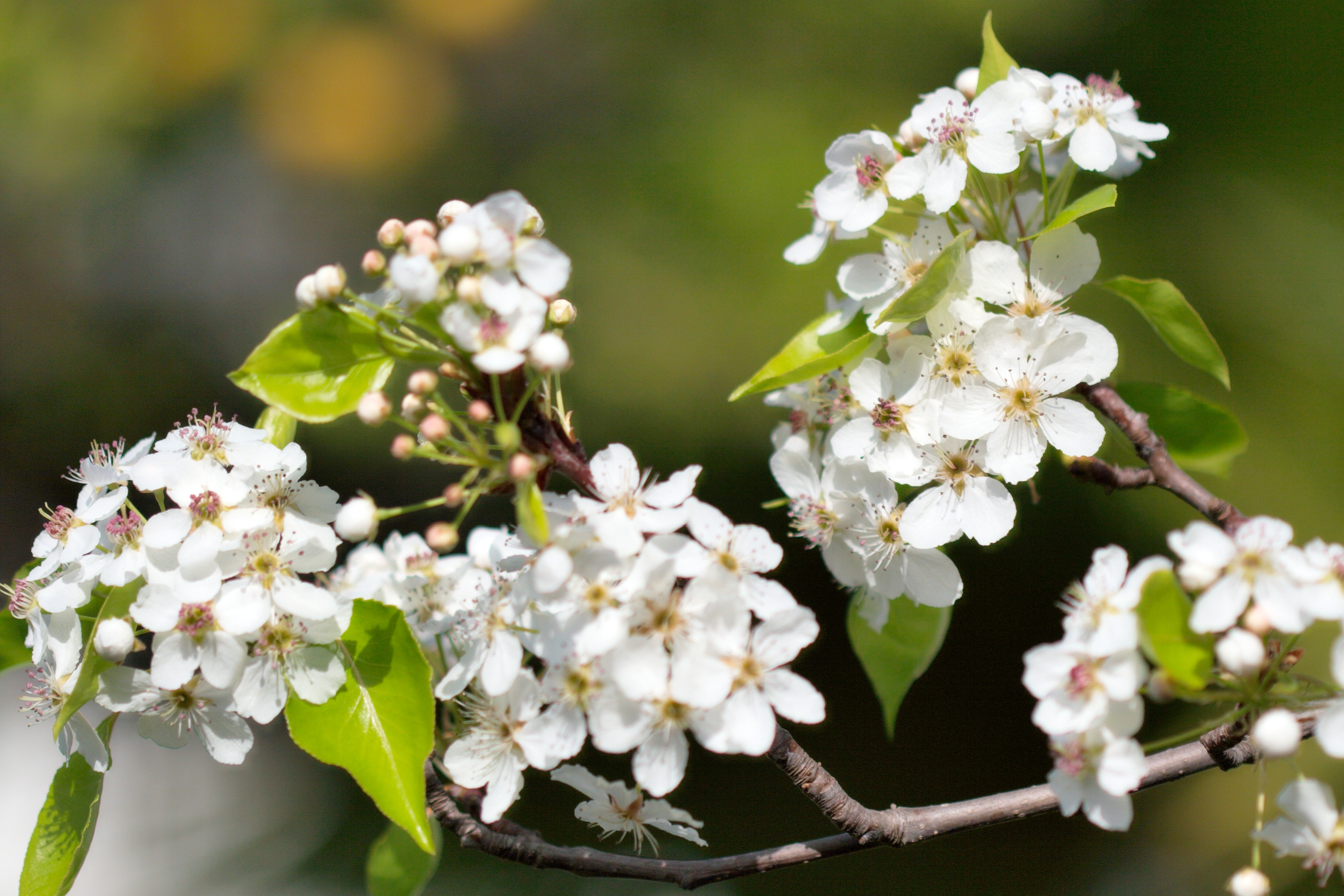

Scientific classification
- Kingdom: Plantae
- Clade: Tracheophytes
- Clade: Angiosperms
- Clade: Eudicots
- Clade: Rosids
- Order: Rosales
- Family: Rosaceae
- Genus: Pyrus
- Species: P. calleryana

Binomial name
- Pyrus calleryana Decne.

Synonyms
- List: Pyrus dimorphophylla Makino; Pyrus kawakamii Hayata; Pyrus mairei H.Lév.

= Pyrus calleryana =

Species of pear tree

Pyrus calleryana, also known as the Callery pear, is a species of pear tree native to East Asia in the family Rosaceae. Its cultivar Bradford pear, known for its offensive odor that some have described as akin to "rotting fish", is widely planted throughout the United States and increasingly regarded as an invasive species.

== Description ==
Pyrus calleryana is deciduous, growing to 5 to 8 m (16 to 26 ft) tall, often with a conical to rounded crown. The leaves are oval, 4 to 8 cm (1 1/2 to 3 in) long, glossy dark green above, and pale beneath. They have long petioles alternately arranged on branches. The white, five-petaled flowers are about 2 to 2.5 cm (3/4 to 1 in) in diameter. They are produced abundantly in early spring, before the leaves expand fully.

The fruits (which are often assumed to be inedible due to their abundant, cyanide-laced seeds) of the Callery pear are small (less than 1 centimetre (3/8 in) in diameter) and hard, almost woody, until softened by frost, after which they are readily taken by birds, which disperse the seeds in their droppings. When fully softened, their fruit pulp is palatable to humans as well. In summer, the shining foliage is dark green and very smooth, and in autumn, the leaves commonly turn brilliant colors, ranging from yellow and orange to more commonly red, pink, purple, and bronze. However, since the color often develops very late in autumn, the leaves may be killed by a hard frost before full color can develop.

Callery pears are remarkably resistant to disease or fireblight, but some cultivars, such as 'Bradford', are particularly susceptible to storm damage and are regularly disfigured or killed by strong winds, winter weather, or limb loss due to their naturally rapid growth rate and acute vertical branching.

== Taxonomy ==
The species was described by Joseph Decaisne in 1871.

=== Varieties ===
The following varieties are currently accepted:

- Pyrus calleryana var. calleryana – China, Taiwan, and Japan; introduced to the United States, India (Western Himalayas), and Iraq
- Pyrus calleryana var. fauriei (C.K.Schneid.) Rehder – Korea
- Pyrus calleryana var. integrifolia T.T.Yu – China
- Pyrus calleryana var. koehnei (C.K.Schneid.) T.T.Yu – China
- Pyrus calleryana var. lanceata Rehder – China

=== Etymology ===
The species is named after Italian-French missionary Joseph-Marie Callery (1810–1862), a sinologue who sent specimens of the tree to Europe from China.

== Distribution and habitat ==
It is native to mainland China, Japan, the Korean Peninsula, and Taiwan. It is reported as introduced in the United States, Canada, Iraq, and the Western Himalayas region of India.

== Cultivation ==
Numerous cultivars of Callery pear are offered commercially, including 'Aristocrat', 'Autumn Blaze', 'Bradford', 'Capital', 'Chanticleer' (also known as 'Cleveland Select'), 'New Bradford', 'Redspire', and 'Whitehouse'.

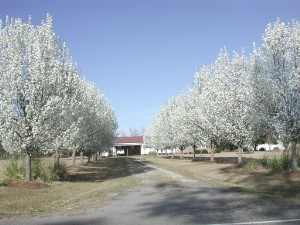
Cultivated Callery pears in flower

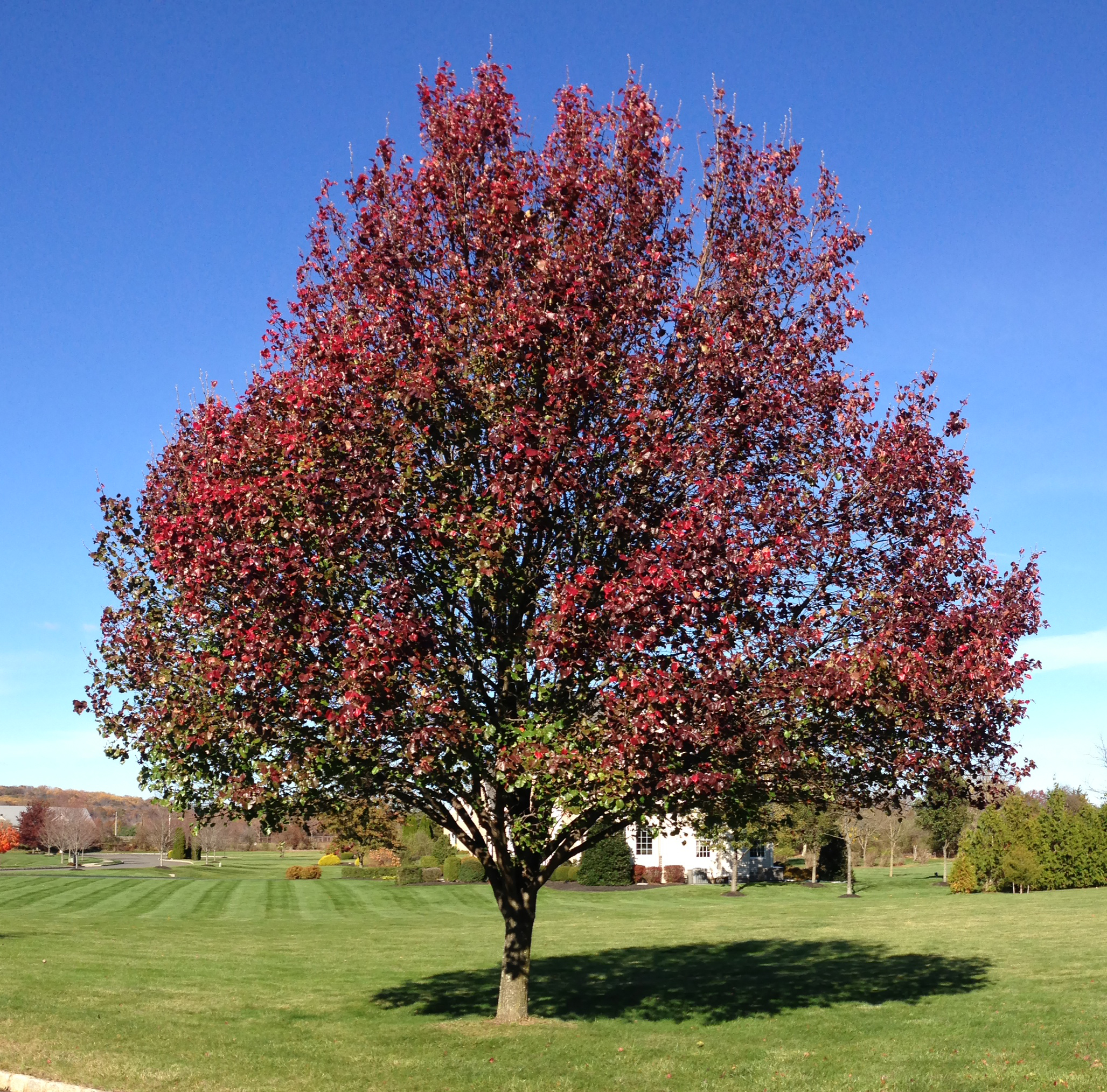
Autumn color

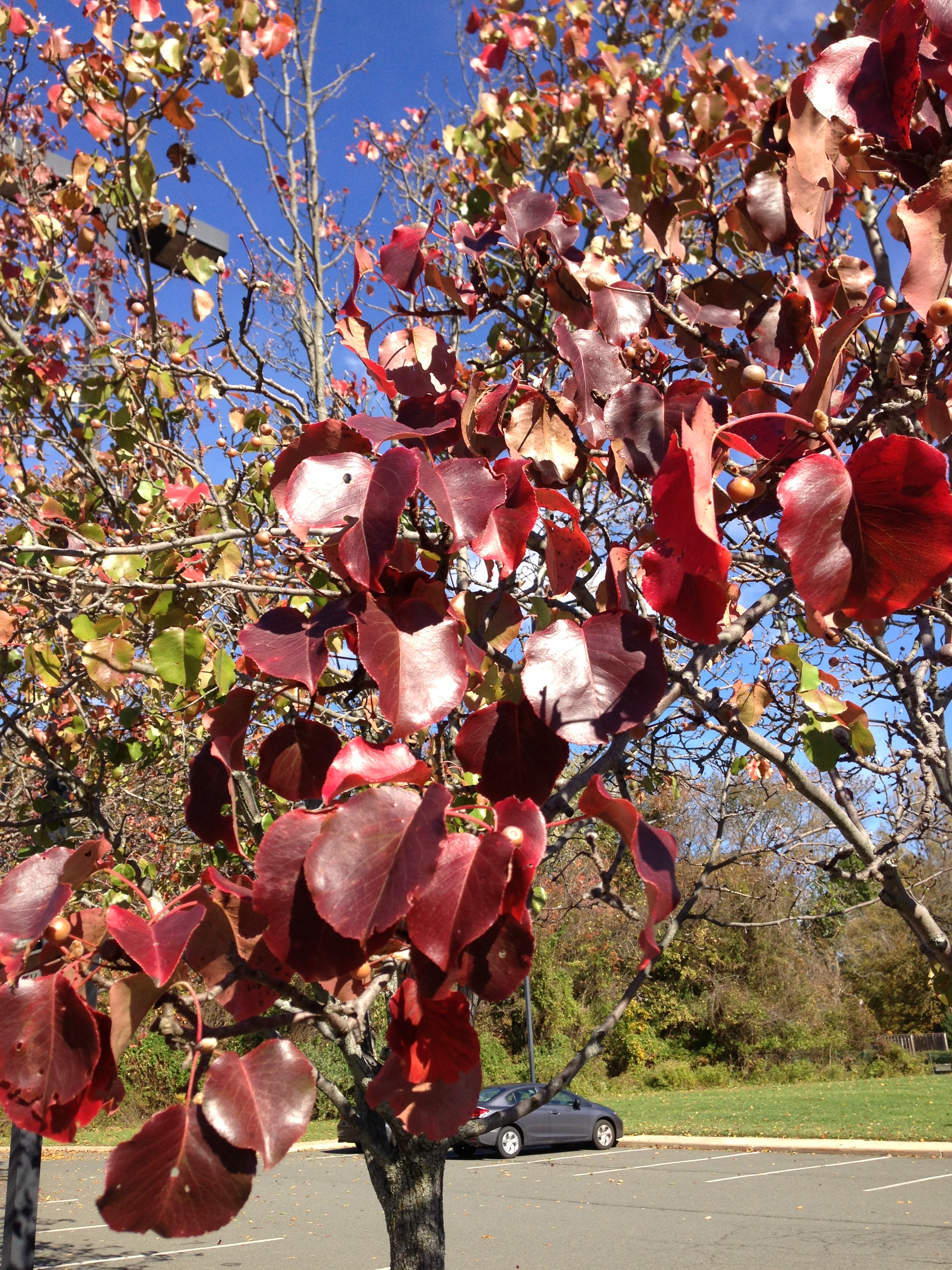
Autumn color

=== In the United States ===
The trees were introduced to the U.S. by the United States Department of Agriculture facility at Glenn Dale, Maryland, as ornamental landscape trees in the mid-1960s. They became popular with landscapers because they were inexpensive, transported well, and grew quickly. Lady Bird Johnson promoted the tree in 1966 by planting one in downtown Washington, DC. The New York Times also promoted the tree, saying, "Few trees possess every desired attribute, but the Bradford ornamental pear comes unusually close to the ideal."

In much of North America, these cultivars, particularly 'Bradford', are widely planted as ornamental trees. The trees are tolerant of a variety of soil types, drainage levels, and soil acidity. Their crown shape varies from ovate to elliptical, but may become asymmetric from limb loss due to excessive and unstable growth rate. The initial symmetry of several cultivars leads to their attempted use in settings such as industrial parks, streets, shopping centers, and office parks. Their dense clusters of white blossoms are conspicuous in early spring, with an odor often compared to rotting fish or semen. Individuals tend to flower young, exhibit quick growth, and create seeds that are dispersed primarily through birds. According to extension specialist Kelly Oten of North Carolina State University, the smell attracts flies which are the primary pollinators rather than bees. At the latitude of Pittsburgh, Pennsylvania, the trees often remain green until mid-November, and in warm autumns, the colors are often bright, although in a cold year they may get frozen off before coloring. In the South, Callery pears tend to be among the more reliable coloring trees.

A famous example of a Callery pear is the one that was found to have survived the destruction of the Twin Towers on 9/11 and was restored to full health subsequently. It is often referred to as "the Survivor Tree".

== As an invasive species ==
The Bradford pear and related cultivars of Pyrus calleryana are regarded as invasive species in many areas of the Eastern and Midwestern regions in North America, outcompeting many native plants and trees. In the northeastern United States, wild Callery pears sometimes form extensive, nearly homogeneous stands in old fields, along roadsides, and in similar disturbed areas. The species was first noticed spreading outside of human cultivation in the 1990s, and by the latter half of the 2000s, Callery pear trees were widespread and could be found in habitats ranging from wetlands to forests.

While various cultivars of the Callery pear are commonly planted for their ornamental value, their prolifically produced fruits are taken by birds, which disperse the seeds in their droppings. The various cultivars are generally themselves self-incompatible, unable to produce fertile seeds when self-pollinated, or cross-pollinated with another tree of the same cultivar. However, if different cultivars of Callery pears are grown in proximity (within insect-pollination distance, about 300 ft or 100 m), they often produce fertile seeds that can sprout and establish wherever they are dispersed. The resulting wild individuals, of various genetic backgrounds, can in turn interbreed, producing more viable seed and furthering expansion and dispersal of the wild stand of the species. These plants often differ from the selected cultivars in their irregular crown shape and (sometimes) presence of thorns.

Callery pear is reported as established outside cultivation in 152 counties in 25 states in the United States. While these wild plants are sometimes called "Bradford pear" (for the 'Bradford' cultivar), they are actually wild-growing descendants of multiple genotypes of Pyrus calleryana, hence more correctly are referred to by the common (or scientific) name of the species itself. Currently, the spread of the invasive trees is limited by their intolerance to extreme cold, but they are creeping northward and have been found as far north as Madison, Wisconsin.

The Bradford pear in particular has become further regarded as a nuisance tree for its initially neat, dense, upward growth, which made it desirable in cramped urban spaces. Without corrective selective pruning at an early stage, these weak crotches result in a multitude of narrow, weak forks that are very susceptible to storm damage. Because of this, and the resulting relatively short lifespan (typically less than 25 years), many groups have discouraged further planting of 'Bradford' and other similarly structurally deficient Callery pear cultivars (such as 'Cleveland Select') in favor of increasing use of locally native ornamental tree species.

Although P. calleryana is considered an invasive species, some cases have occurred in which it did not have an impact when introduced as a non-native species. In young, low-density populations, this tree was found to have no significant effect on species richness or diversity in its surrounding environment. To understand how this species interacts in a given environment, further studies should be considered.

In 2023 and 2024, respectively, Ohio and South Carolina banned the sale and cultivation of Callery pear trees.

In 2024, Pennsylvania added the Callery pear to its noxious weed list as a "Class B" noxious weed and banned its sale and distribution.

In September 2024, Massachusetts added the Callery pear to the Massachusetts Prohibited Plant List, banning the cultivation and import of the tree immediately with a ban on sales going into effect at the end of 2028.

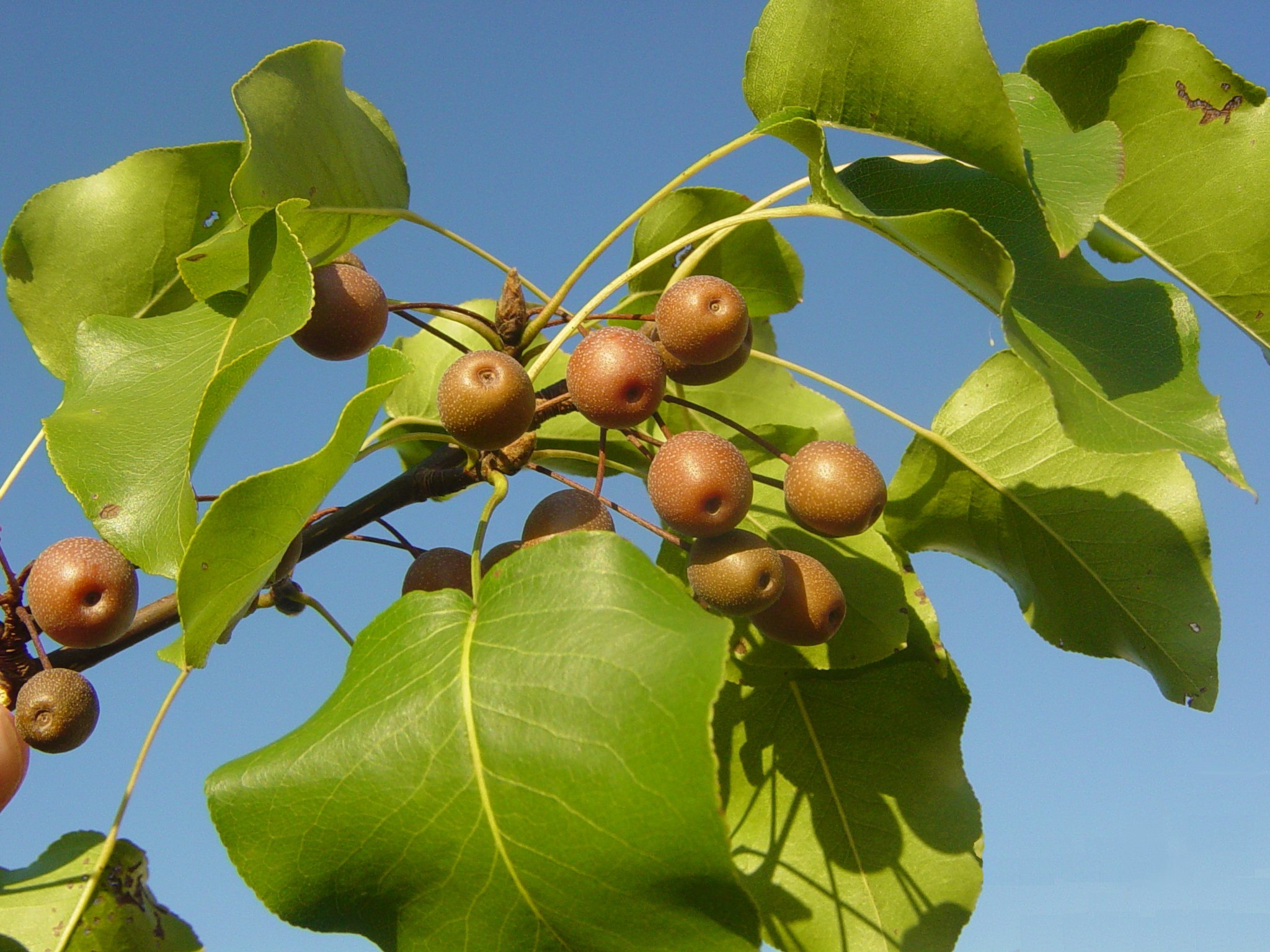
Fruit

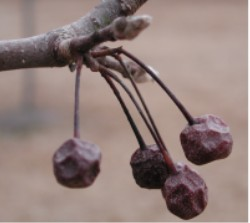
Fruit in winter

== Uses ==
Pear wood (of any species) is among the finest-textured of all fruitwoods. It is prized for making woodwind instruments, and pear veneer is used in fine furniture. Pear wood is also among those preferred for preparing woodcuts for printing, either end-grained for small works or side-grained for larger.

Callery pear has been used as rootstock for grafting such pear cultivars as Comice, Bosc, or Seckel, and especially for Nashi. Pyrus calleryana was first introduced into the United States in 1909 and 1916, largely influenced by the dedicated research of Frank N. Meyer, plant explorer for the US Department of Agriculture, commonly known for the discovery of the Meyer lemon, for agricultural experimentation, antedating recognition in the 1950s of the species' potential as an ornamental plant.

Often considered inedible, Callery pears tend to lose their astringency when bletted by fall frosts. Other potential ways to use the fruit include cooking and winemaking, similar to their botanical cousin quince.
