= Calleri =

Calleri (Italian pronunciation: [kalˈleːri]) is an Italian surname. Notable people with the surname include:

- Agustín Calleri (born 1976), Argentine tennis player
- Gianmarco Calleri (1942–2023), Italian footballer
- Giuseppe Calleri (1810–1862), Italian-French sinologist and naturalist
- Jonathan Calleri (born 1993), Argentine footballer
