= Taylor's gold =

Pear cultivar

Pear 'Taylor's gold'
- Genus: Pyrus
- Species: Pyrus communis
- Hybrid parentage: 'Bosc pear' and 'Doyenné du Comice'
- Cultivar: 'Taylor's gold'
- Breeder: Michael King-Turner
- Origin: New Zealand

Taylor's gold is a pear variety thought to be a mutant of the pear Doyenné du Comice. It has a russeted cinnamon coloured skin and a juicy aromatic flavour. It was discovered in New Zealand in 1986.

It was first found within an orchard belonging to Michael King-Turner, living near Nelson, New Zealand. It was first thought to be a relative of a Comice pear, but was later believed to be a natural cross between a 'Bosc pear' and 'Comice' pear. It was then sent to the US in 1998 and grown in Washington (state).
