= Enoch Bartlett =

- Born: Enoch Bartlett; 1779; Haverhill, Massachusetts
- Died: 1860

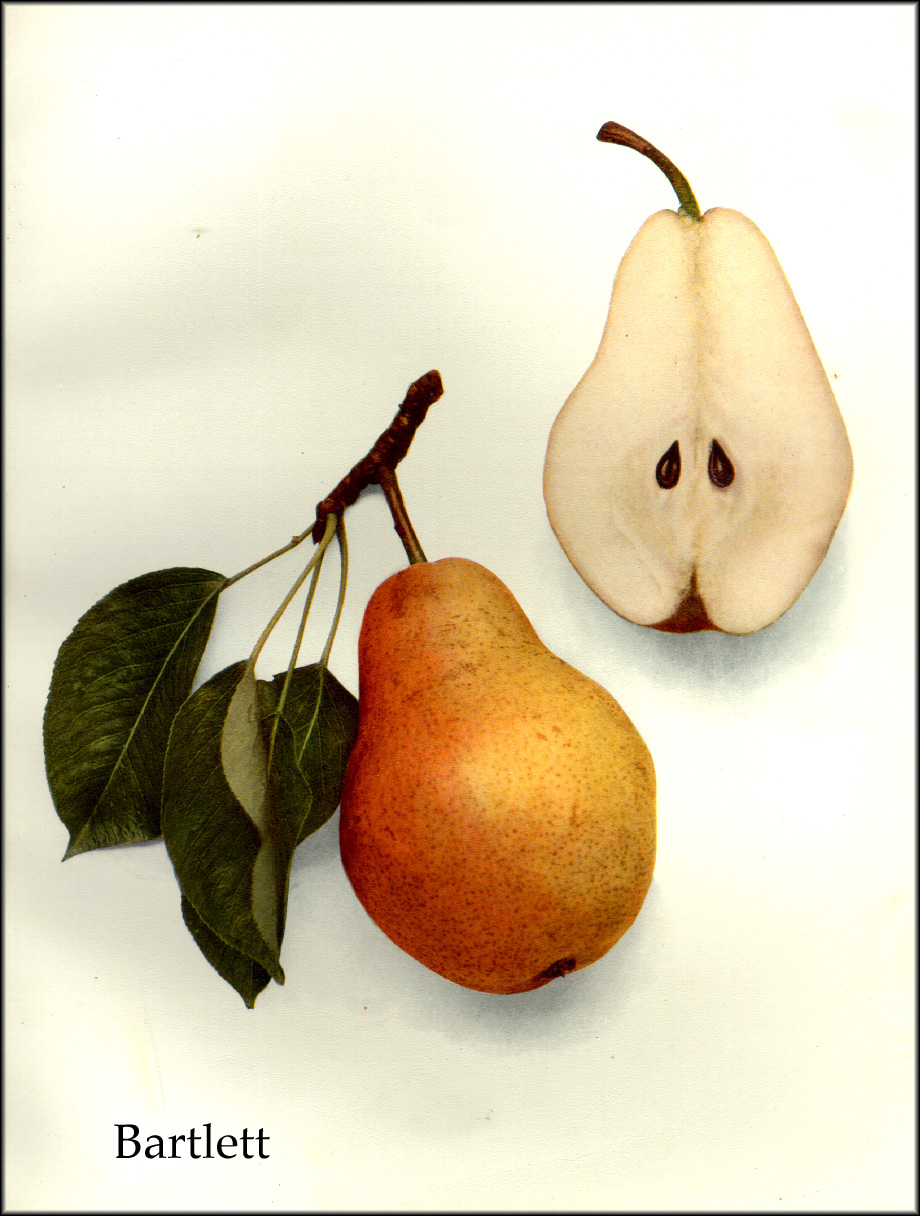
Bartlett pear, from The Pears of New York (1921) by Ulysses Prentiss Hedrick

Enoch Bartlett (1779–1860) was a merchant and farmer from Dorchester, Massachusetts, who owned what had been Thomas Brewer's farm in Roxbury. This farm had a field of pear trees, one of which had particularly fine fruit. Because it was thought to be a seedling tree, it became known by the name "Bartlett pear", but in 1828 a new batch of pear trees arrived from England, and it was realised that the Bartlett pear was the same as the Williams pear. By this time the name "Bartlett pear" had stuck, and is still the most common name for this type of pear in Canada and the United States.
