= Durondeau pear =

The Durondeau pear (also known as Tongern, Birne von Tongern, Poire de Tongres and Beurré Durondeau} is a Belgian pear variety with a very pronounced, aromatic, fresh-sweet-sour taste. It was developed by the Walloon breeder Charles Louis Durondeau, from Tongre-Notre-Dame (fr) in Hainaut in the early 19th Century.

The Durondeau pear has a moderate to medium growth with thin, open and pendulous twigs and branches.

The fruits are medium to very large, with a greenish skin and firm flesh. The tastiest pears often have a red tinge along one side.

The Durondeau pear has a limited shelf life and should be eaten before the moment of maximum ripening. When the skin turns yellow, the flesh becomes less solid, slippery and bland and the typical tartness disappears.

The Durondeau season is short, lasting no more than a month. The fruits are typically at their peak in October, although this varies depending on the weather. Pears that reach the consumer in November or December often have brown spots inside and the flesh is floury and tasteless.
