= Belle de Brillet =

Belle de Brillet is a pear liqueur produced by Maison J. R. Brillet, France. It is made by infusing Brillet cognac with the essence of Williams pears. Roughly 20 pounds (9.1 kg) of pears are needed to produce each 750mL bottle.

== Awards ==
Belle de Brillet was named one of the top 100 Spirits of 2016 by Wine Enthusiast magazine.
