= Concorde (pear) =

Cultivar of pear

Concorde pear
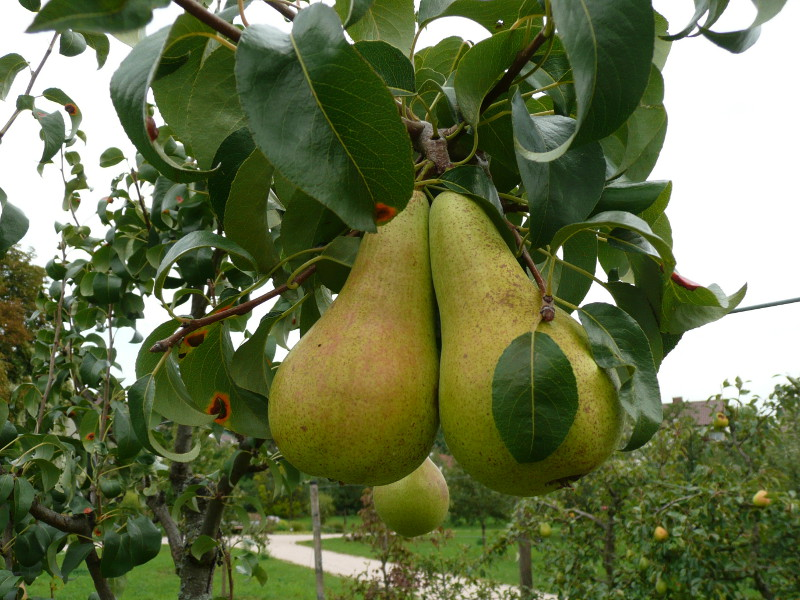
- Genus: Pyrus
- Species: Pyrus communis
- Hybrid parentage: Conference × Comice
- Cultivar: Concorde
- Origin: Kent, United Kingdom

The Concorde is a cultivar of pear originating in England. A cross of the Conference and Comice varieties, it has some of the traits of both parents.

== Cultivar history ==
The Concorde was developed at the East Malling Research Station in Kent. After artificial pollination was completed in 1968, a number of candidate varieties were developed and the Concorde was selected as the best one in 1977. It was released commercially in 1994. It received the Royal Horticultural Society's Award of Garden Merit in 1993.

== Growing characteristics ==
The tree of the Concorde pear is upright and moderately vigorous. It flowers about five days after its parent varieties, and like the Comice is a late harvest pear. It is partially self-fertile, and is classed as group 3/4 in the RHS pollination groups. It is a regular cropper that can sometimes overproduce fruit, and it produces a first crop about a year earlier than most varieties.

== Fruit characteristics ==
The Concorde's fruit is considered a blend of its parent varieties, with the elongated shape and crisp texture of its Conference parent combined with the sweetness of the Comice. The fruit has a greenish color initially, becoming more yellowish with ripening, and may exhibit slight russeting.
