= Joseph-Marie Callery =

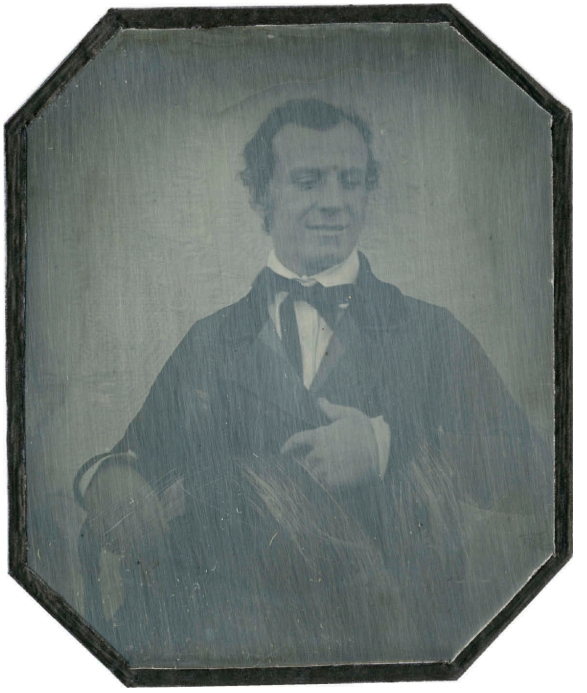
A Daguerreotype by Jules Itier made on 22 August 1845

Joseph-Gaëtan-Pierre-Maxime-Marie Callery or Giuseppe Gaetano Pietro Massimo Maria Calleri in Italian form (25 June 1810 – 8 June 1862) was an Italian-French Roman Catholic missionary who travelled into Southeast Asia where he studied Chinese and collected specimens of natural history from the region. He published an encyclopedia on the Chinese language and several species of plants have been named after him.

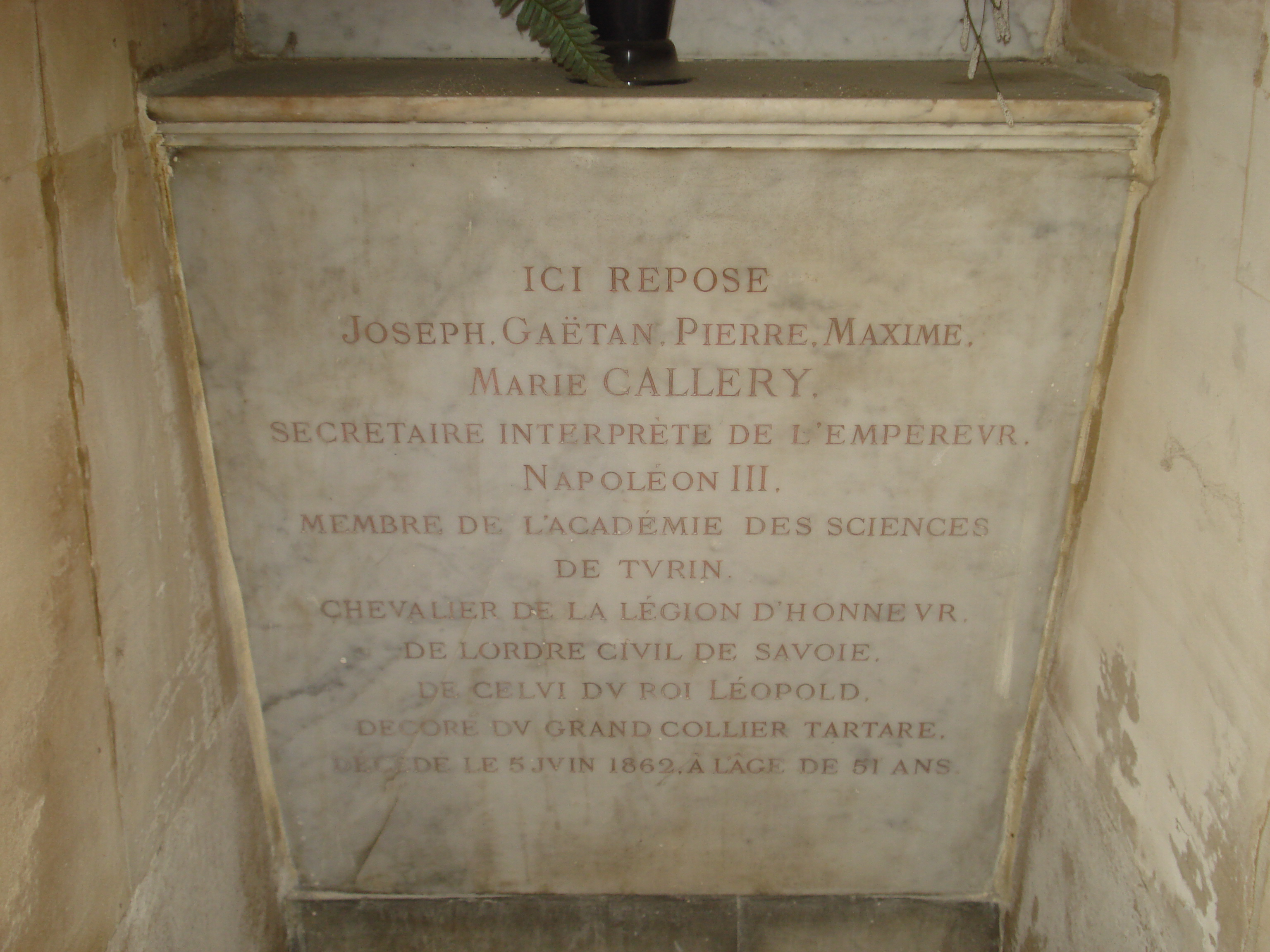
Gravestone from Montmartre Cemetery

Callery was born in Turin where his mother Anna Maria Antonia was a tailor and his father Gaetano a silk merchant. He studied the classics in Lyons and worked for a while as a shop clerk. He was ordained priest in 1834 following studies at the Missions étrangères de Paris. He was sent into Southeast Asia, but unable to get to his destination in Korea, he lived in Macau where he studied Chinese under the Portuguese sinologist Joaquim Afonso Gonçalves (1780–1844). In 1841 he published a dictionary of Chinese in Latin. In 1842 he was expelled from the mission and after a return to France he received a new position as an interpreter for Théodose de Lagrené's Embassy in Macao. He helped in the success of the Treaty of Whampoa between the Qing dynasty and the Kingdom of France. He returned to Paris in 1846 where he lived the rest of his life.

Callery collected specimens of natural history during his travels. Some of his bird specimens were presented to the Turin museum. The plants Eugenia calleryana and Pyrus calleryana were named from among the nearly 2000 species of plants that he collected.

He married Henriette-Louise-Clémentine Quelquejeu in 1861 in Lisses and they had six children including the historian Alphonse (1847–1909). He died at the age of 51 and was buried at the cemetery at Montmartre.
