= Doyenné du Comice =

Pear cultivar

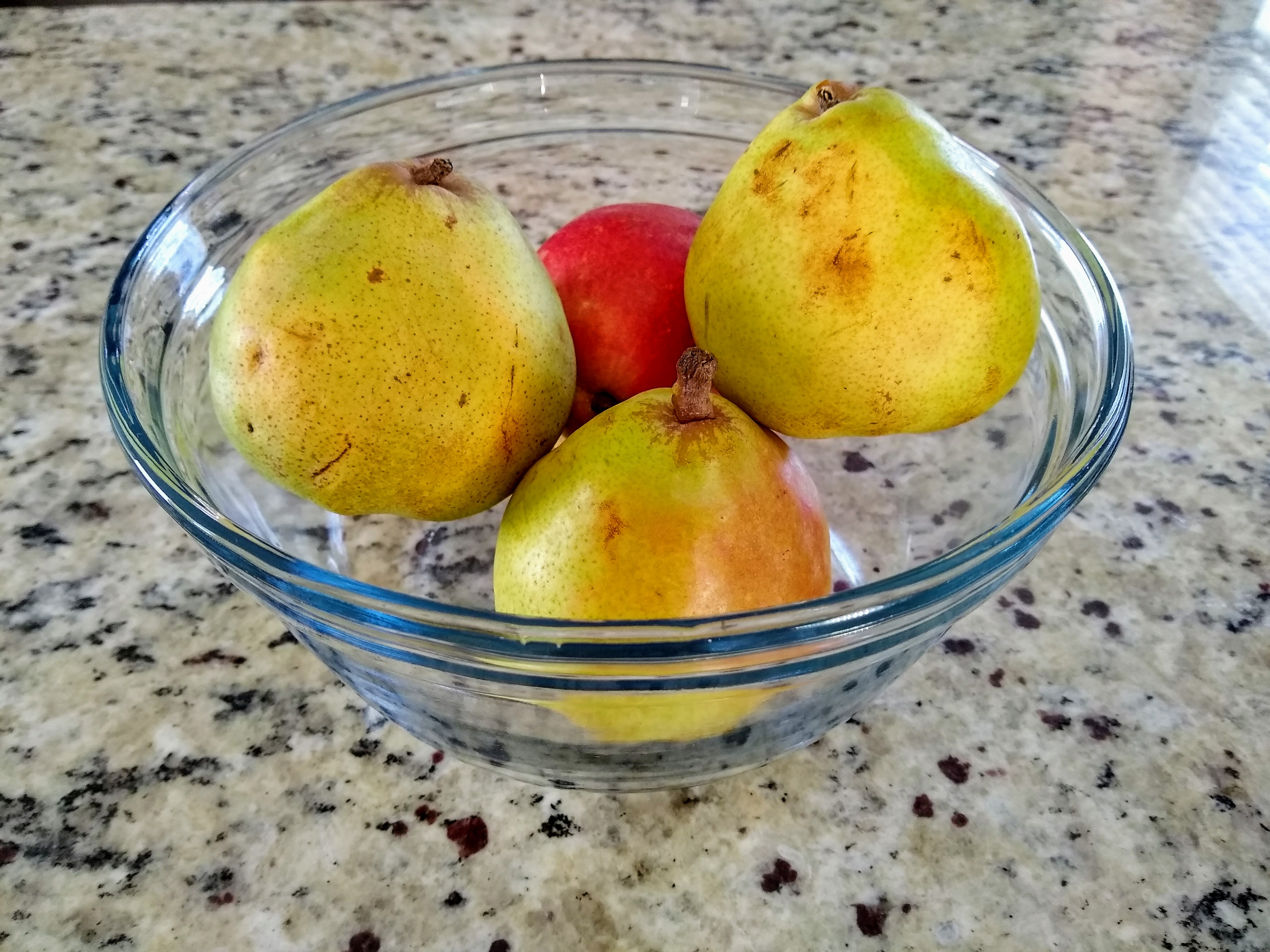
- Genus: Pyrus
- Species: Pyrus communis
- Cultivar: Doyenné du Comice
- Origin: Angers, France

The Doyenné du Comice (or Comice) is a French pear variety first cultivated in the 19th century.

== Cultivar history ==
The Doyenné du Comice pear originated in France, where it was first grown at the Comice Horticole in Angers in the 1840s. The varietal was a chance discovery, and a commemorative plaque in the Loire states: "In this garden was raised in 1849-50 the celebrated pear Doyenné du Comice by the gardener Dhomme and by Millet de la Turtaudiere, President of the Comice Horticole." It was brought to the United States in 1850 as a seedling and may be sold there as Royal Riviera.

== Growing characteristics ==
The Comice tree is vigorous, with small, round oval leaves. It is a late season bloomer, similar to the Bosc or Anjou pears. It is likewise a late harvest pear, about 150 days after blooming. It is self-sterile and placed in the Royal Horticultural Society's pollination group 4.

== Fruit characteristics ==
The Comice pear is large and greenish-yellow, with a red blush and some russeting. Its flesh is pale, melting, and very juicy. Because the skin is very delicate and easily bruised, it requires special handling and is not well suited to mechanical packing.

The Comice pear has received great acclaim. The London Horticultural Journal in 1894 called it the best pear in the world. It was praised by Edward Bunyard in his "Anatomy of Dessert" (1929), in which he described it as having "the perfect combination of flavour, aroma, and texture of which man had long dreamed." It was awarded the RHS Award of Garden Merit in 1993 and reconfirmed in 2013.

== See also ==
- Taylor's gold, a mutant variety of the Comice
