= Bosc pear =

Flowering plant cultivar

Bosc Pear
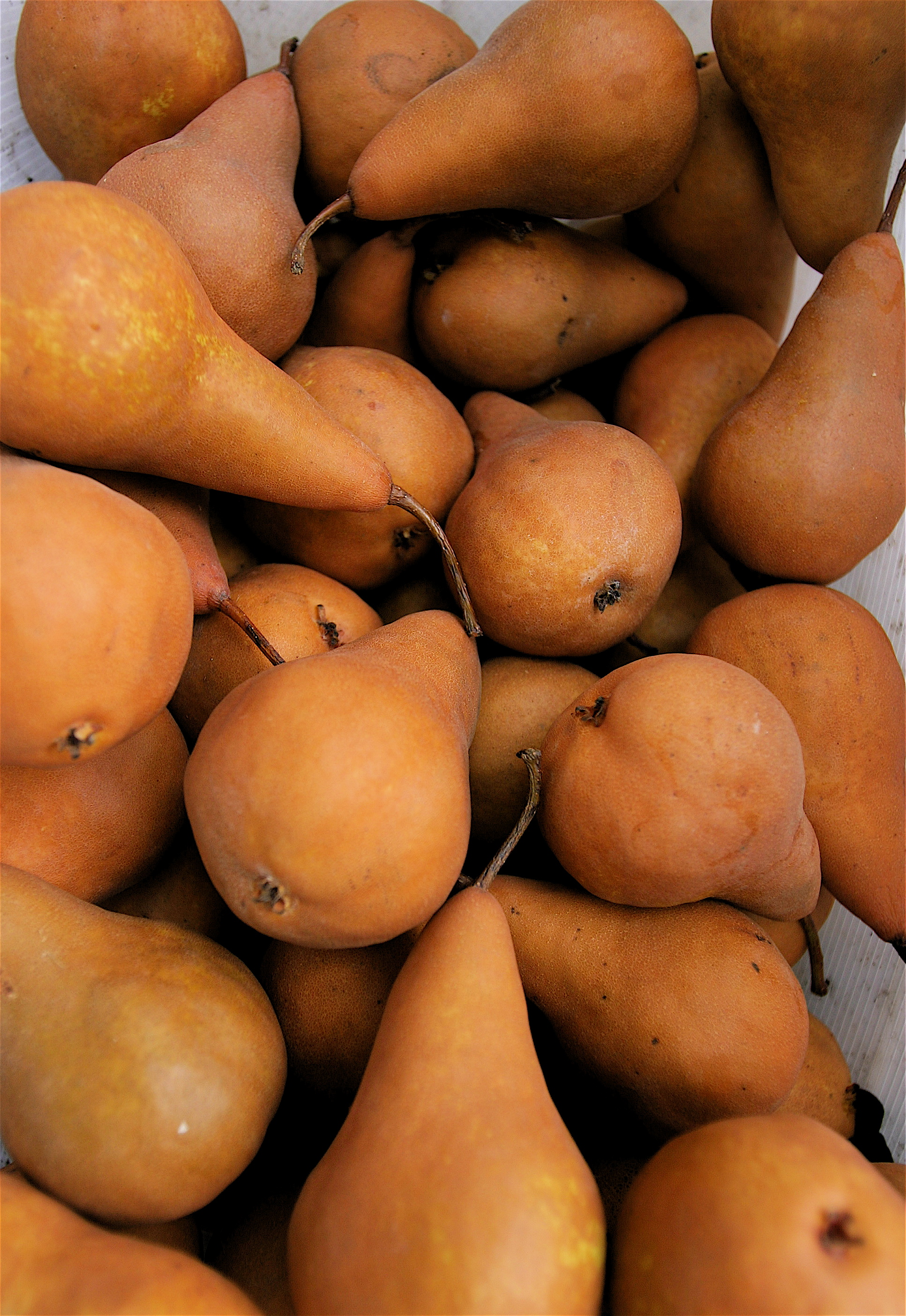
- Oregon-grown Bosc pears
- Genus: Pyrus
- Species: Pyrus communis
- Cultivar: 'Bosc'

The Beurré Bosc or Bosc is a cultivar of the European pear (Pyrus communis), originally from France or Belgium. Also known as the Kaiser, it is grown in Europe; Australia; Argentina; the provinces of British Columbia and Ontario in Canada, and the states of California, Washington, and Oregon in the United States.

The Beurré Bosc was cultivated first in Belgium or France. The name Bosc is given after a French horticulturist named Louis Bosc, and "Beurré" means "buttery," referring to the fruit's soft, juicy texture.

Characteristic features are a long tapering neck and russet skin. Famous for its warm cinnamon color, the Bosc is nicknamed the "aristocrat of pears" and is often used in drawings, paintings, and photography due to its shape. Its white flesh is denser, crisper and smoother than that of the 'Williams or D'Anjou pear. It is suitable for poaching.

== History ==
It is unclear whether the variety originated in Belgium or France. The first time that Bosc pears were seen was in the early 1800s.

== Season ==
The season of Bosc pears starts in autumn, all the way through spring.

In South Africa, Beurré Bosc pears are harvested from late January to early February.

== Taste and ripeness ==
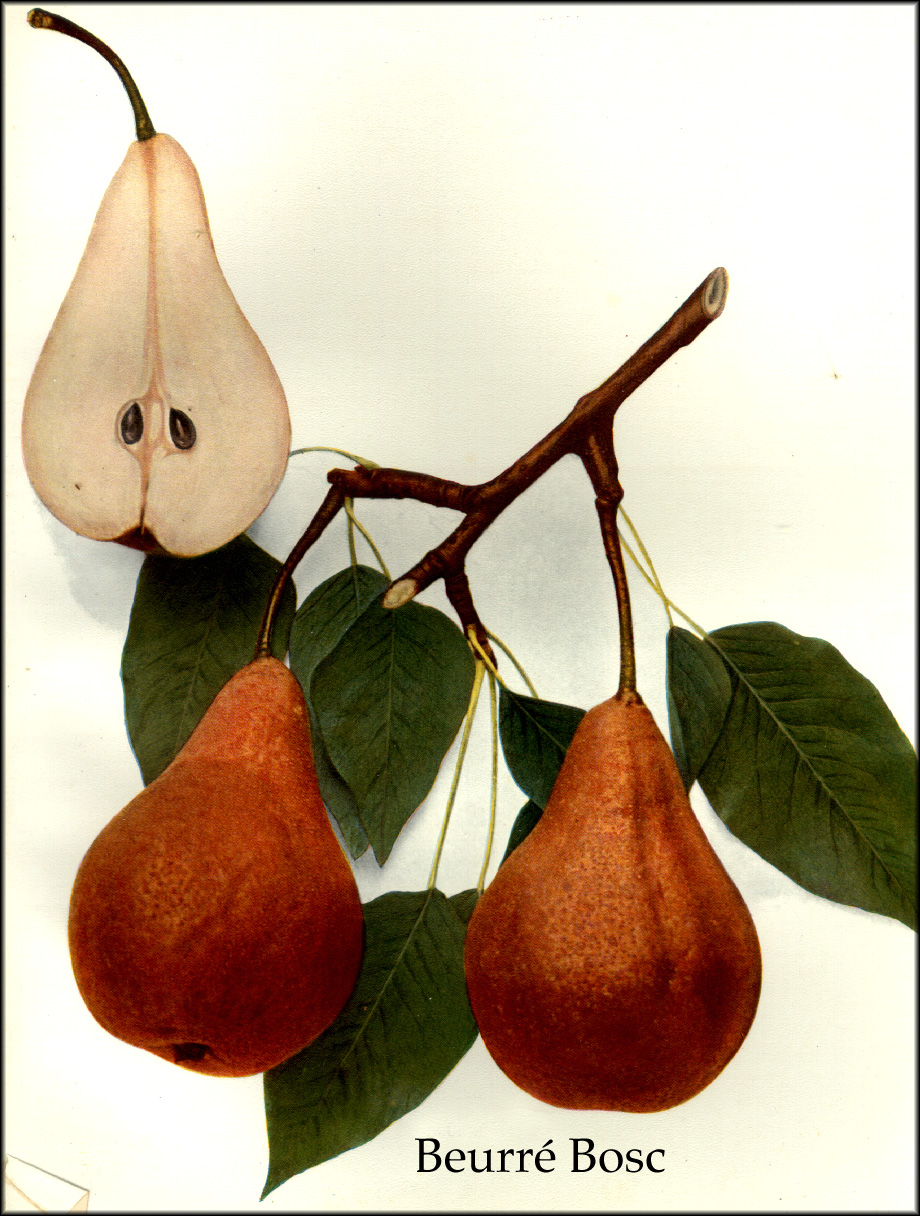
Bosc Pear, from The Pears of New York (1921) by Ulysses Prentiss Hedrick

Bosc pears are characterised by their hard flesh and brown skin. Early in their ripeness cycle they tend to be juicy, crunchy and sweet. When fully ripe the fruit becomes sweeter and softer, and the skin becomes wrinkly.

Extra fancy and fancy grades of Bosc pears in Canada should be at least 54 mm in diameter. They should be smooth, clean and properly formed.

== Nutrition ==
In a 100 g (3.5 oz) reference amount, a pear provides 57 calories and is a good source of carbohydrates, including dietary fiber, but otherwise is low in micronutrient content (see nutrition description and table).

== Uses ==
Since Bosc pears have a firm and solid flesh, they can be used in a variety of ways such as baking, broiling and poaching. They can maintain their form throughout the process, making them a resilient fruit to use.
