= D'Anjou =

Pear cultivar

'D'Anjou' pear
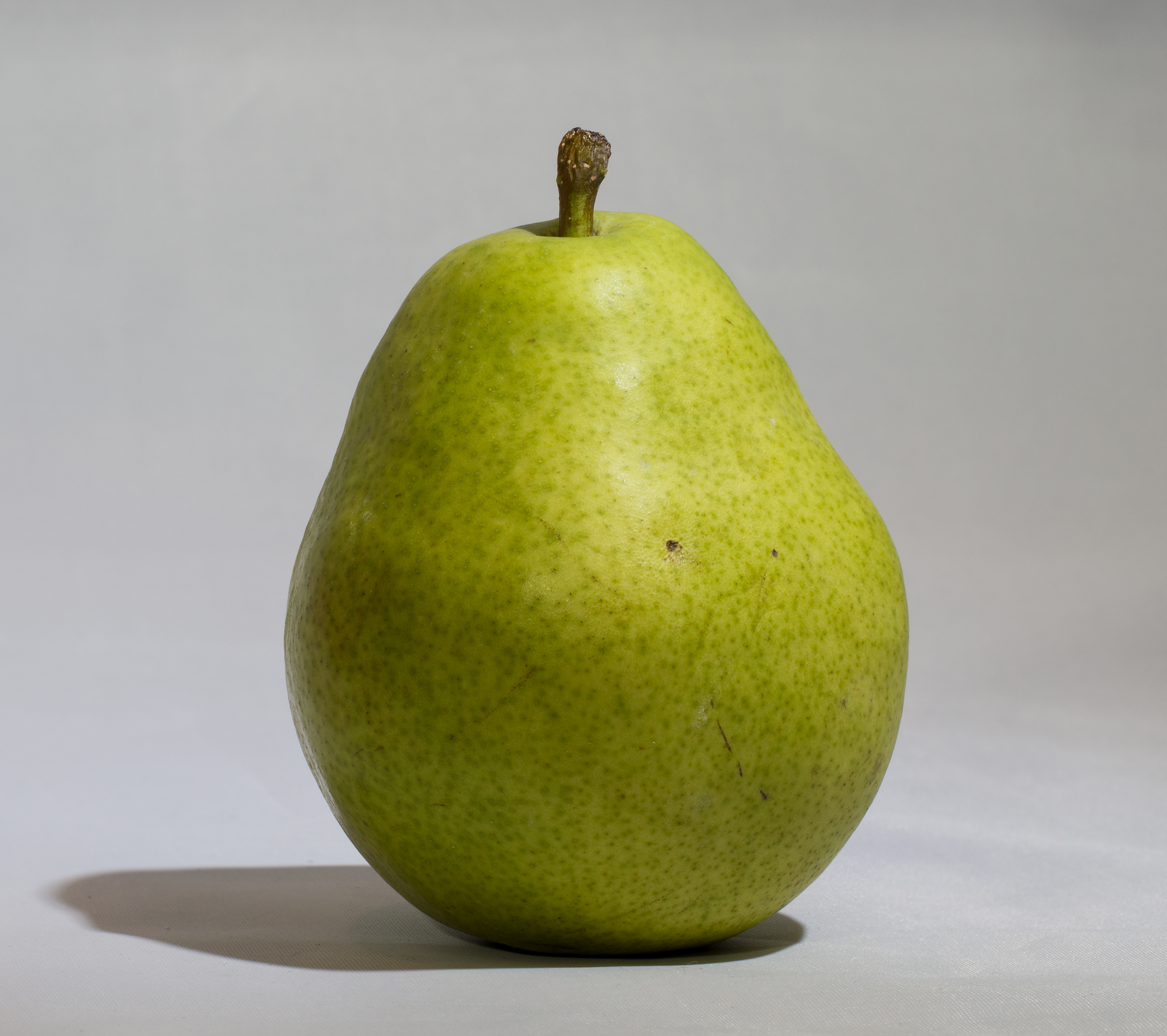
- D'Anjou pear
- Genus: Pyrus
- Species: Pyrus communis
- Cultivar: 'D'Anjou'
- Origin: Belgium, France

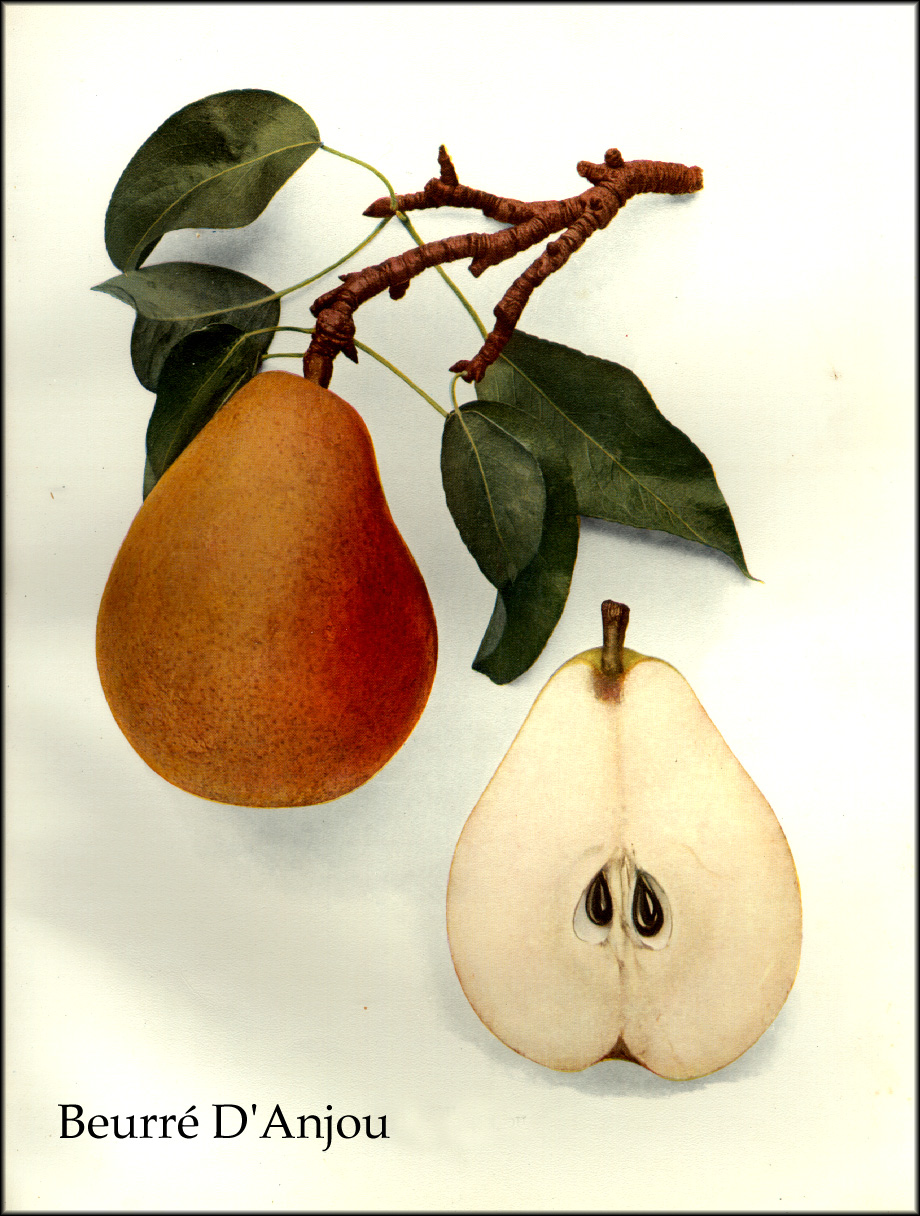
Beurré d'Anjou, from The Pears of New York (1921) by Ulysses Prentiss Hedrick

The d'Anjou pear, sometimes referred to as the Beurré d'Anjou or simply Anjou, is a short-necked cultivar of European pear. The variety was originally named 'Nec Plus Meuris' in Europe and the name 'Anjou' or 'd'Anjou' was erroneously applied to the variety when introduced to America and England. It is thought to have originated in the mid-19th century, in Belgium or France.

== Cultivars ==
The two cultivars that comprise d'Anjou pears are the 'Green Anjou' pear and the 'Red Anjou' pear. The 'Green Anjou' pear has a pale green skin that does not change color as the pear ripens, unlike most other cultivars of green pears, which turn yellow as they ripen. The 'Red Anjou' pear originated as naturally occurring bud sport found on 'Green Anjou' trees. 'Red Anjou' pears are very similar to the original Anjou other than color.

The d'Anjou is considered a medium to large pear, typically around 270–285 grams (9.5–10.1 oz), 85 mm (3.3 in) in height, and 80 mm (3.1 in) in diameter. It has a wide, globular base, short stem, and thin skin with many notable lenticels.

== Suggestions ==
Because this pear does not show ripeness by color, a 2015 Mercury News article recommends testing the top near the stem with a slight press of the thumb until it gives slightly. This is because the pear ripens from the inside out and the top is closest to the inside. It typically takes 3 to 5 days after purchase for the pear to ripen whereupon it may be refrigerated to slow (but not stop) the ripening, giving the consumer a couple more days to eat it. It can be used for baking or sliced in salads, and they are also good for poaching, roasting, grilling, or eating fresh.

== U.S. production ==
In the United States, the variety was recommended for general cultivation by the American Pomological Congress in 1852, and as of 2004 represented 34% of reported U.S. pear production, with Oregon the leading state.
