= Hedge =

Planted row of shrubs

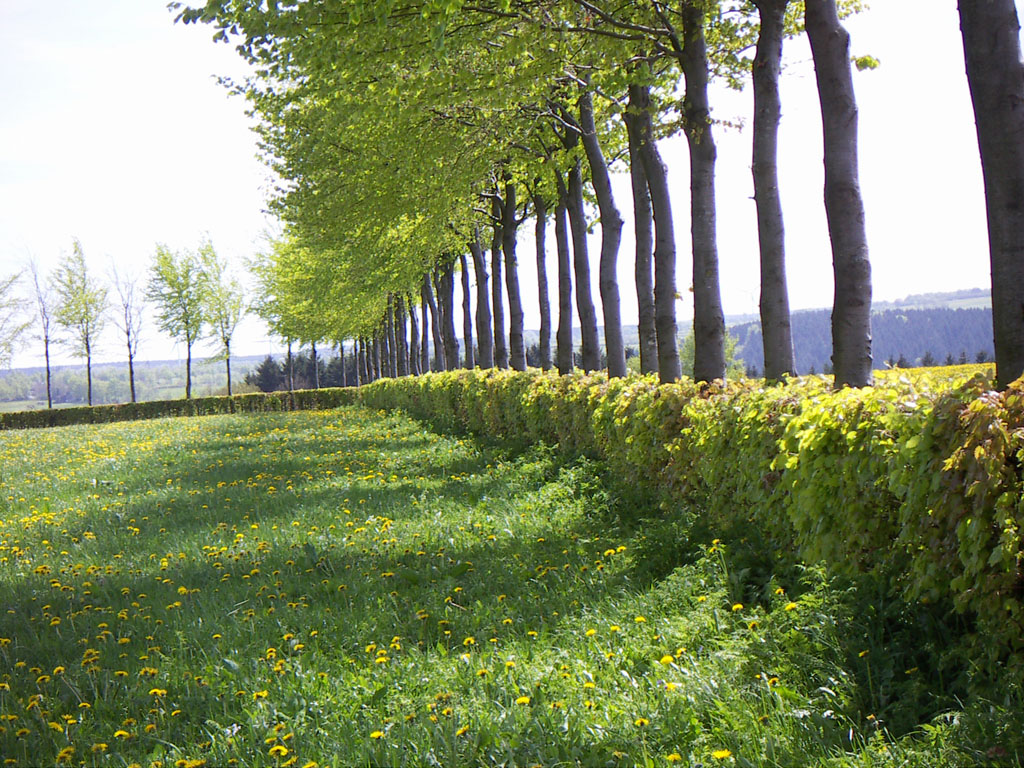
A typical clipped European beech hedge in the Eifel, Germany

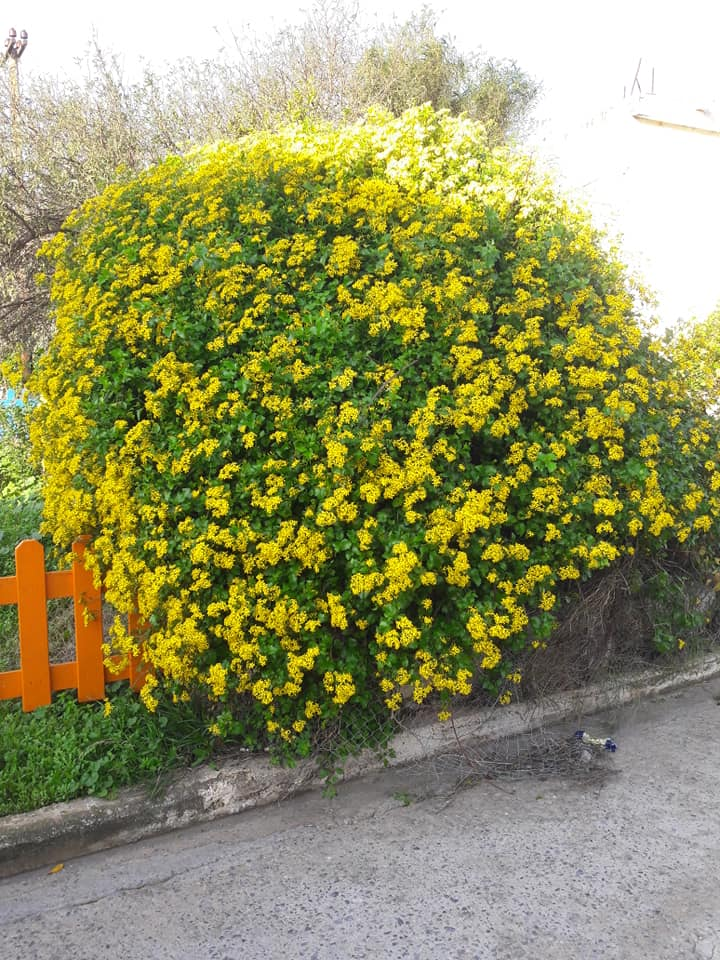
A round hedge of creeping groundsel

A hedge or hedgerow is a line of shrubs and sometimes trees, planted and trained to form a barrier or to mark the boundary of an area, such as between neighbouring properties. Hedges that are used to separate a road from adjoining fields or one field from another, and are of sufficient age to incorporate larger trees, are known as hedgerows. Often they serve as windbreaks to improve conditions for the adjacent crops, as in bocage country. When clipped and maintained, hedges are also a simple form of topiary. Hedges and Hedgerows are usually no wider than about three feet (one meter).

A hedge often operates as, and sometimes is called, a "live fence". This may either consist of individual fence posts connected with wire or other fencing material, or it may be in the form of densely planted hedges without interconnecting wire. This is common in tropical areas where low-income farmers can demarcate properties and reduce maintenance of fence posts that otherwise deteriorate rapidly. Many other benefits can be obtained depending on the species chosen.

== History ==
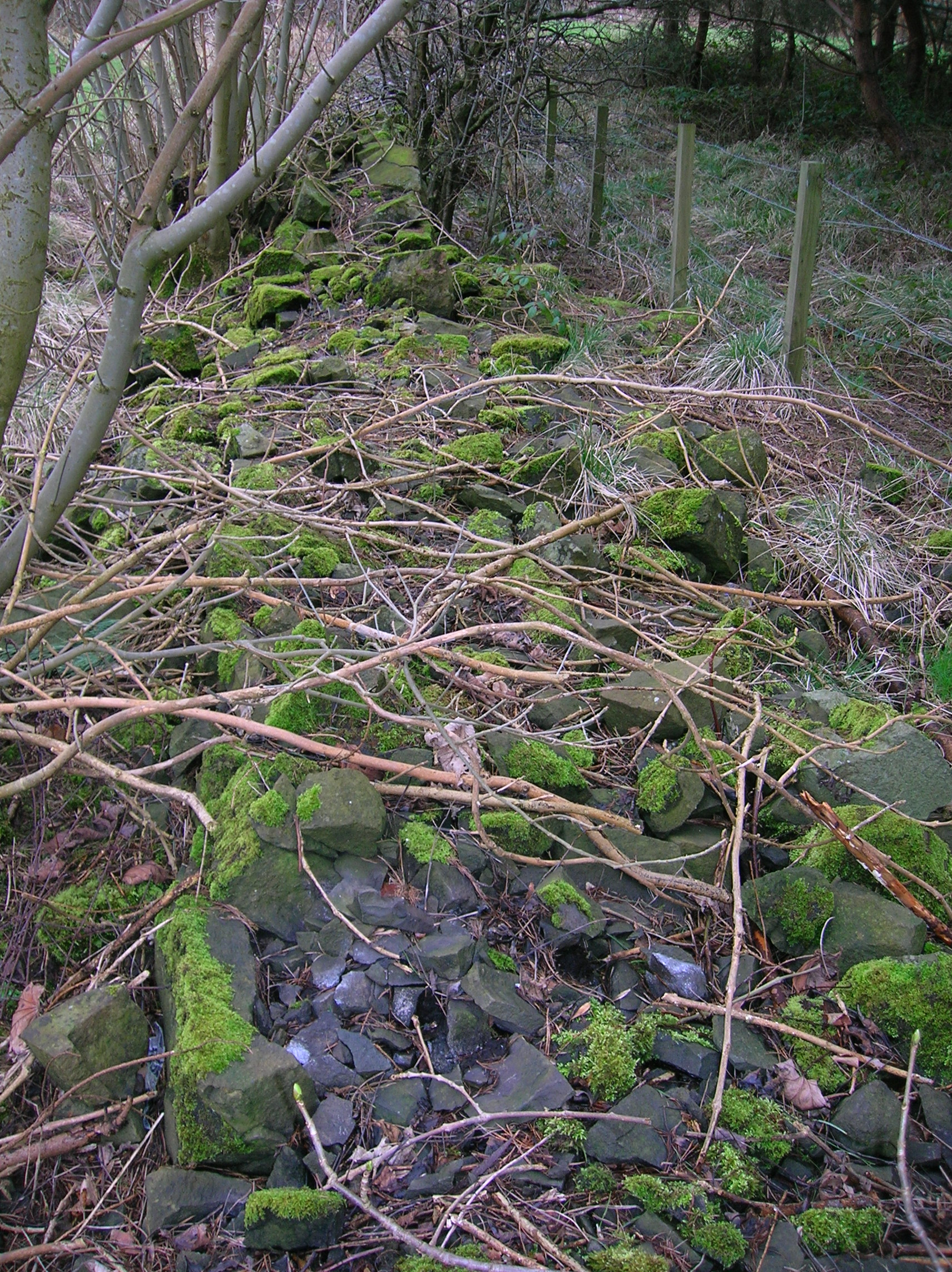
A typical old Scottish march dyke, but without boundary trees

The development of hedges over the centuries is preserved in their structure. The first hedges enclosed land for cereal crops during the Neolithic Age (4000–6000 years ago). The farms were of about 5 to 10 hectares (12 to 25 acres), with fields about 0.1 hectares (0.25 acres) for hand cultivation. Some hedges date from the Bronze and Iron Ages, 2000–4000 years ago, when traditional patterns of landscape became established. Others were built during the Medieval field rationalisations; more originated in the industrial boom of the 18th and 19th centuries, when heaths and uplands were enclosed.

Many hedgerows separating fields from lanes in the United Kingdom, Ireland and the Low Countries are estimated to have been in existence for more than seven hundred years, originating in the medieval period. The root word of 'hedge' is much older: it appears in the Old English language, in German (Hecke), and Dutch (haag) to mean 'enclosure', as in the name of the Dutch city The Hague, or more formally 's Gravenhage, meaning The Count's hedge. Charles the Bald is recorded as complaining in 864, at a time when most official fortifications were constructed of wooden palisades, that some unauthorized men were constructing haies et fertés; tightly interwoven hedges of hawthorns.

In parts of Britain, early hedges were often destroyed to make way for the manorial open-field system. Many were replaced after the inclosure acts, then removed again during modern agricultural intensification, and now some are being replanted for wildlife. As of 2024 in a study using Lidar by the UK Centre for Ecology & Hydrology England alone was found to have a total of 390,000 km of hedgerows, which would span the circumference of the earth 10 times; at their greatest historical extent, Britain had 1,000,000 km of hedgerows.

== Composition ==
A hedge may consist of a single species or several, typically mixed at random. In many newly planted British hedges, at least 60 per cent of the shrubs are hawthorn, blackthorn, and (in the southwest) hazel, alone or in combination. The first two are particularly effective barriers to livestock. In North America, Maclura pomifera (i.e., hedge apple) was grown to form a barrier to exclude free-range livestock from vegetable gardens and corn fields. Other shrubs and trees used include holly, beech, oak, ash, and willow; the last three can become very tall. Of the hedgerows in the Normandy region of France, Martin Blumenson said,

The hedgerow is a fence, half earth, half hedge. The wall at the base is a dirt parapet that varies in thickness from one to four or more feet and in height from three to twelve feet. Growing out of the wall is a hedge of hawthorn, brambles, vines, and trees, in thickness from one to three feet. Originally property demarcations, hedgerows protect crops and cattle from the ocean winds that sweep across the land.

The hedgerows of Normandy became barriers that slowed the advance of Allied troops following the D-Day invasion during World War II. Allied armed forces modified their armored vehicles to facilitate breaking out of their beachheads into the Normandy bocage.

=== Species ===
Formal, or modern garden hedges are grown in many varieties, including the following species:

- Berberis thunbergii – native to Japan and eastern Asia
- Buxus sempervirens (box) – native to western and southern Europe, northwest Africa, and southwest Asia, from southern England south to northern Morocco, and east through the northern Mediterranean region to Turkey.
- Carpinus betulus (European hornbeam) – native to Western Asia and central, eastern, and southern Europe, including southern England.
- Crataegus monogyna (hawthorn) – native to Europe, northwestern Africa, and West Asia
- Fagus sylvatica (European green beech) – native from northern Europe, in Sweden, Denmark, Norway, Germany, Poland, Switzerland, Bulgaria, eastern parts of Russia, Romania, through central Europe to France, southern England, northern Portugal, central Spain, and east to northwest Turkey where it intergrades with the oriental beech (Fagus orientalis)
- Fagus sylvatica 'Purpurea' (European purple beech) – a variant of the above
- Ilex aquifolium (European holly) – native to western and southern Europe, northwest Africa, and southwest Asia
- Ligustrum ovalifolium (privet) – native to Japan and Korea
- Ligustrum × ibolium (north privet) – native to Japan and Korea
- Photinia × fraseri (red robin) – a hybrid between Photinia glabra and Photinia serratifolia, native to Japan, China, Taiwan, the Philippines, Indonesia, and India, respectively
- Prunus laurocerasus (common cherry-laurel) – native to regions bordering the Black Sea in southwestern Asia and southeastern Europe, from Albania and Bulgaria east through Turkey to the Caucasus Mountains and northern Iran
- Prunus lusitanica (Portuguese cherry-laurel) – native to southwestern France, Spain, Portugal, Morocco, and Macaronesia (the Azores, Canary Islands and Madeira)
- Quercus ilex (holm oak) – native to the Mediterranean region
- Taxus baccata (yew) – native to Western Europe, Central Europe and Southern Europe (including Great Britain and Ireland), Northwest Africa, northern Iran, and Southwest Asia
- Thuja occidentalis (yellow ribbon; northern white cedar) – native to eastern Canada and much of the north-central and northeastern United States
- Thuja plicata (western red cedar) – native to the Pacific Northwest of North America

=== Hedgerow trees ===
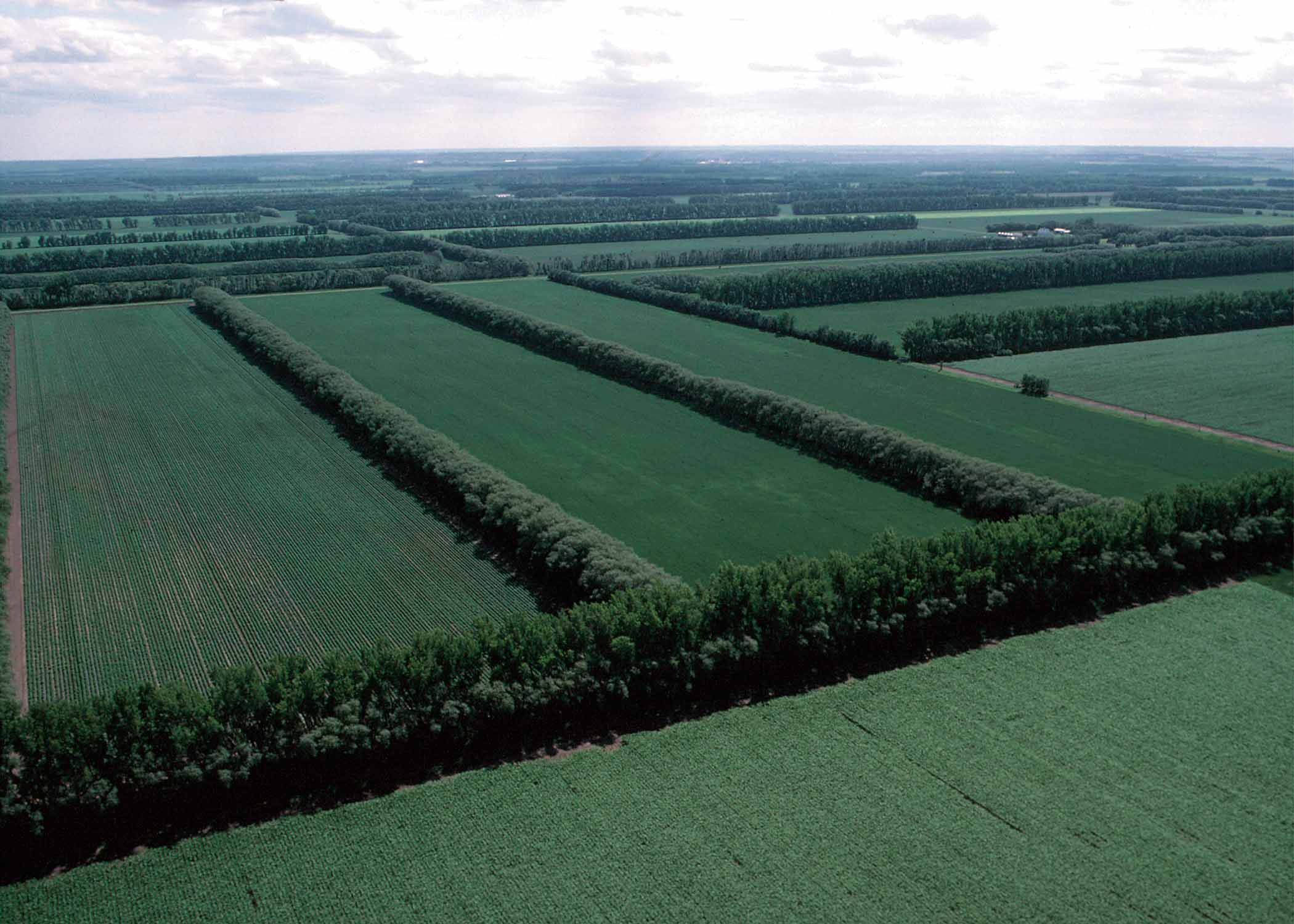
Hedgerows between fields in North Dakota

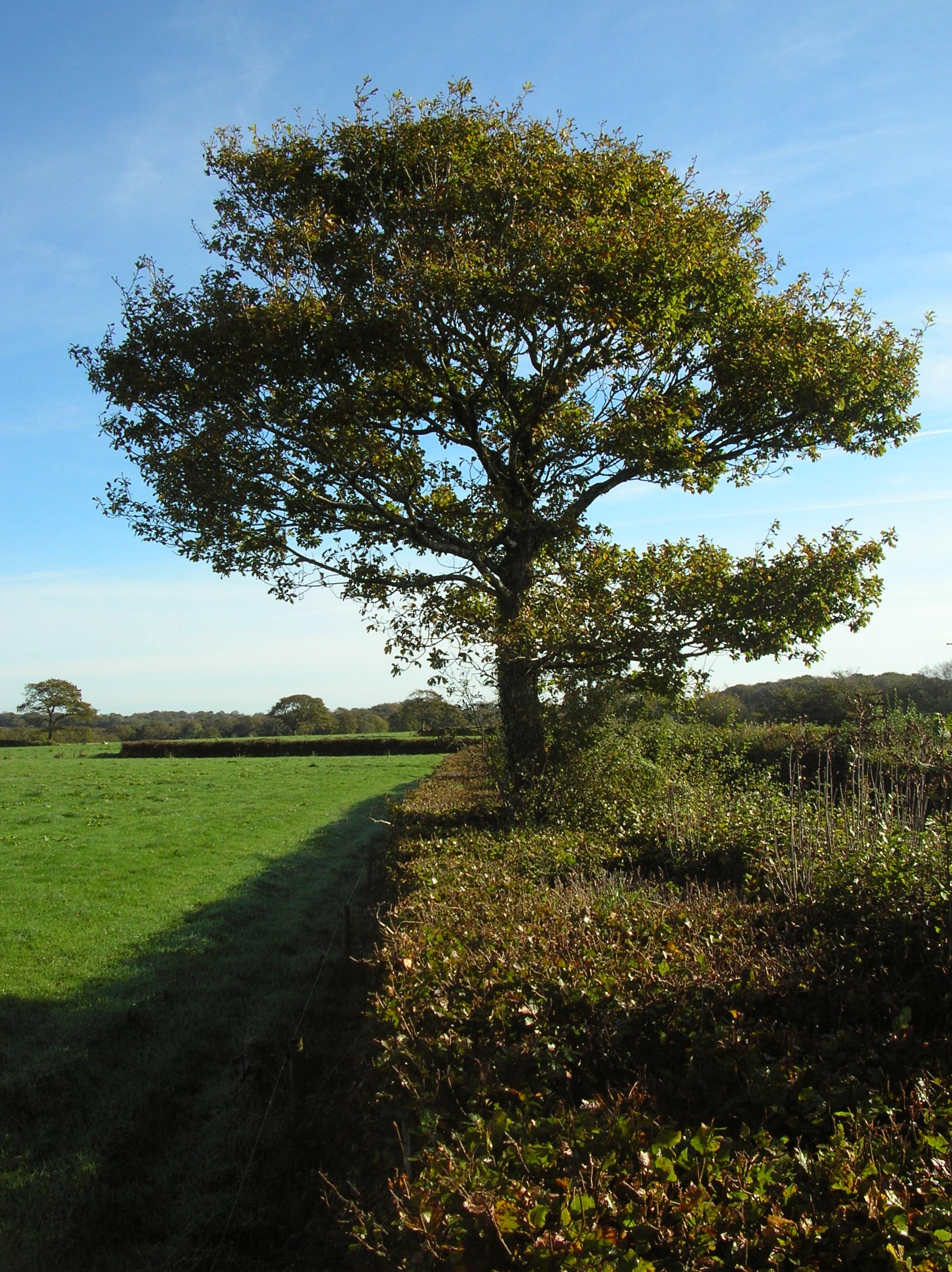
Oak and beech hedges are common in Great Britain

Hedgerow trees are trees that grow in hedgerows but have been allowed to reach their full height and width. There are thought to be around 1.8 million hedgerow trees in Britain (counting only those whose canopies do not touch others) with perhaps 98% of these being in England and Wales. Hedgerow trees are both an important part of the English landscape and valuable habitats for wildlife. Many hedgerow trees are veteran trees and therefore of great wildlife interest.

The most common species are English oak (Quercus robur) and ash (Fraxinus excelsior), though in the past field elm (Ulmus minor 'Atinia') would also have been common. Around 20 million elm trees, most of them hedgerow trees, were felled or died through Dutch elm disease in the late 1960s. Many other species are used, notably including common beech (Fagus sylvatica) and various nut and fruit trees.

The age structure of British hedgerow trees is old because the number of new trees is not sufficient to replace the number of trees that are lost through age or disease.

New trees can be established by planting but it is generally more successful to leave standard trees behind when laying hedges. Trees should be left at no closer than 10 metres (33 ft) apart and the distances should vary so as to create a more natural landscape. The distance allows the young trees to develop full crowns without competing or producing too much shade.

It is suggested that hedgerow trees cause gaps in hedges but it has been found that cutting some lower branches off lets sufficient light through to the hedge below to allow it to grow.

== Importance of hedgerows ==
Hedges are recognised as part of a cultural heritage and historical record and for their great value to wildlife and the landscape. Increasingly, they are valued too for the major role they have to play in preventing soil loss and reducing pollution, and for their potential to regulate water supply and to reduce flooding. There is increased earthworm diversity in the soils under hedgerows which also help to store organic carbon and support distinct communities of arbuscular mycorrhizal (AM) fungi.

In addition to maintaining the health of the environment, hedgerows also play a huge role in providing shelter for smaller animals like birds and insects. A recent study by Emma Coulthard mentioned the possibility that hedgerows may act as guides for moths, like Acronicta rumicis, when flying from one location to another. As moths are nocturnal, it is highly unlikely that they use visual aids as guides, but rather are following sensory or olfactory markers on the hedgerows. Larkin et al. 2013 find 100% of northwest European farms have hedges, providing 43% of the wildlife habitat there.

Historically, hedges were used as a source of firewood, and for providing shelter from wind, rain and sun for crops, farm animals and people. Today, mature hedges' uses include screening unsightly developments.

Hedgerows have been removed as part of the transition of arable land from low-intensity to high-intensity farming. The removal of hedgerows gives larger fields making the sowing and harvesting of crops easier, faster and cheaper, and giving a larger area to grow the crops, increasing yield and profits. As the land within a few metres of hedges is difficult to plough, sow, or spray with herbicides, the land around hedges also typically includes high plant biodiversity. Hedges also serve to stabilise the soil and on slopes help prevent soil creep and leaching of minerals and plant nutrients. Removal thus weakens the soil and leads to erosion. Hedges' roots provide healthy moisture to deep soil; hedges also mitigate water runoff and flooding.

=== United Kingdom ===
Hedgerows have an especially rich history in the British Isles. In the United Kingdom, hedgerows serve as important wildlife corridors, providing shelter from predators. They also serve as a habitat for butterflies and other animals—ecologist Rob Wolton documented over 2,000 different species over two years within a single 90-meter hedge.

Hedgerow removal has been occurring in the UK since World War I as technology made intensive farming possible, and the increasing population demanded more food from the land. Hedge removal was subsidised following World War II; in the following years, the amount of hedgerow in the UK greatly decreased. Per The Economist:

... since the 1950s over half [of hedgerows] have vanished. Many were removed to make bigger fields for crops. Others were neglected, growing into spindly trees. This not only altered the landscape, but also forced many critters from their nests.

Over time, the British government moved to protect hedgerows. According to The Economist, "Hedges—and their inhabitants—have been among the few winners of Brexit"; with independent farm policy, the government has increasingly compensated farmers for providing public goods such as maintaining hedges, with farmers being "paid £70m for tending to hedgerows in 2024, up from £26m the year before."

=== Dating ===
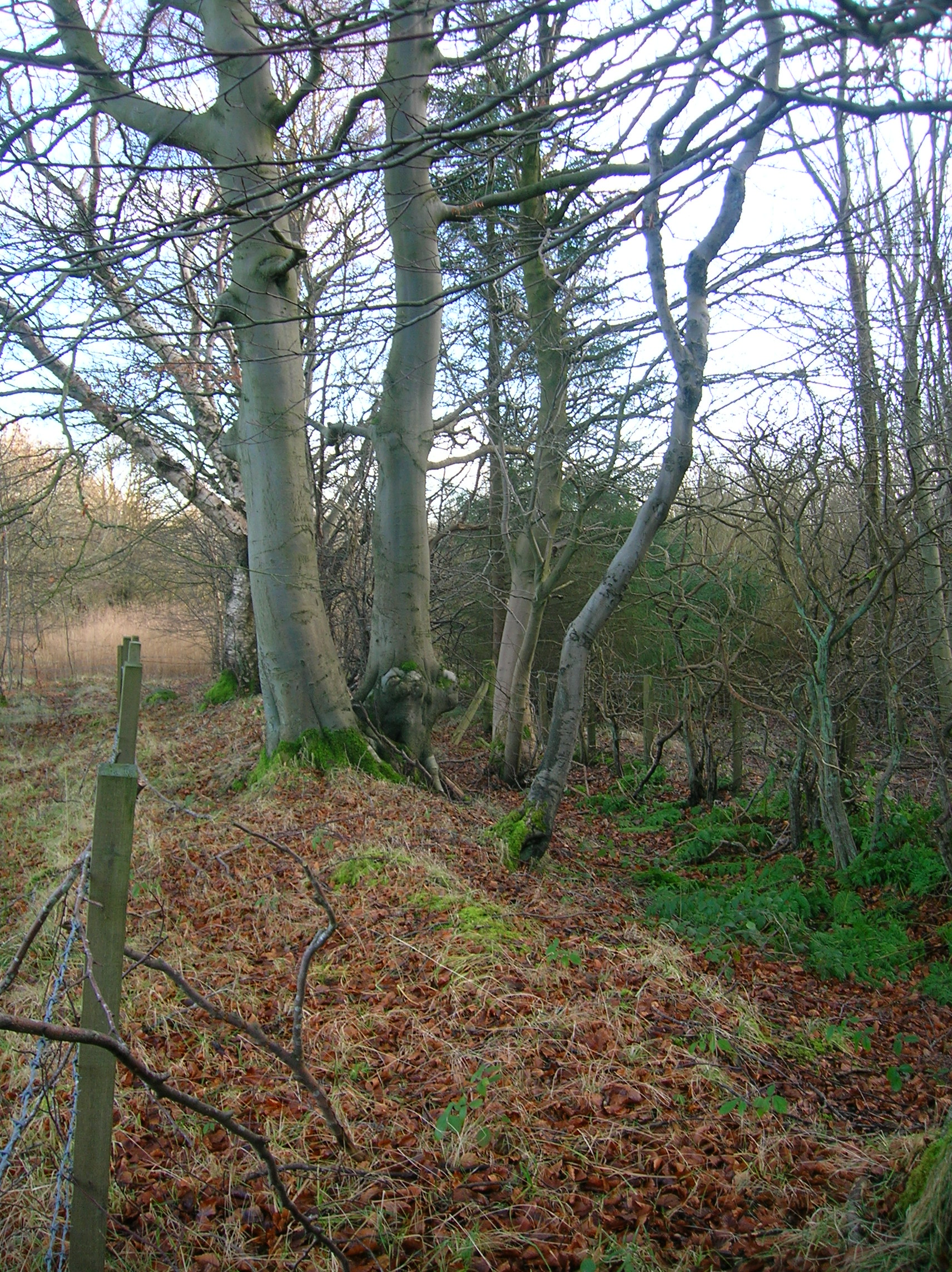
Beech planted on a march dyke (boundary hedge) of the 18th century.

Hedges that have existed for hundreds of years are colonised by additional species. This may be useful as a means of determining the age of the hedge. Hooper's rule (or Hooper's law, named after Dr. Max Hooper) is based on ecological data obtained from hedges of known age, and suggests that the age of a hedge can be roughly estimated by counting the number of woody species in a thirty-yard section and multiplying by 110 years.

Max Hooper published his original formula in the book Hedges in 1974. This method is only a rule of thumb, and can be off by a couple of centuries; it should always be backed up by documentary evidence, if possible, and take into account other factors. Caveats include the fact that planted hedgerows, hedgerows with elm, and hedgerows in the north of England tend not to follow the rule as closely. The formula also does not work on hedges more than a thousand years old.

Hooper's scheme is important not least for its potential use in determining what an important hedgerow is, given their protection in The Hedgerows Regulations (1997; No. 1160) of the Department of the Environment, based on age and other factors.

== Hedge laying ==
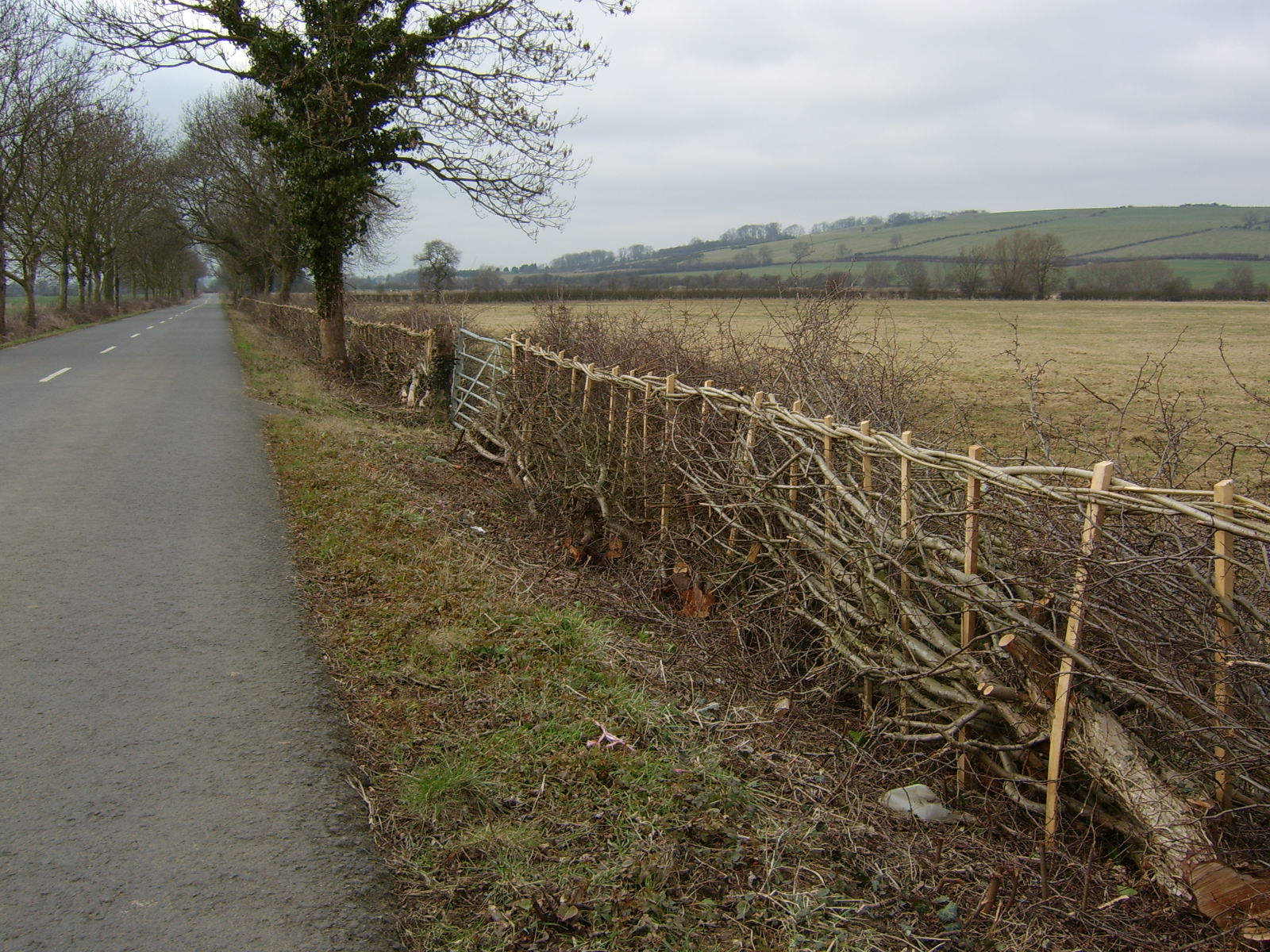
A stretch of newly laid traditional hedging near Middleton, Northamptonshire

If hedges are not maintained and trimmed regularly, gaps tend to form at the base over many years. In essence, hedgelaying consists of cutting most of the way through the stem of each plant near the base, bending it over and interweaving or pleaching it between wooden stakes. This also encourages new growth from the base of each plant. Originally, the main purpose of hedgelaying was to ensure the hedge remained stock-proof. Some side branches were also removed and used as firewood.

The maintenance and laying of hedges to form an impenetrable barrier for farm animals is a skilled art. In Britain there are many local hedgelaying traditions, each with a distinct style. Hedges are still being laid today not only for aesthetic and functional purposes but also for their ecological role in helping wildlife and protecting against soil erosion.

=== Hedge trimming ===
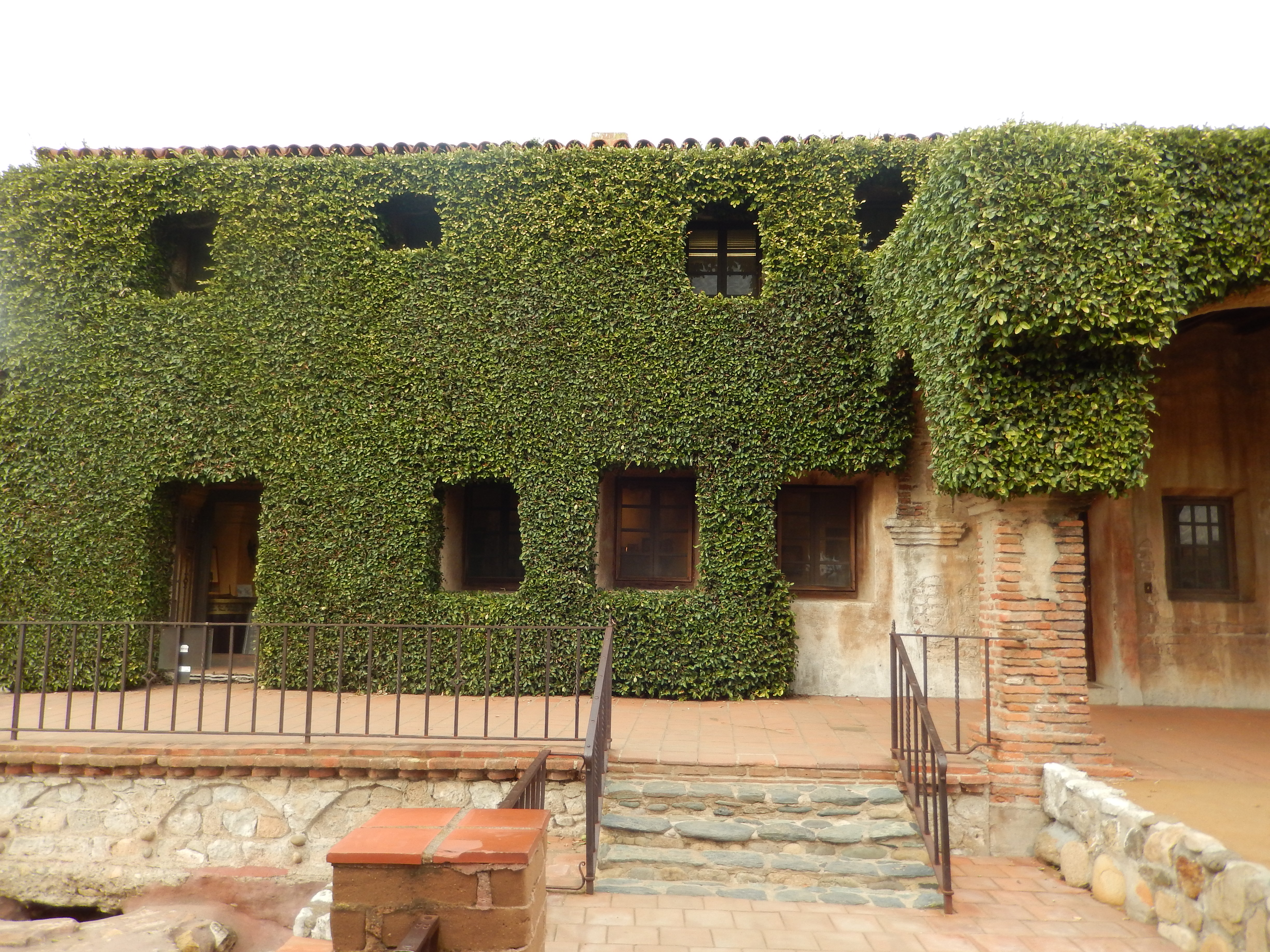
Trimmed hedges at Mission San Juan Capistrano in California

An alternative to hedge laying is trimming using a tractor-mounted flail cutter or circular saw, or a hedge trimmer. The height of the cutting can be increased a little every year. Trimming a hedge helps to promote bushy growth. If a flail cutter is used, then the flail must be kept sharp to ensure that the cutting is effective on the hedge. The disadvantage of this is that the hedge species takes a number of years before it will flower again and subsequently bear fruit for wildlife and people. If the hedge is trimmed repeatedly at the same height, a 'hard knuckle' will start to form at that height – similar to the shape of a pollarded tree. Additionally, hedge trimming causes habitat destruction to species like the small eggar moth which spend nearly their entire life cycle in blackthorn and hawthorn hedgerow. This has led to a decline in the moth's population. It is now nationally scarce in Britain.

=== General hedge management ===
A 'hedgerow management' scale has been devised by an organisation called Hedgelink UK ranging from 1 to 10. '1' describes the action to take for a heavily over trimmed hedge, '5' is a healthy dense hedgerow more than 2 metres in height, and '10' is a hedge that has not been managed at all and has become a line of trees.

The RSPB suggest that hedges in Britain not be cut between March and August. This is to protect nesting birds, which are protected by law.

=== Coppicing ===
The techniques of coppicing and hard pollarding can be used to rejuvenate a hedge where hedge laying is not appropriate.

== Types ==
=== Instant hedge ===
The term instant hedge has become known since early this century for hedging plants that are planted collectively in such a way as to form a mature hedge from the moment they are planted together, with a height of at least 1.2 metres. They are usually created from hedging elements or individual plants which means very few are actually hedges from the start, as the plants need time to grow and entwine to form a real hedge.

An example of an instant hedge can be seen at the Elveden Hall Estate in East Anglia, where fields of hedges can be seen growing in cultivated rows, since 1998. The development of this type of mature hedge has led to such products being specified by landscape architects, garden designers, property developers, insurance companies, sports clubs, schools and local councils, as well as many private home owners. Demand has also increased from planning authorities in specifying to developers that mature hedges are planted rather than just whips (a slender, unbranched shoot or plant).

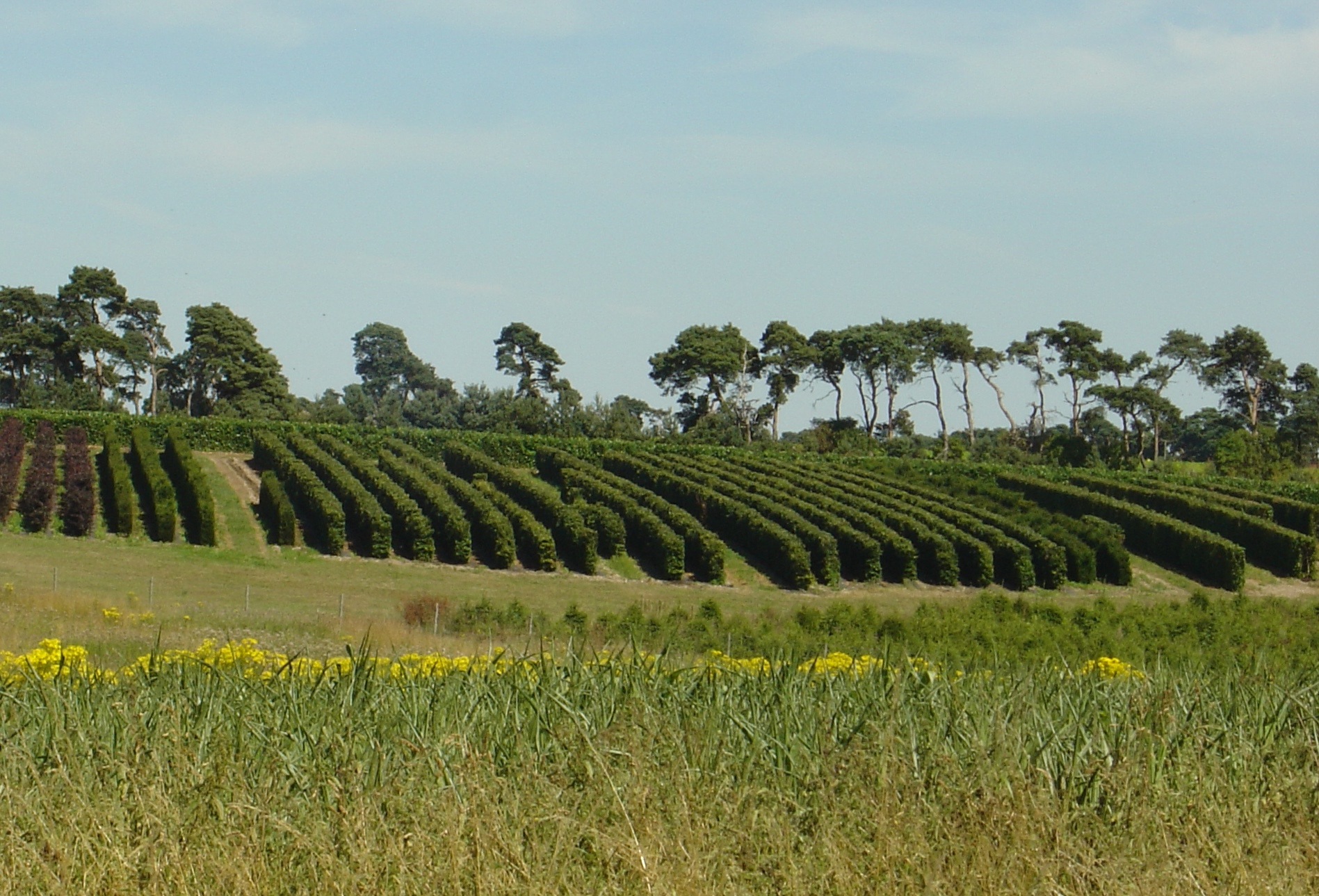
Instant hedge growing in fields at Elveden Estate

A 'real' instant hedge could be defined as having a managed root growth system allowing the hedge to be sold with a continuous rootstrips (rather than individual plants) which then enables year-round planting. During its circa 8-year production time, all stock should be irrigated, clipped and treated with controlled-release nutrients to optimise health.

=== Quickset hedge ===
A quickset hedge is a type of hedge created by planting live whitethorn (common hawthorn) cuttings directly into the earth (hazel does not sprout from cuttings). Once planted, these cuttings root and form new plants, creating a dense barrier. The technique is ancient, and the term quickset hedge is first recorded in 1484. The word quick in the name refers to the fact that the cuttings are living (as in "the quick and the dead"), and not to the speed at which the hedge grows, although it will establish quite rapidly. An alternative meaning of quickset hedging is any hedge formed of living plants or of living plants combined with a fence. The technique of quicksetting can also be used for many other shrubs and trees.

=== Devon hedge ===
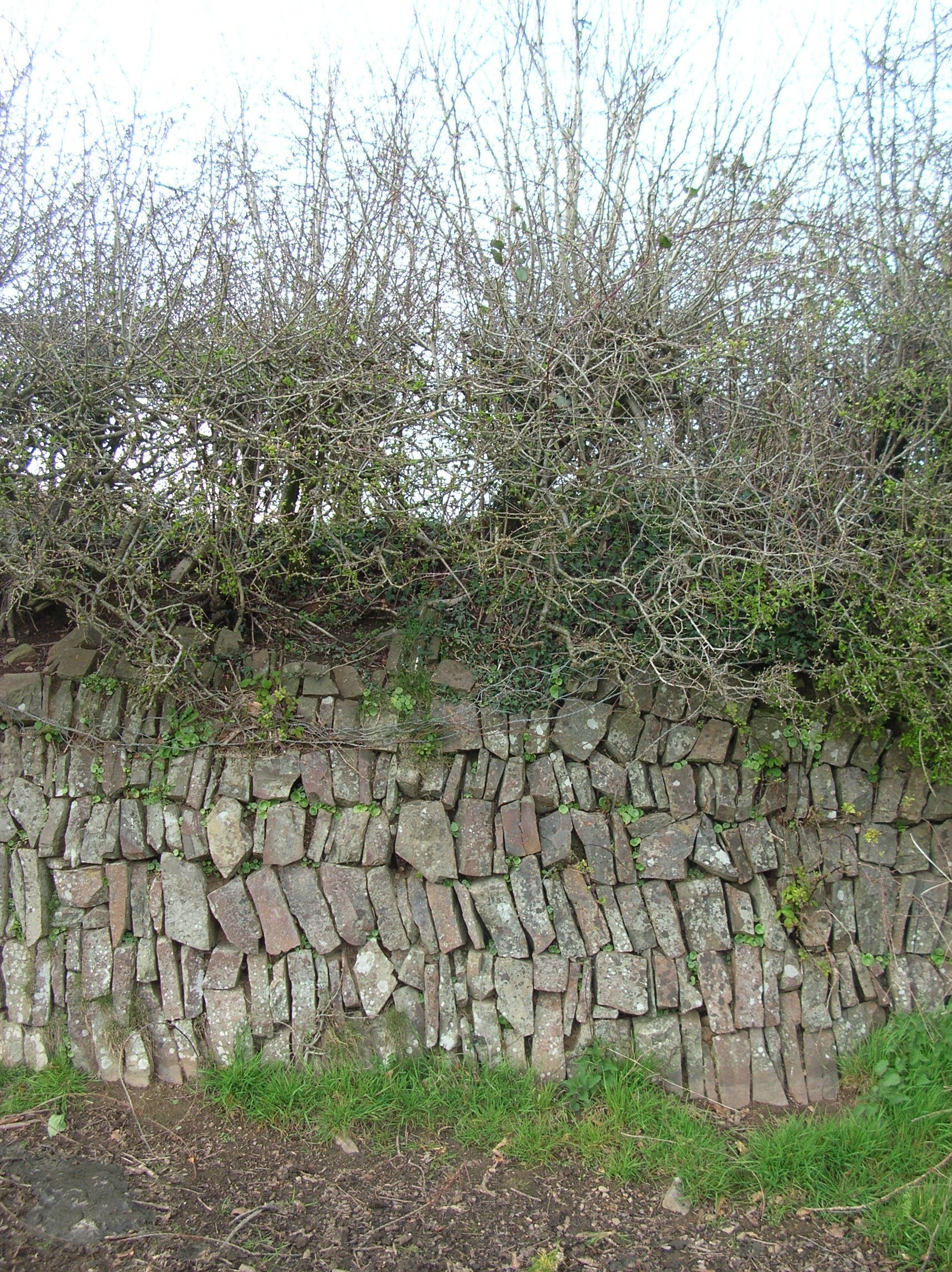
A traditional stone-faced Devon hedge at Beaford, with stones placed on edge

A Devon hedge is an earth bank topped with shrubs. The bank may be faced with turf or stone. When stone-faced, the stones are generally placed on edge, often laid flat around gateways.

A quarter of Devon's hedges are thought to be over 800 years old. There are approximately 33,000 miles (53,000 km) of Devon hedge, which is more than any other county. Traditional farming throughout the county has meant that fewer Devon hedges have been removed than elsewhere.

Devon hedges are particularly important for wildlife habitat. Around 20% of the UK's species-rich hedges occur within Devon. Over 600 species of flowering plants, 1500 species of insects, 65 species of birds and 20 species of mammals have been recorded living or feeding in Devon hedges.

Hedge laying in Devon is usually referred to as steeping and involves cutting and laying steepers (the stems) along the top of the bank and securing them with crooks (forked sticks).

=== Cornish hedge ===
A Cornish hedge is an earth bank with stones. It normally consists of large stone blocks constructed either side of a narrow earth bank, and held in place with interlocking stones. The neat rows of square stones at the top are called "edgers". The top of the hedge is planted with grass turf.

Sometimes hedging plants or trees are planted on the hedge to increase its windbreaking height. A rich flora develops over the lifespan of a Cornish hedge. The Cornish hedge contributes to the distinctive field-pattern of the Cornish landscape and its semi-natural wildlife habitat. There are about 30,000 miles (48,000 km) of hedges in Cornwall today.

Hedges suffer from the effects of tree roots, burrowing rabbits, rain, wind, farm animals and people. How often repairs are needed depends on how well the hedge was built, its stone, and what has happened to it since it was last repaired. Typically a hedge needs a cycle of repair every 150 years or so, or less often if it is fenced. Building new hedges, and repairing existing hedges, is a skilled craft, and there are professional hedgers in Cornwall. The Cornish Hedge Research and Education Group (CHREG) supports the development of traditional skills and works with Cornwall Council, FWAG (Farming and Wildlife Advisory Group), Stone Academy Bodmin, Cornwall AONB, Country Trust and professional hedgers to ensure the future of Cornish Hedges in the landscape.

== In gardening ==
Hedges, both clipped and unclipped, are often used as ornament in the layout of gardens. Typical woody plants for clipped hedges include privet, hawthorn, beech, yew, leyland cypress, hemlock, arborvitae, barberry, box, holly, oleander, lavender, among others. An early 20th-century fashion was for tapestry hedges, using a mix of golden, green and glaucous dwarf conifers, or beech and copper beech. Unclipped hedges take up more space, generally at a premium in modern gardens, but compensate by flowering. Rosa multiflora is widely used as a dense hedge along the central reservation of dual-carriageway roads, such as parkways in the United States. In mild climates, more exotic flowering hedges are formed, using Ceanothus, Hibiscus, Camellia, orange jessamine (Murraya paniculata), or lillypilly (Syzygium species). It is also possible to prepare really nice and dense hedge from other deciduous plants, however they do not have decorative flowers as the bushes mentioned before.

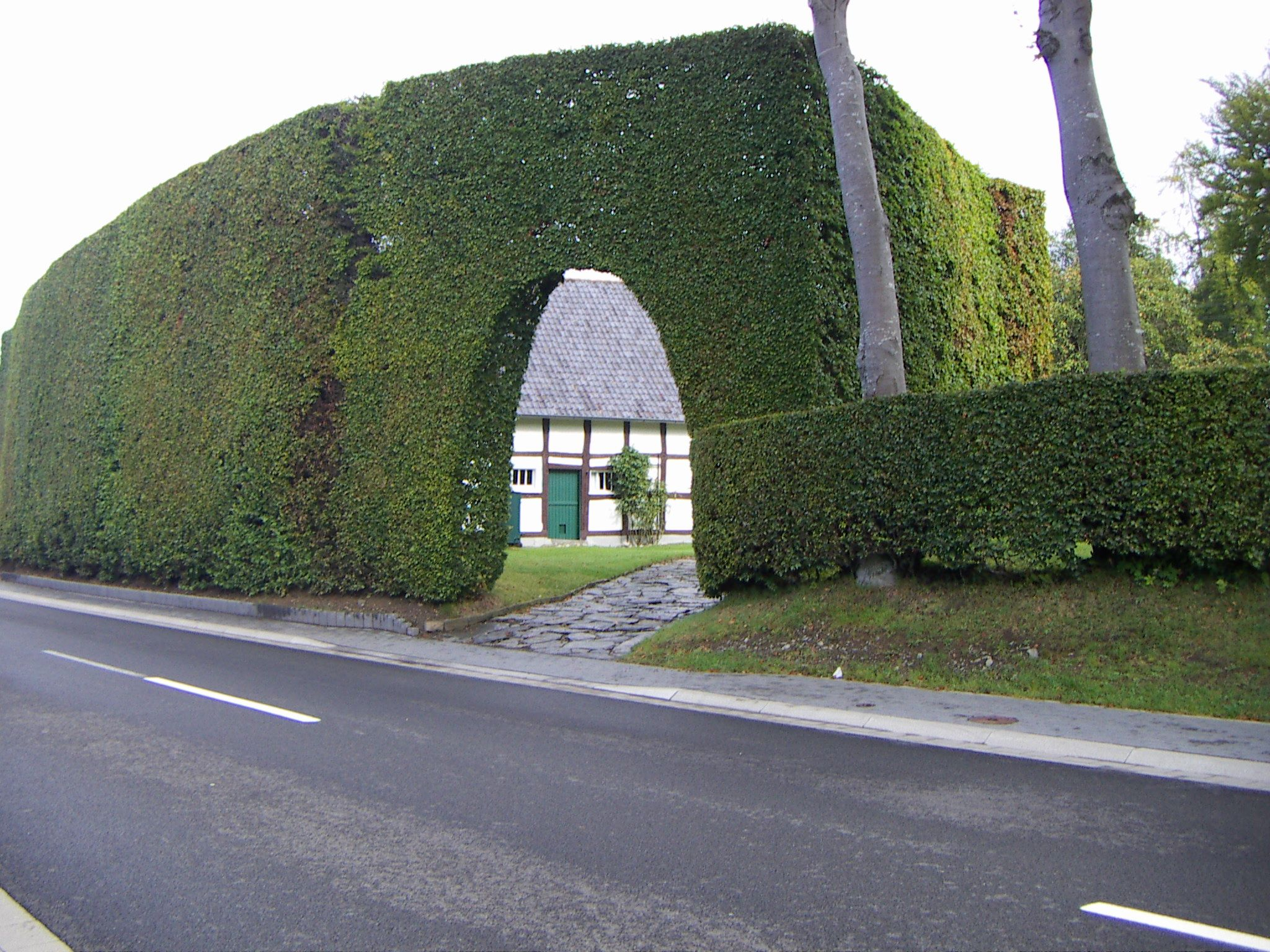
A clipped beech hedge in Germany, grown as high as a house for privacy and to serve as a windbreak

Hedges of clipped trees forming avenues are a feature of 16th-century Italian gardens such as the Boboli Gardens in Florence, and of formal French gardens in the manner of André Le Nôtre, e.g. in the Gardens of Versailles, where they surround bosquets or areas formalized woodland. The English version of this was the wilderness, normal in large gardens until the English landscape garden style and the rise of the shrubbery began to sweep them away from about 1750. The 'hedge on stilts' of clipped hornbeams at Hidcote Manor Garden, Gloucestershire, is famous and has sometimes been imitated; it is fact a standard French and Italian style of the bosquet.

Hedges below knee height are generally thought of as borders. Elaborately shaped and interlaced borders forming knot gardens or parterres were fashionable in Europe during the 16th and early 17th centuries. Generally they were appreciated from a raised position, either the windows of a house, or a terrace.

Clipped hedges above eye level may be laid out in the form of a labyrinth or garden maze. Few such mazes survived the change of fashion towards more naturalistic plantings in the 18th and 19th centuries, but many were replanted in 20th-century restorations of older gardens. An example is behind the Governor's Palace, Colonial Williamsburg, Virginia.

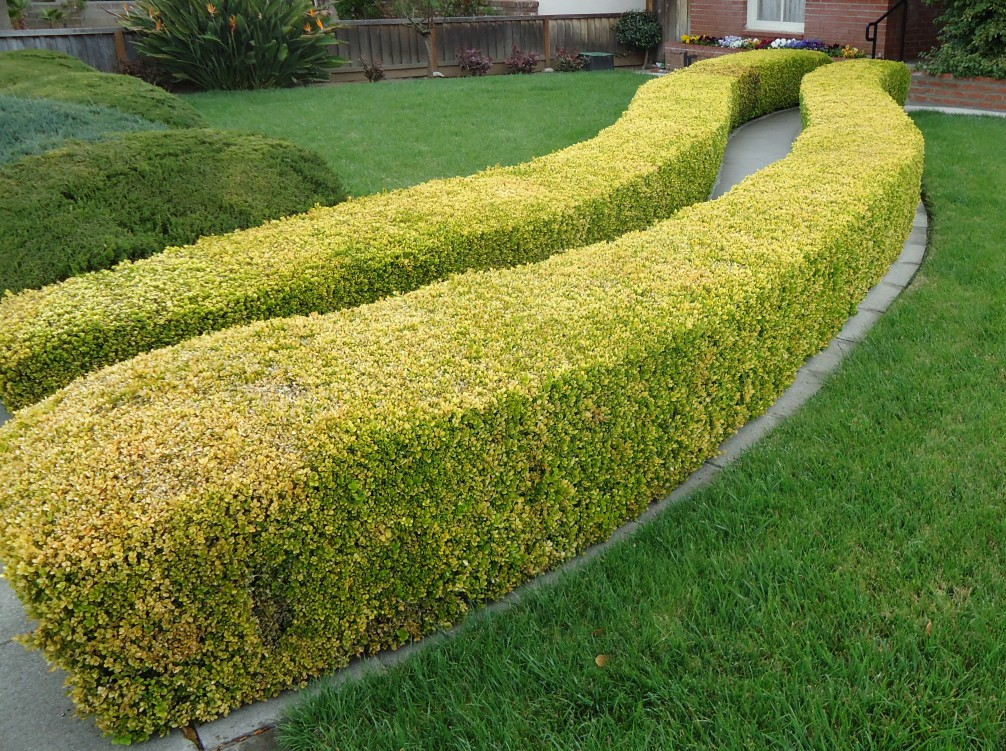
Hedges trimmed in a California lawn

Hedges and pruning can both be used to enhance a garden's privacy, as a buffer to visual pollution and to hide fences. A hedge can be aesthetically pleasing, as in a tapestry hedge, where alternate species are planted at regular intervals to present different colours or textures.

In America, fences have always been more common than hedges to mark garden boundaries. The English radical William Cobbett was already complaining about this in 1819:

And why should America not possess this most beautiful and useful plant [the Haw-Thorn]? She has English gew-gaws, English Play-Actors, English Cards and English Dice and Billiards; English fooleries and English vices enough in all conscience; and why not English Hedges, instead of post-and-rail and board fences? If, instead of these steril-looking and cheerless enclosures the gardens and meadows and fields, in the neighbourhood of New York and other cities and towns, were divided by quick-set hedges, what a difference would the alteration make in the look, and in the real value too, of those gardens, meadows and fields!

== Regulation ==
In the US, some local jurisdictions may strictly regulate the placement or height of a hedge, such as the case where a Palo Alto city resident was arrested for allowing her xylosma hedge to grow above two feet.

In the UK the owner of a large hedge that is adversely affecting the reasonable enjoyment of neighbouring domestic property can be made to reduce it in height. In England and Wales, high hedges are covered under Part 8 of the Anti-Social Behaviour Act 2003. For a hedge to qualify for reduction, it must be made up wholly or mainly of a line of two or more evergreen or semi-evergreen trees or shrubs and be over 2 metres high. To some degree, it must be a barrier to light or access. It must be adversely affecting the complainant's reasonable enjoyment of their domestic property (either their house or garden) because of its height. Later legislation with similar effect was introduced in Northern Ireland, Isle of Man and Scotland.

== Significant hedges ==
The 19th-century Great Hedge of India was probably the largest example of a hedge used as a barrier. It was planted and used to collect taxes by the British.

The Willow Palisade, constructed during the early Qing dynasty (17th century) to control people's movement and to collect taxes on ginseng and timber in southern Manchuria, also had hedge-like features. The palisade included two dikes and a moat between them, the dikes topped by rows of willow trees, tied to one another with their branches. Gradually decaying throughout the late 18th and 19th centuries, the palisade disappeared in the early 20th century, its remaining willows cut during the Russo-Japanese War of 1904–1905 by the two countries' soldiers.

The Meikleour Beech Hedges, located near Meikleour in Scotland, are noted in the Guinness World Records as the tallest and longest hedge on earth, reaching 30 metres (98 ft) in height and 530 metres (0.33 mi) in length. The beech trees were planted in 1745 by Jean Mercer on the Marquess of Lansdowne's Meikleour estate.

The hedgerows and sunken lanes in Normandy, France, posed a problem to Allied tanks after Operation Overlord, the invasion of Europe, in World War 2. The hedgerows prevented the tanks from freely moving about the area, until they were fitted with tusks.

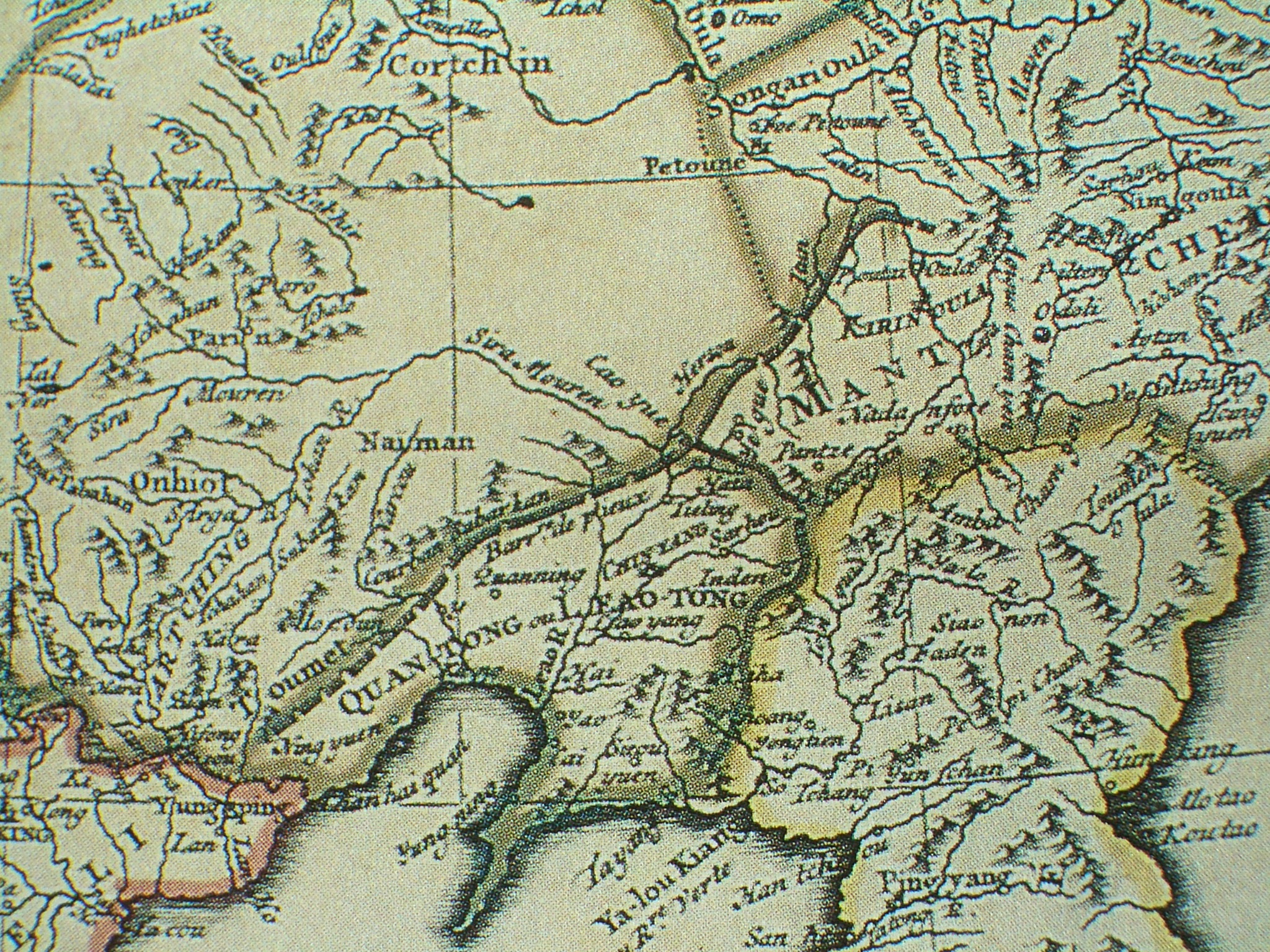
An early-18th-century French Jesuit map showing the Willow Palisade (Barriere de Pieux) surrounding Liaodong (Leao-tong), with an additional branch going northeast, to separate the Mongols and the Manchus

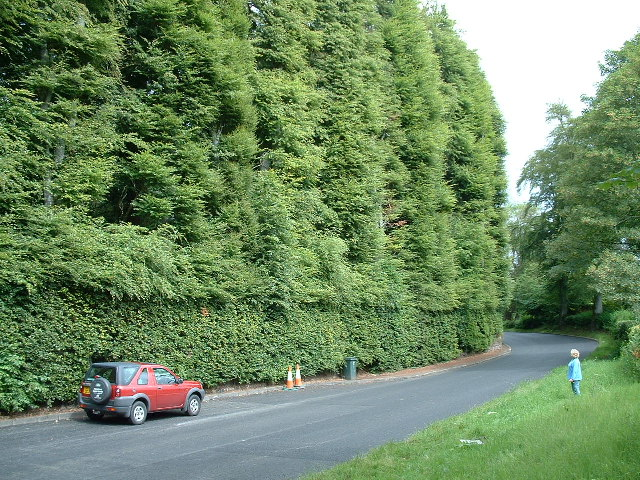
Meikleour Beech Hedges

== See also ==
- Bocage
- Cactus fence
- Dead hedge
- Drovers' road
- Enclosure
- Green wall
- Hedgehog
- Shelterbelt
- Topiary
