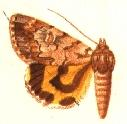

Scientific classification
- Kingdom: Animalia
- Phylum: Arthropoda
- Class: Insecta
- Order: Lepidoptera
- Superfamily: Noctuoidea
- Family: Erebidae
- Genus: Catocala
- Species: C. praeclara

Binomial name
- Catocala praeclara Grote & Robinson, 1866

= Catocala praeclara =

Praeclara underwing

Species of moth

Catocala praeclara, the praeclara underwing, is a moth of the family Erebidae. The species was first described by Augustus Radcliffe Grote and Coleman Townsend Robinson in 1866. It is found in North America from Nova Scotia west to south-eastern Alberta, south to Florida and Kansas.

The wingspan is 38–50 mm. Adults are on wing from August to September in one generation depending on the location.

The larvae feed on Amelanchier, Crataegus species (including Crataegus calpodendron), Photinia species (including Photinia prunifolia, and Photinia melanocarpa).

== Subspecies ==
- Catocala praeclara praeclara
- Catocala praeclara manitoba Beutenmüller, 1908
- Catocala praeclara charlottae Brou, 1988
