= Chinese photinia =

Chinese photinia is a common name for several plants and may refer to:

- Photinia serratifolia
- Photinia davidiana
