= Photinia anlungensis =

Scientific classification
- Kingdom: Plantae
- Clade: Tracheophytes
- Clade: Angiosperms
- Clade: Eudicots
- Clade: Rosids
- Order: Rosales
- Family: Rosaceae
- Genus: Photinia
- Species: P. anlungensis

Binomial name
- Photinia anlungensis T.T.Yu

Species of flowering plant

Photinia anlungensis (Chinese: 安龙石楠) is a flower species in the family Rosaceae. It is found in China.
