= Photinia zhejiangensis =

Scientific classification
- Kingdom: Plantae
- Clade: Tracheophytes
- Clade: Angiosperms
- Clade: Eudicots
- Clade: Rosids
- Order: Rosales
- Family: Rosaceae
- Genus: Photinia
- Species: P. zhejiangensis

Binomial name
- Photinia zhejiangensis P.L.Chiu

Species of flowering plant

Photinia zhejiangensis is a member of the Rosaceae family whose native range is Zhejiang China. It is an evergreen shrub that grows 1-1.5m tall.
