= Photinia lochengensis =

Scientific classification
- Kingdom: Plantae
- Clade: Tracheophytes
- Clade: Angiosperms
- Clade: Eudicots
- Clade: Rosids
- Order: Rosales
- Family: Rosaceae
- Genus: Photinia
- Species: P. lochengensis

Binomial name
- Photinia lochengensis T.T.Yu

Synonyms
- Pyrus lochengensis (T.T.Yu) M.F.Fay & Christenh.

Species of flowering plant

Photinia lochengensis, also known as luo cheng shi nan (Chinese: 罗城石楠), is a species of plant in the family Rosaceae. It was described by Chinese botanist Te-Tsun Yu in 1963 and is native to China.
