= Photinia lanuginosa =

Scientific classification
- Kingdom: Plantae
- Clade: Embryophytes
- Clade: Tracheophytes
- Clade: Spermatophytes
- Clade: Angiosperms
- Clade: Eudicots
- Clade: Rosids
- Order: Rosales
- Family: Rosaceae
- Genus: Photinia
- Species: P. lanuginosa

Binomial name
- Photinia lanuginosa T.T.Yu

Species of flowering plant

Photinia lanuginosa is a woody shrub species in the family Rosaceae. It is found only in the Hunan province of China.
