= Photinia lasiopetala =

Conservation status
- Vulnerable (IUCN 2.3)

Scientific classification
- Kingdom: Plantae
- Clade: Tracheophytes
- Clade: Angiosperms
- Clade: Eudicots
- Clade: Rosids
- Order: Rosales
- Family: Rosaceae
- Genus: Photinia
- Species: P. lasiopetala

Binomial name
- Photinia lasiopetala Hayata

Species of flowering plant

Photinia lasiopetala is a species of flowering plant in the family Rosaceae. It is endemic to Taiwan. It is threatened by habitat loss.
