= Photinia megaphylla =

Scientific classification
- Kingdom: Plantae
- Clade: Tracheophytes
- Clade: Angiosperms
- Clade: Eudicots
- Clade: Rosids
- Order: Rosales
- Family: Rosaceae
- Genus: Photinia
- Species: P. megaphylla

Binomial name
- Photinia megaphylla T.T.Yu & L.T.Lu

Species of flowering plant

Photinia megaphylla is a species in the family Rosaceae. It is found in Tibet. The type locality is Mêdog Xian, Xizang, China, at an altitude of 1800 metres, where it grows in broad-leaved forest.

== Description ==
Photinia megaphylla is an evergreen shrub to about 3 metres. The leaves are elliptical, up to 27 cm by 12 cm, with up to 25 pairs of veins, and covered with dense brownish fur on the underside. It flowers in May and June.
