= Photinia tushanensis =

Scientific classification
- Kingdom: Plantae
- Clade: Tracheophytes
- Clade: Angiosperms
- Clade: Eudicots
- Clade: Rosids
- Order: Rosales
- Family: Rosaceae
- Genus: Photinia
- Species: P. tushanensis

Binomial name
- Photinia tushanensis T.T.Yu

Species of flowering plant

Photinia tushanensis is a species in the family Rosaceae of flowering plants.
