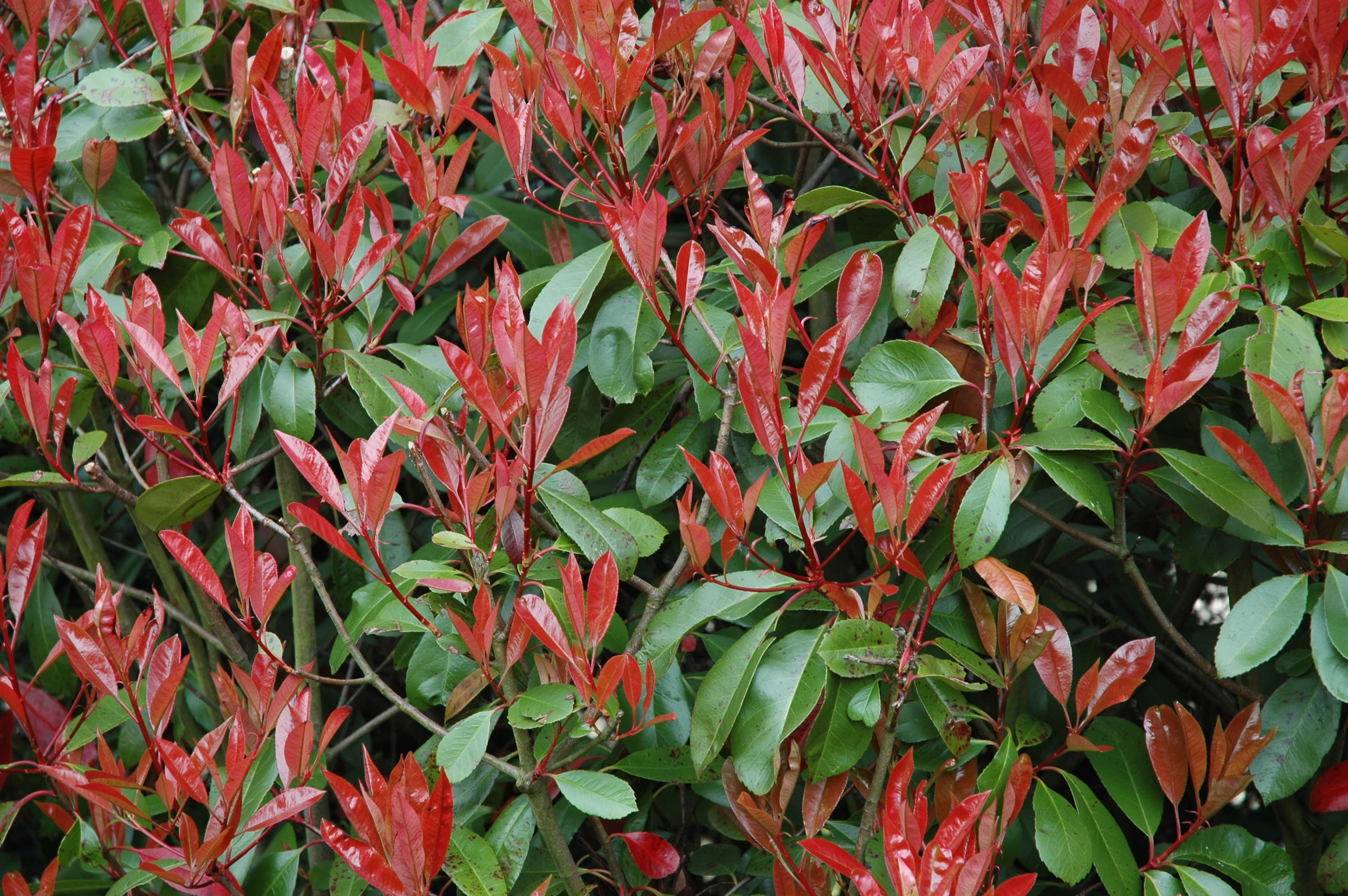

Scientific classification
- Kingdom: Plantae
- Clade: Tracheophytes
- Clade: Angiosperms
- Clade: Eudicots
- Clade: Rosids
- Order: Rosales
- Family: Rosaceae
- Genus: Photinia
- Species: P. × fraseri

Binomial name
- Photinia × fraseri Dress

= Photinia × fraseri =

Species of plant

Photinia × fraseri, known as red tip photinia and Christmas berry, is a nothospecies in the rose family, Rosaceae. It is a hybrid between Photinia glabra and Photinia serratifolia.

== Description ==
It is a compact shrub with an erect habit that can grow into a medium-sized tree. Its evergreen, oval leaves are dark green but crimson red when young, especially in early spring. Its flowers are small, with five petals, united in large white inflorescences. They bloom at the end of spring. It can reach a height of 5 metres and a diameter of 5 metres. It is frost resistant and can withstand temperatures from -5° to -10°.

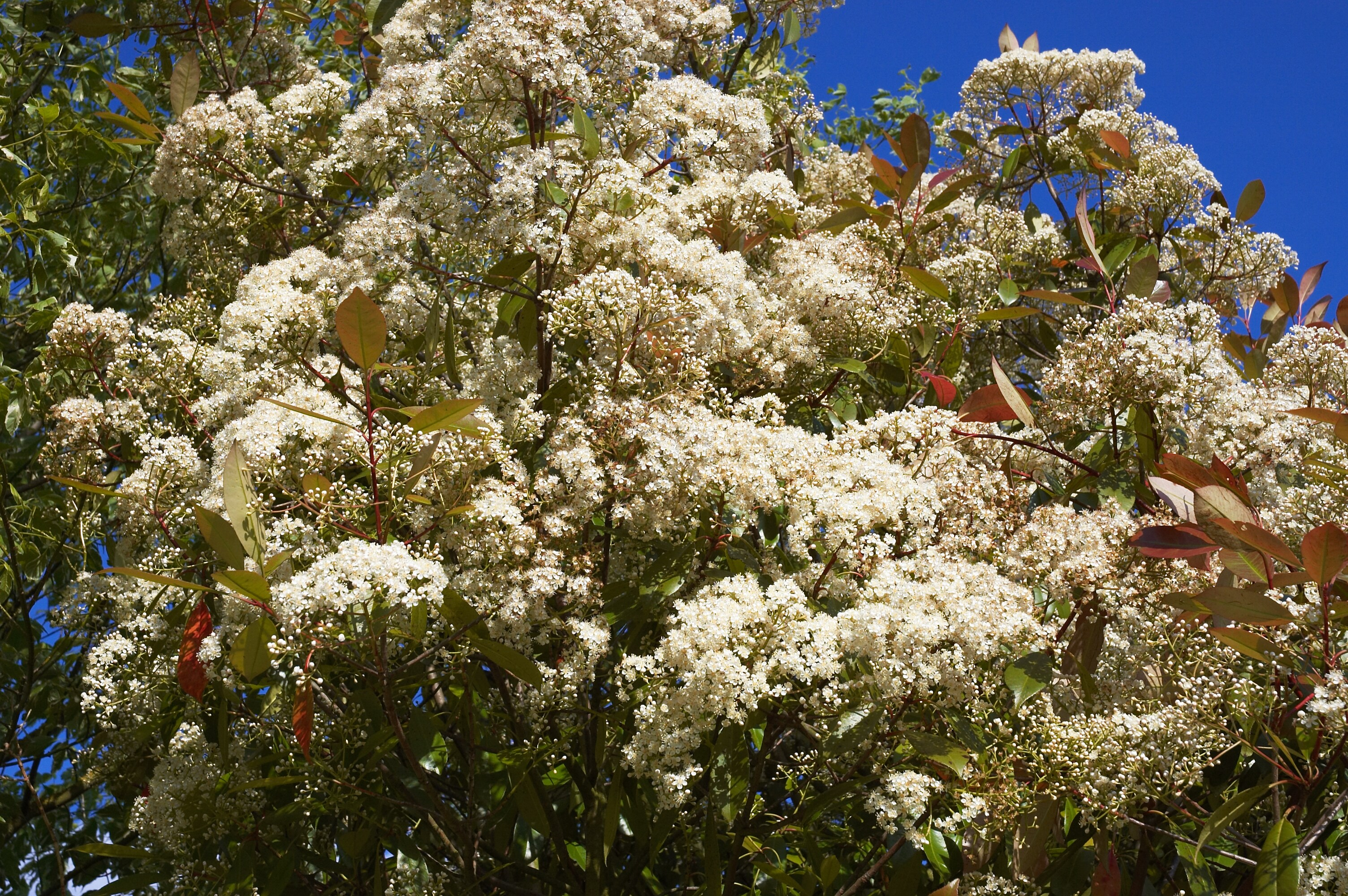
Masses of flowers

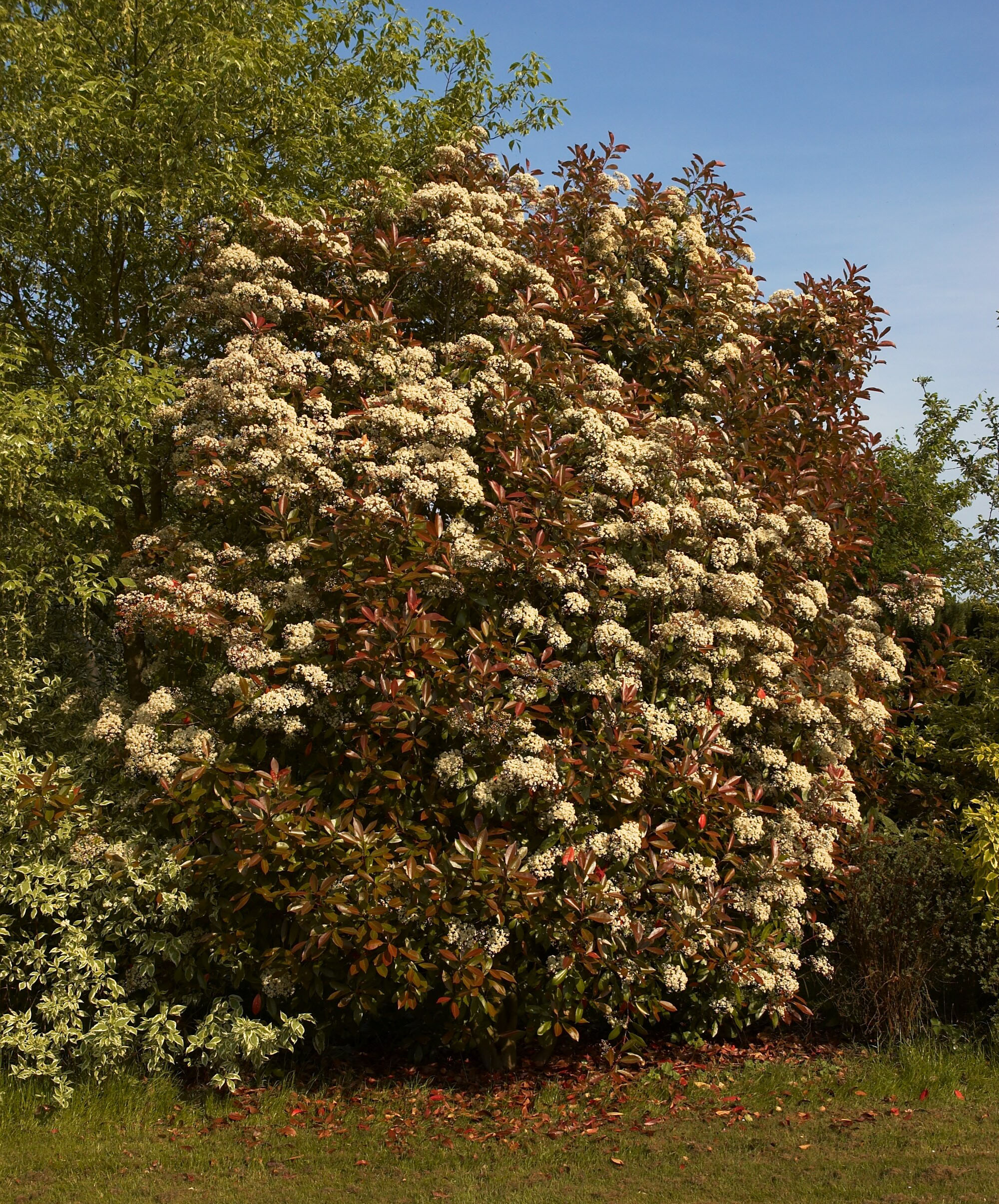
Entire plant

== Cultivation ==
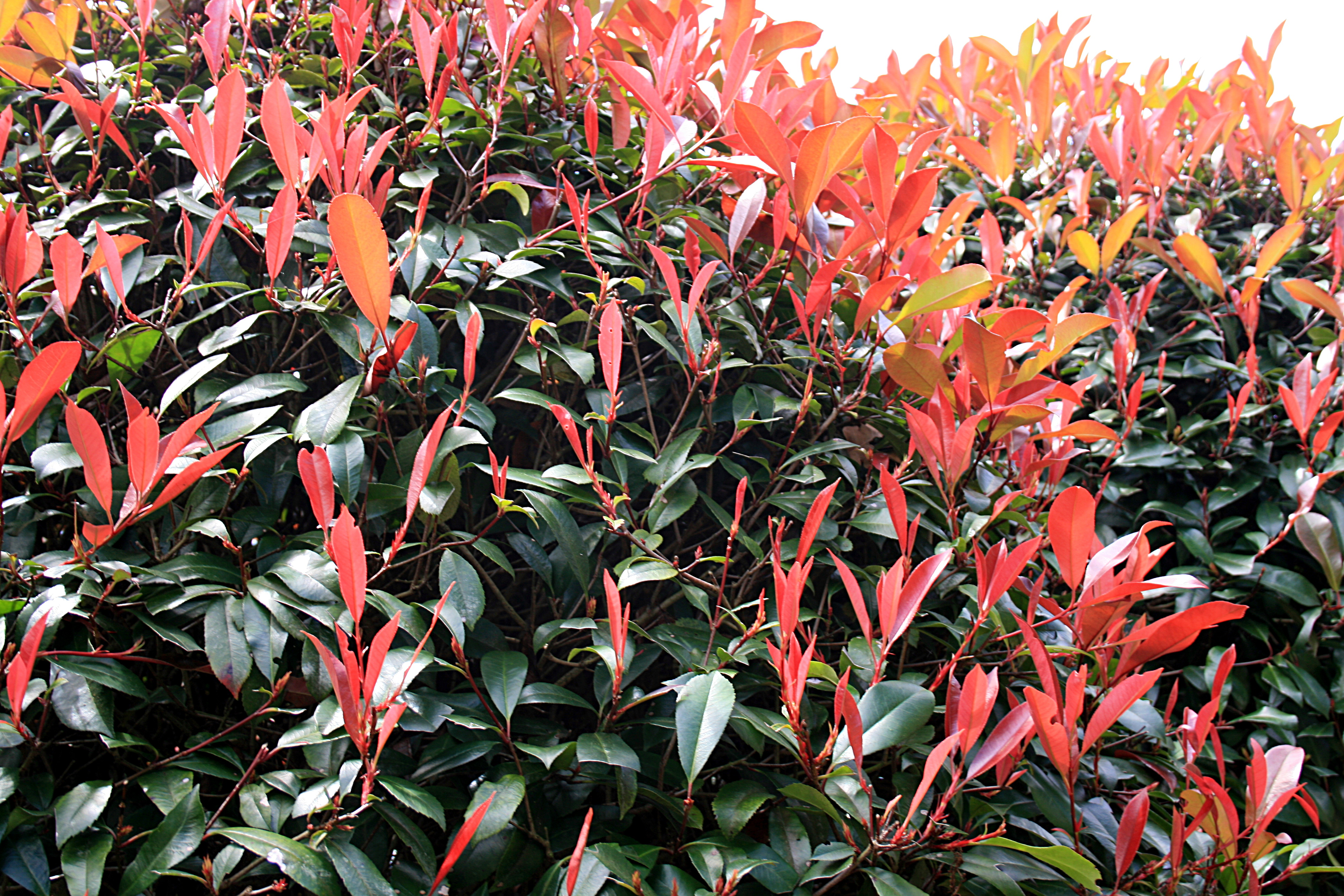
'Red Robin' as a hedge

The shrub tolerates moderate shade and it grows in well drained soils. It should be sheltered from the cold and dry winds of winter. It can be propagated by semi-woody cuttings in summer.

=== Cultivars ===
The hybrid has a number of cultivars, which include (those marked agm have won the Royal Horticultural Society's Award of Garden Merit):

- Photinia × fraseri 'Camilvy'
- Photinia × fraseri 'Curly Fantasy'
- Photinia × fraseri 'Little Red Robin', a plant similar to 'Red Robin', but dwarf in stature with an ultimate height/spread of around 2–3 ft
- Photinia × fraseri 'Pink Marble' or 'Cassini', a newer cultivar with rose-pink tinted new growth and a creamy-white variegated margin on the leaves
- Photinia × fraseri 'Red Robin' - probably the most widely planted of all
- Photinia × fraseri 'Robusta'
- Photinia × fraseri 'Super Hedger' - a newer hybrid with strong upright growth
