= Photinia chihsiniana =

Scientific classification
- Kingdom: Plantae
- Clade: Tracheophytes
- Clade: Angiosperms
- Clade: Eudicots
- Clade: Rosids
- Order: Rosales
- Family: Rosaceae
- Genus: Photinia
- Species: P. chihsiniana

Binomial name
- Photinia chihsiniana Kuan

Synonyms
- Pyrus chihsiniana Kuan

Species of flowering plant

Photinia chihsiniana (Chinese: 临桂石楠) is a species of tree in the family Rosaceae. It is found in Southeast China.
