= Photinia berberidifolia =

Scientific classification
- Kingdom: Plantae
- Clade: Tracheophytes
- Clade: Angiosperms
- Clade: Eudicots
- Clade: Rosids
- Order: Rosales
- Family: Rosaceae
- Genus: Photinia
- Species: P. berberidifolia

Binomial name
- Photinia berberidifolia Rehder & E.H.Wilson

Species of flowering plant

Photinia berberidifolia is a species in the family Rosaceae. It is found in Sichuan, China.
