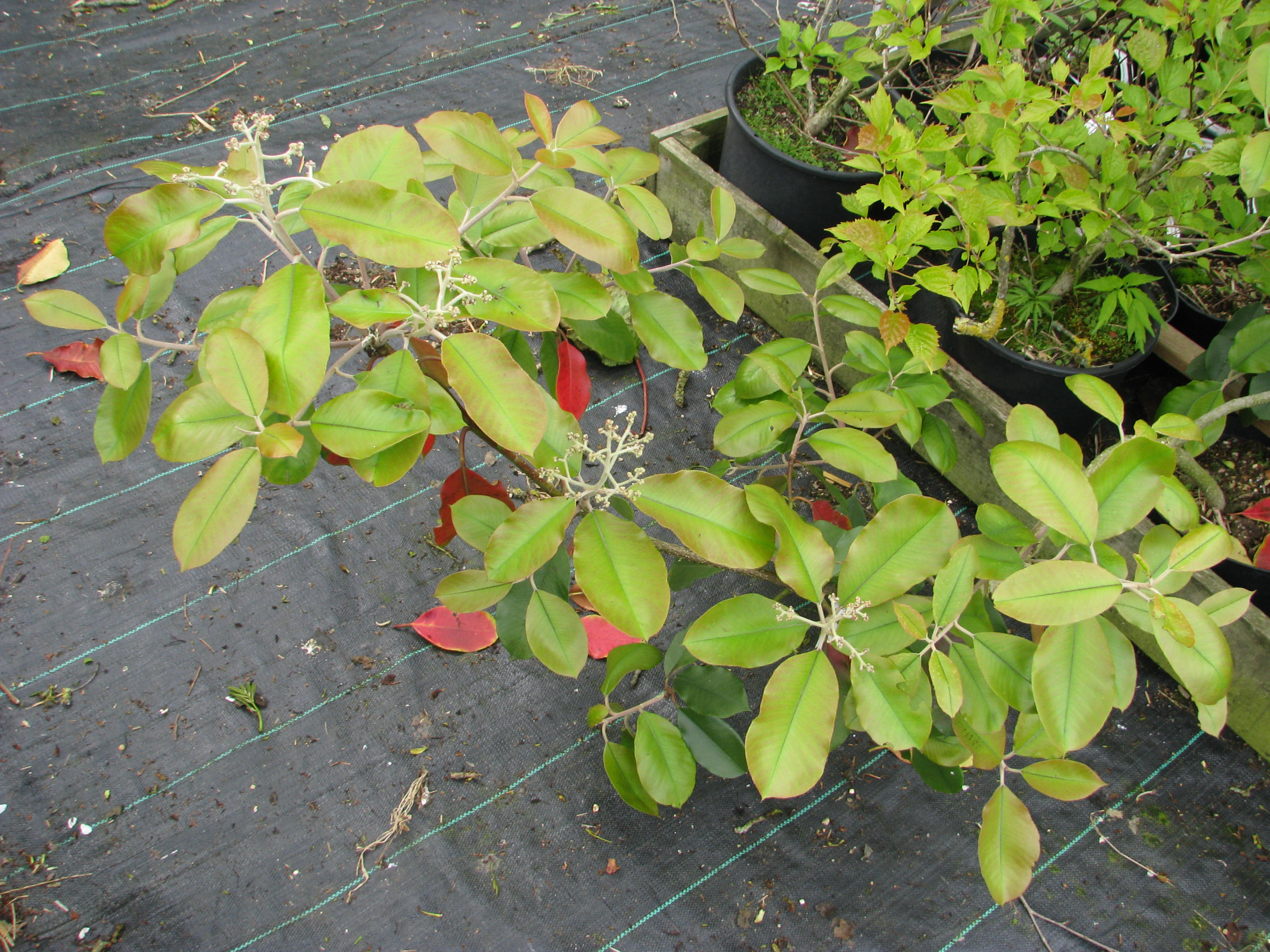

Scientific classification
- Kingdom: Plantae
- Clade: Tracheophytes
- Clade: Angiosperms
- Clade: Eudicots
- Clade: Rosids
- Order: Rosales
- Family: Rosaceae
- Genus: Photinia
- Species: P. prionophylla

Binomial name
- Photinia prionophylla C.K.Schneid.

= Photinia prionophylla =

Species of flowering plant

Photinia prionophylla (Chinese: 刺叶石楠) is a species in the family Rosaceae of flowering plants.
