= Photinia loriformis =

Scientific classification
- Kingdom: Plantae
- Clade: Tracheophytes
- Clade: Angiosperms
- Clade: Eudicots
- Clade: Rosids
- Order: Rosales
- Family: Rosaceae
- Genus: Photinia
- Species: P. loriformis

Binomial name
- Photinia loriformis W.W.Sm.

Synonyms
- Pyrus loriformis (W.W.Sm.) M.F.Fay & Christenh.

Species of flowering plant

Photinia loriformis is a species in the family Rosaceae. They grow to a height of approximately 3 meters (9.8 ft). They are common in China.
