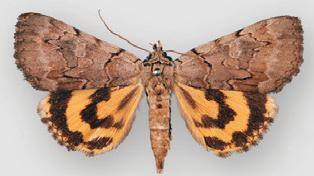
- Catocala praeclara manitoba

Scientific classification
- Kingdom: Animalia
- Phylum: Arthropoda
- Class: Insecta
- Order: Lepidoptera
- Superfamily: Noctuoidea
- Family: Erebidae
- Genus: Catocala
- Species: C. manitoba

Binomial name
- Catocala manitoba Beutenmüller, 1908

= Catocala manitoba =

Species of moth

The Manitoba underwing, Catocala manitoba or Catocala praeclara manitoba, is a moth of the family Erebidae. It is found in Manitoba.

The larvae feed on Populus and Salix.
