= Photinia crassifolia =

Scientific classification
- Kingdom: Plantae
- Clade: Tracheophytes
- Clade: Angiosperms
- Clade: Eudicots
- Clade: Rosids
- Order: Rosales
- Family: Rosaceae
- Genus: Photinia
- Species: P. crassifolia

Binomial name
- Photinia crassifolia H.Lév.

Species of flowering plant

Photinia crassifolia is a species in the family Rosaceae. It can be found in the Guangxi, Guizhou, and Yunnan regions of southwestern China. It was first described in 1915 by Augustin Abel Hector Léveillé in his Flore du Kouy Tcheou.
