= Photinia stenophylla =

Scientific classification
- Kingdom: Plantae
- Clade: Tracheophytes
- Clade: Angiosperms
- Clade: Eudicots
- Clade: Rosids
- Order: Rosales
- Family: Rosaceae
- Genus: Photinia
- Species: P. stenophylla

Binomial name
- Photinia stenophylla Hand.-Mazz.

Species of flowering plant

Photinia stenophylla (Chinese: 窄叶石楠) is a species in the family Rosaceae of flowering plants. It is found in China and Thailand.
