= Photinia chingiana =

Conservation status
- Data Deficient (IUCN 3.1)

Scientific classification
- Kingdom: Plantae
- Clade: Tracheophytes
- Clade: Angiosperms
- Clade: Eudicots
- Clade: Rosids
- Order: Rosales
- Family: Rosaceae
- Genus: Photinia
- Species: P. chingiana

Binomial name
- Photinia chingiana Hand.-Mazz.

Synonyms
- Photinia kwangsiensis H.L.Li

Species of flowering plant

Photinia chingiana is a species of shrub or small tree in the family Rosaceae. It is found in Guangxi and Guizhou in south-central and south-eastern China in forests, valley thickets, and river banks at elevations below 1,200 m (3,900 ft). It can grow 5 m (16 ft) tall.

Photinia kwangsiensis from Guangxi is treated as synonym of Photinia chingiana in some but not in all sources.
