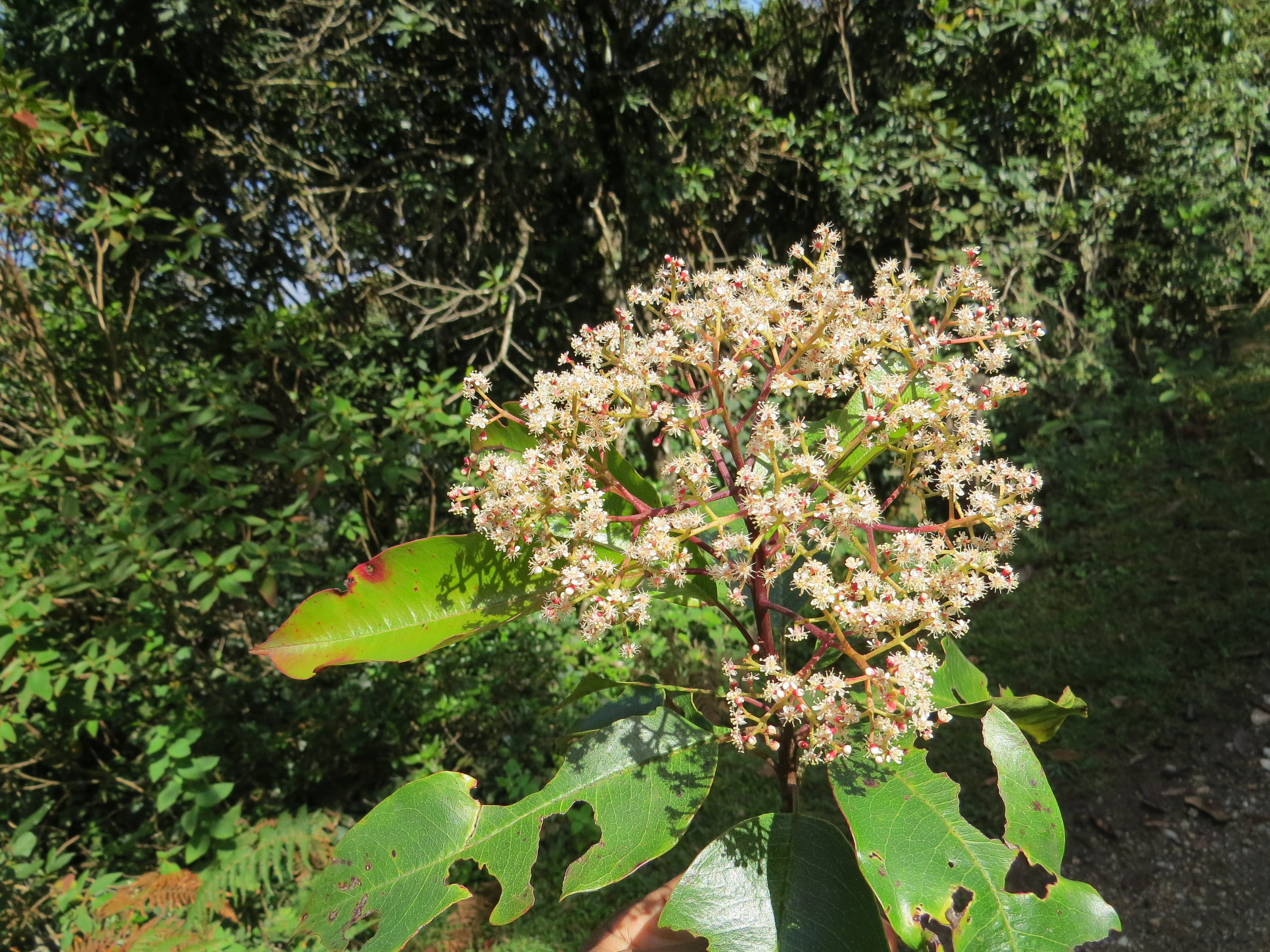

Conservation status
- Least Concern (IUCN 3.1)

Scientific classification
- Kingdom: Plantae
- Clade: Tracheophytes
- Clade: Angiosperms
- Clade: Eudicots
- Clade: Rosids
- Order: Rosales
- Family: Rosaceae
- Genus: Photinia
- Species: P. integrifolia

Binomial name
- Photinia integrifolia Lindl.

= Photinia integrifolia =

Species of tree

Photinia integrifolia is a species in the family Rosaceae, native to Asia.
