= Catocala charlottae =

Scientific classification
- Kingdom: Animalia
- Phylum: Arthropoda
- Class: Insecta
- Order: Lepidoptera
- Superfamily: Noctuoidea
- Family: Erebidae
- Genus: Catocala
- Species: C. charlottae

Binomial name
- Catocala charlottae Brou, 1988

Species of moth

Catocala charlottae or Catocala praeclara charlottae is a moth of the family Erebidae. It is found in Louisiana.
