= Photinia prunifolia =

Scientific classification
- Kingdom: Plantae
- Clade: Tracheophytes
- Clade: Angiosperms
- Clade: Eudicots
- Clade: Rosids
- Order: Rosales
- Family: Rosaceae
- Genus: Photinia
- Species: P. prunifolia

Binomial name
- Photinia prunifolia (Hook. & Arn.) Lindl.

Synonyms
- Photinia consimilis Hand.-Mazz.; Photinia melanostigma Hance; Photinia prunifolia var. denticulata T.T.Yu; Photinia raupingensis K.C.Kuan; Photinia serrulata var. prunifolia Hook. & Arn. (1833) (basionym); Pyrus raupingensis (K.C.Kuan) M.F.Fay & Christenh.; Pyrus uranus M.F.Fay & Christenh.

Species of flowering plant

Photinia prunifolia is a species of flowering plant in the family Rosaceae. It is a tree native to subtropical southern China and Vietnam, and tropical mountains on the islands of Borneo (Mount Kinabalu) and possibly Sumatra (Gunung Sago).
