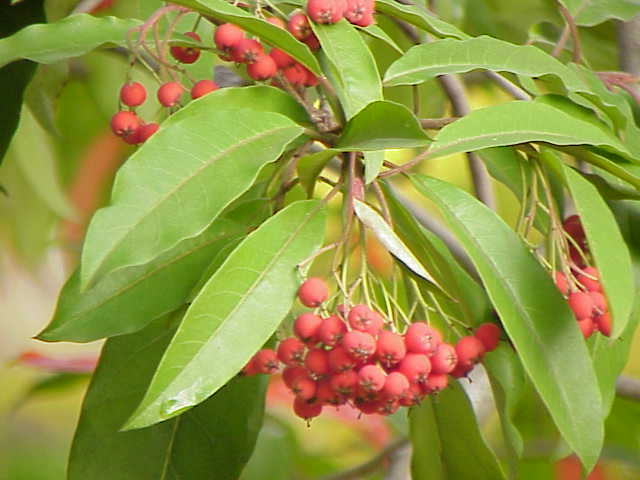

Scientific classification
- Kingdom: Plantae
- Clade: Tracheophytes
- Clade: Angiosperms
- Clade: Eudicots
- Clade: Rosids
- Order: Rosales
- Family: Rosaceae
- Genus: Photinia
- Species: P. davidiana

Binomial name
- Photinia davidiana (Decne.) Cardot

Varieties
- Photinia davidiana var. davidiana; Photinia davidiana var. undulata (Decne.) Long Y.Wang, W.Guo & W.B.Liao

Synonyms
- Pyrus davidiana (Decne.) M.F.Fay & Christenh.; Stranvaesia davidiana Decne. (1874)

= Photinia davidiana =

Species of shrub

Photinia davidiana, the Chinese photinia, is a species of flowering plant in the family Rosaceae. It is a shrub or tree native to Asia, ranging from central and southern China to northern Vietnam, Taiwan, northern Sumatra, and Mount Kinabalu on Borneo. Its flowers are white and grow in close clusters, followed by small pome fruits.

It is grown as an ornamental plant, and has been introduced to North America as a garden plant.

Two varieties are accepted.

- Photinia davidiana var. davidiana – central and southern China, northern Vietnam, Taiwan, northern Sumatra, and Mount Kinabalu
- Photinia davidiana var. undulata (Decne.) Long Y.Wang, W.Guo & W.B.Liao – central and southern China and northern Vietnam

The species was first described as Stranvaesia davidiana by Joseph Decaisne in 1874. In 2019 it was placed in genus Photinia as Photinia davidiana.
