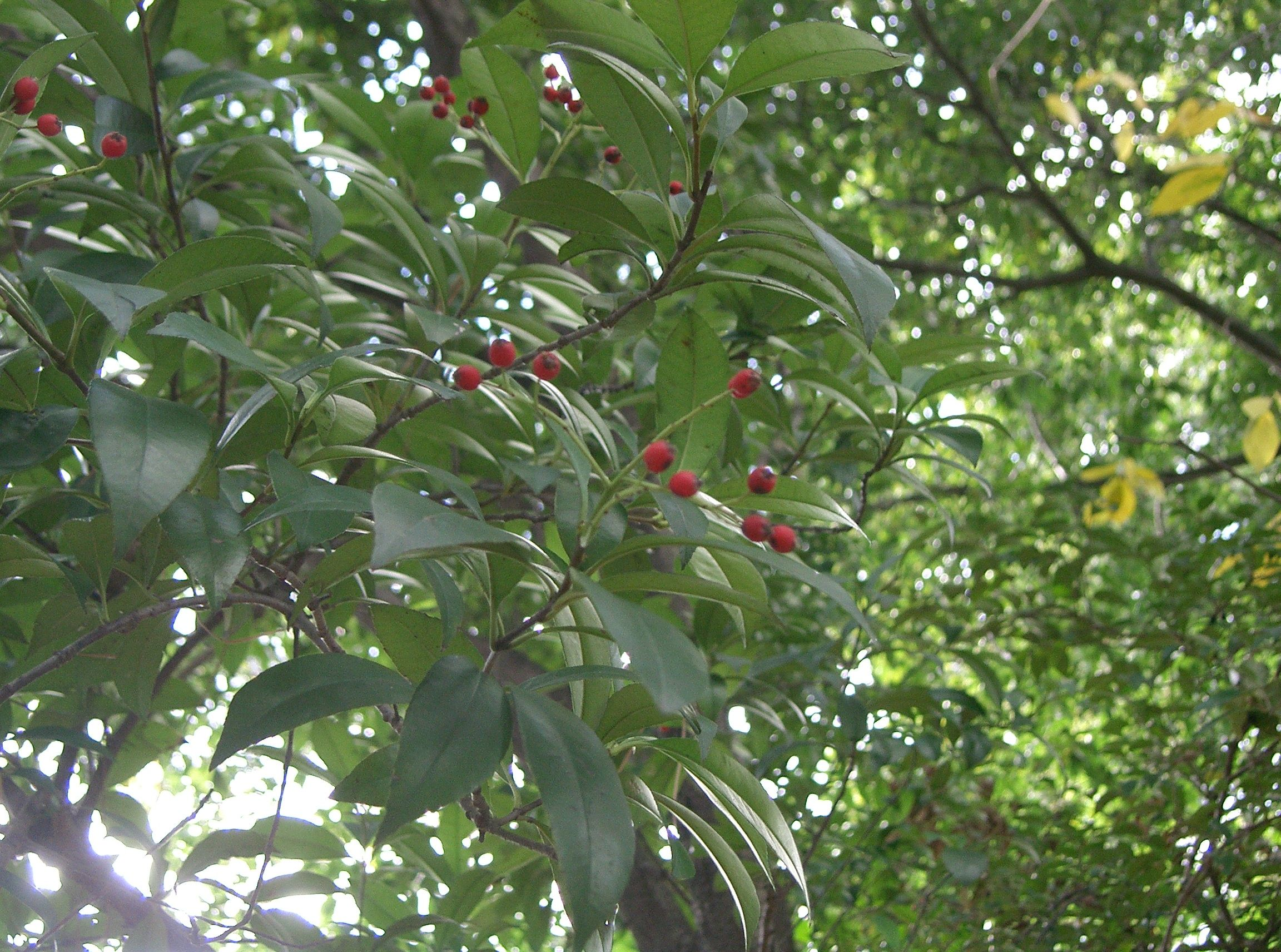

Conservation status
- Least Concern (IUCN 3.1)

Scientific classification
- Kingdom: Plantae
- Clade: Tracheophytes
- Clade: Angiosperms
- Clade: Eudicots
- Clade: Rosids
- Order: Rosales
- Family: Rosaceae
- Genus: Photinia
- Species: P. glabra

Binomial name
- Photinia glabra (Thunb.) Franch. & Sav.

= Photinia glabra =

Species of flowering plant

Photinia glabra, or the Japanese photinia, is a species in the family Rosaceae.
