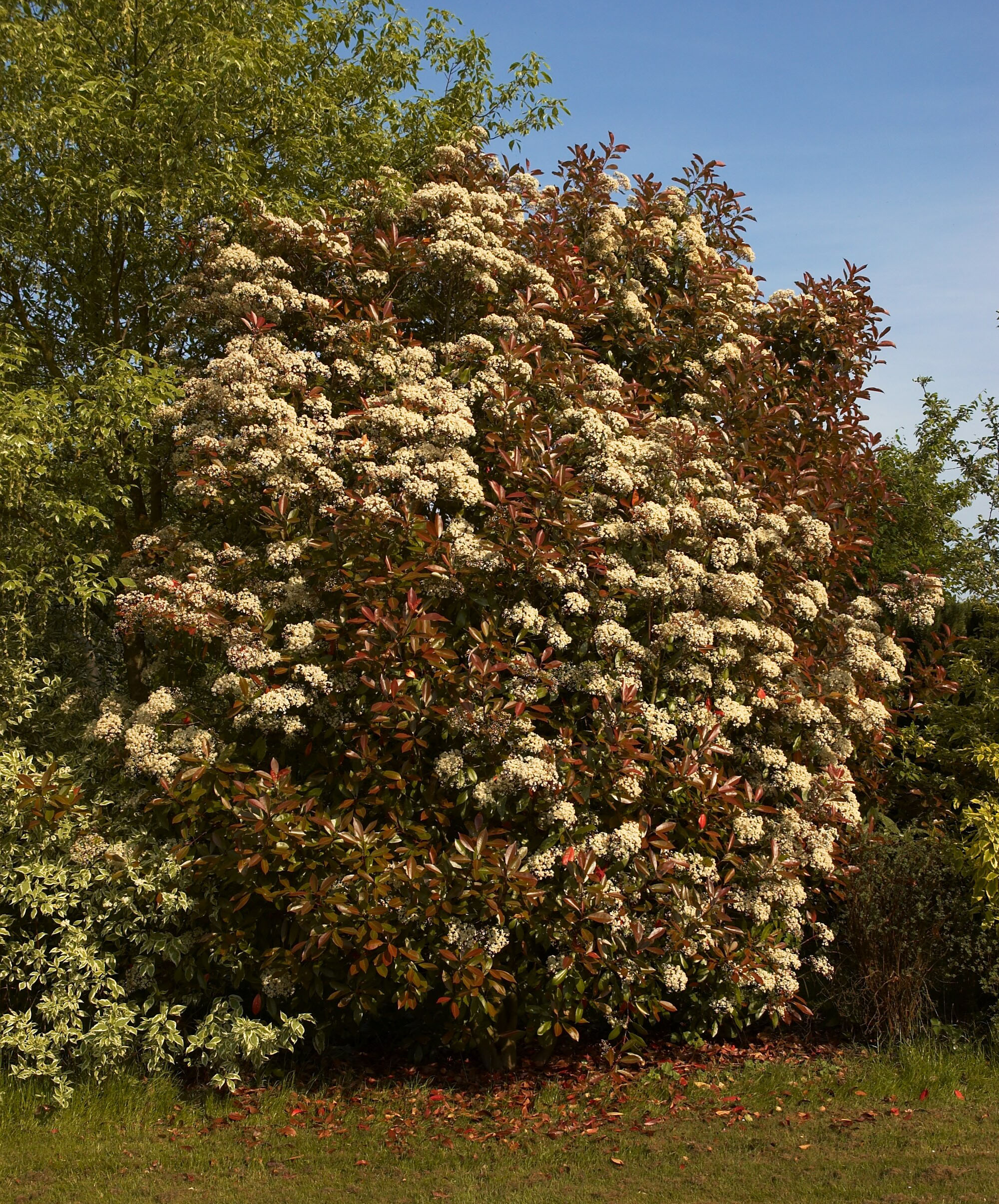
- Photinia × fraseri in flower

Scientific classification
- Kingdom: Plantae
- Clade: Embryophytes
- Clade: Tracheophytes
- Clade: Spermatophytes
- Clade: Angiosperms
- Clade: Eudicots
- Clade: Rosids
- Order: Rosales
- Family: Rosaceae
- Subfamily: Amygdaloideae
- Tribe: Maleae
- Subtribe: Malinae
- Genus: Photinia; Lindl.

Species
- See here

Synonyms
- Heteromeles M.Roem.; Myriomeles (Lindl.) Lindl.

= Photinia =

Photinia Temporal range: Eocene - recent

Genus of shrubs in the family Rosaceae

Photinia (/foʊˈtɪniə, fə-/ (Note: Sunset Western Garden Book, 1995:606–607) (Note: "Photinia". Lexico UK English Dictionary. Oxford University Press. Archived from the original on January 23, 2022.)) is a genus of about 30 species of small trees and large shrubs, but the taxonomy has recently varied greatly, with the genera Heteromeles, Stranvaesia and Aronia sometimes included in Photinia.

They are a part of the rose family (Rosaceae) and related to the apple. The botanical genus name derives from the Greek word φωτεινός / phōteinós for "shiny" and refers to the often glossy leaves. Most species are evergreen, but deciduous species also occur. The small apple-shaped fruit has a size of 4 to 12 mm and forms in large quantities. They ripen in the fall and often remain hanging on the bush until well into the winter. The fruits are used as food by birds, which excrete the seeds with their droppings and thereby distribute the plant.

The natural range of these species is restricted to warm temperate and tropical Asia, from the Himalayas east to Japan and south to India, Indochina and Malesia. They have, however, been widely cultivated throughout the world as ornamentals for their white flowers and red fruits.

The scientific name Photinia is also widely used as the common name. Another name sometimes used is "Christmas berry", but this name is a source of confusion, since it is commonly applied to plants in several genera including Heteromeles, Lycium, Schinus, and Ruscus. The name "photinia" also continues to be used for several species of small trees in the mountains of Mexico and Central America which had formerly been included in the genus Photinia.

== Description ==
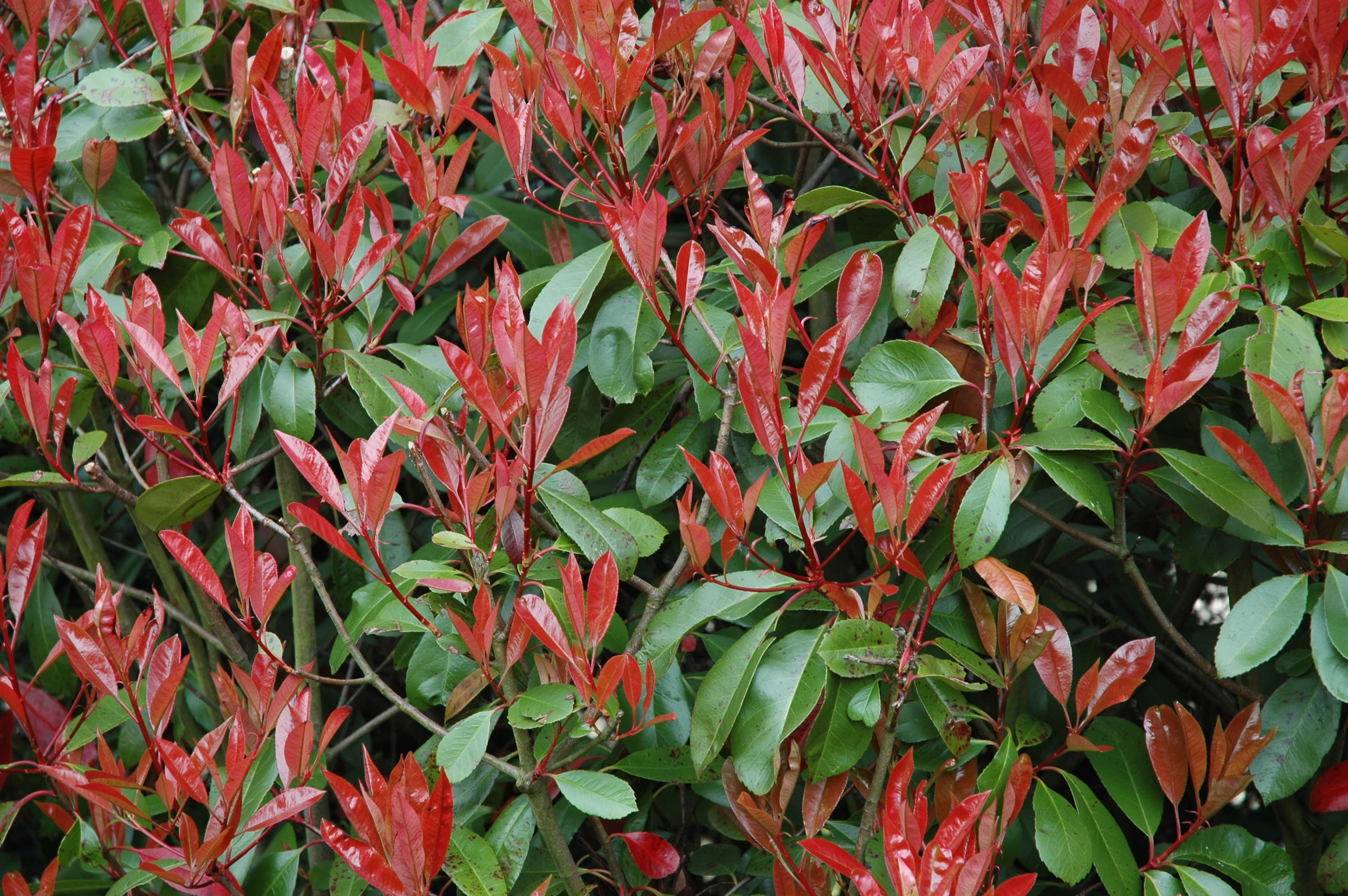
Photinia × fraseri, showing the red colour of new growth contrasted to the glossy green older leaves

Photinia typically grow from 4–15 m tall, with a usually irregular crown of angular branches; the branches are often (not always) thorny. The leaves are alternate, entire or finely toothed, varying between species from 3–15 cm in length and 1.5–5 cm wide; the majority of species are evergreen but several are deciduous. The flowers are produced in early summer in dense terminal corymbs; each flower is 5–10 mm diameter, with five rounded white petals; they have a mild, hawthorn-like scent. The fruit is a small pome, 4–12 mm across, bright red and berry-like, produced large quantities, maturing in the fall and often persisting well into the winter. The fruit are consumed by birds, including thrushes, waxwings and starlings; the seeds are dispersed in their droppings. Photinia species are sometimes used as food plants by the larvae of some Lepidoptera species including common emerald, feathered thorn and setaceous Hebrew character.

== Taxonomy ==
Some botanists also include the closely related North American species Heteromeles arbutifolia in Photinia — as Photinia arbutifolia. The genus Stranvaesia is so similar in morphology to Photinia that its species have sometimes been included within it, but recent molecular data indicate that the two genera are not closely related. The genus Aronia has been included in Photinia in some classifications, but recent molecular data confirm that these genera are not closely related. Other close relatives include the firethorns (Pyracantha), cotoneasters (Cotoneaster) and hawthorns (Crataegus).

=== Species ===
27 species are accepted by Plants of the World Online as of August 2025.

- Photinia anlungensis T.T.Yu
- Photinia arbutifolia Lindl.
- Photinia berberidifolia Rehder & E.H.Wilson
- Photinia chihsiniana K.C.Kuan
- Photinia chingiana Hand.-Mazz.
- Photinia chingshuiensis (T.Shimizu) T.S.Liu & H.J.Su
- Photinia chiuana Z.H.Chen, Feng Chen & X.F.Jin
- Photinia crassifolia H.Lév.
- Photinia cucphuongensis T.H.Nguyên & Yakovlev
- Photinia davidiana (Decne.) Cardot
- Photinia fokienensis (Finet & Franch.) Franch. ex Cardot
- Photinia × fraseri Dress
- Photinia glabra (Thunb.) Jacob-Makoy
- Photinia griffithii Decne.
- Photinia hirsuta Hand.-Mazz.
- Photinia impressivena Hayata
- Photinia integrifolia Lindl.
- Photinia lanuginosa T.T.Yu
- Photinia lindleyana Wight & Arn.
- Photinia lochengensis T.T.Yu
- Photinia loriformis W.W.Sm.
- Photinia megaphylla T.T.Yu & T.C.Ku
- Photinia microphylla (J.E.Vidal) B.B.Liu
- Photinia prionophylla (Franch.) C.K.Schneid.
- Photinia prunifolia (Hook. & Arn.) Lindl.
- Photinia serratifolia (Desf.) Kalkman
- Photinia stenophylla Hand.-Mazz.
- Photinia taishunensis G.H.Xia, L.H.Lou & S.H.Jin
- Photinia tushanensis T.T.Yu
- Photinia wrightiana Maxim.

=== Extinct species ===
A small group of extinct species have been described from the Asian, European, and North American fossil records.

- †Photinia eratonis von Ettingshausen Langhian, Styria, Austria
- †Photinia kodorica Kolakovsky Pliocene, Kodor river, Abkhazia/Georgia
- †Photinia pageae Wolfe & Wehr Ypresian, Eocene Okanogan Highlands, Western North America
- †Photinia sarmatiaca Doweld (replacement name for Photinia acuminata Baikovskaja, 1965) Serravallian, Rostov region, Russian Federation
- †Photinia szaferi Zastawniak Tortonian, Mirotstowice Dolne, Lower Silesia, Poland

=== Formerly placed here ===
- Pourthiaea arguta (Wall. ex Lindl.) Decne. (as Photinia arguta Wall. ex Lindl.)
- Pourthiaea beauverdiana (C.K.Schneid.) Hatus. (as Photinia beauverdiana C.K.Schneid.)
- Pourthiaea pustulata (Lindl.) B.B.Liu (as Photinia pustulata Lindl.)
- Pourthiaea sorbifolia (W.B.Liao & W.Guo) B.B.Liu & D.Y.Hong (as Photinia sorbifolia W.B.Liao & W.Guo)
- Pourthiaea zhejiangensis (P.L.Chiu) Iketani & H.Ohashi (as Photinia zhejiangensis P.L.Chiu)
- Stranvaesia lasiogyna (Franch.) B.B.Liu (as Photinia lasiogyna (Franch.) C.K.Schneid.)
- Weniomeles atropurpurea (P.L.Chiu ex Z.H.Chen & X.F.Jin) B.B.Liu (as Photinia atropurpurea P.L.Chiu ex Z.H.Chen & X.F.Jin)
- Weniomeles bodinieri (H.Lév.) B.B.Liu (as Photinia bodinieri H.Lév.)

== Ecology ==
Photinia are susceptible to leaf blight caused by the bacterium Erwinia amylovora.

== Uses ==
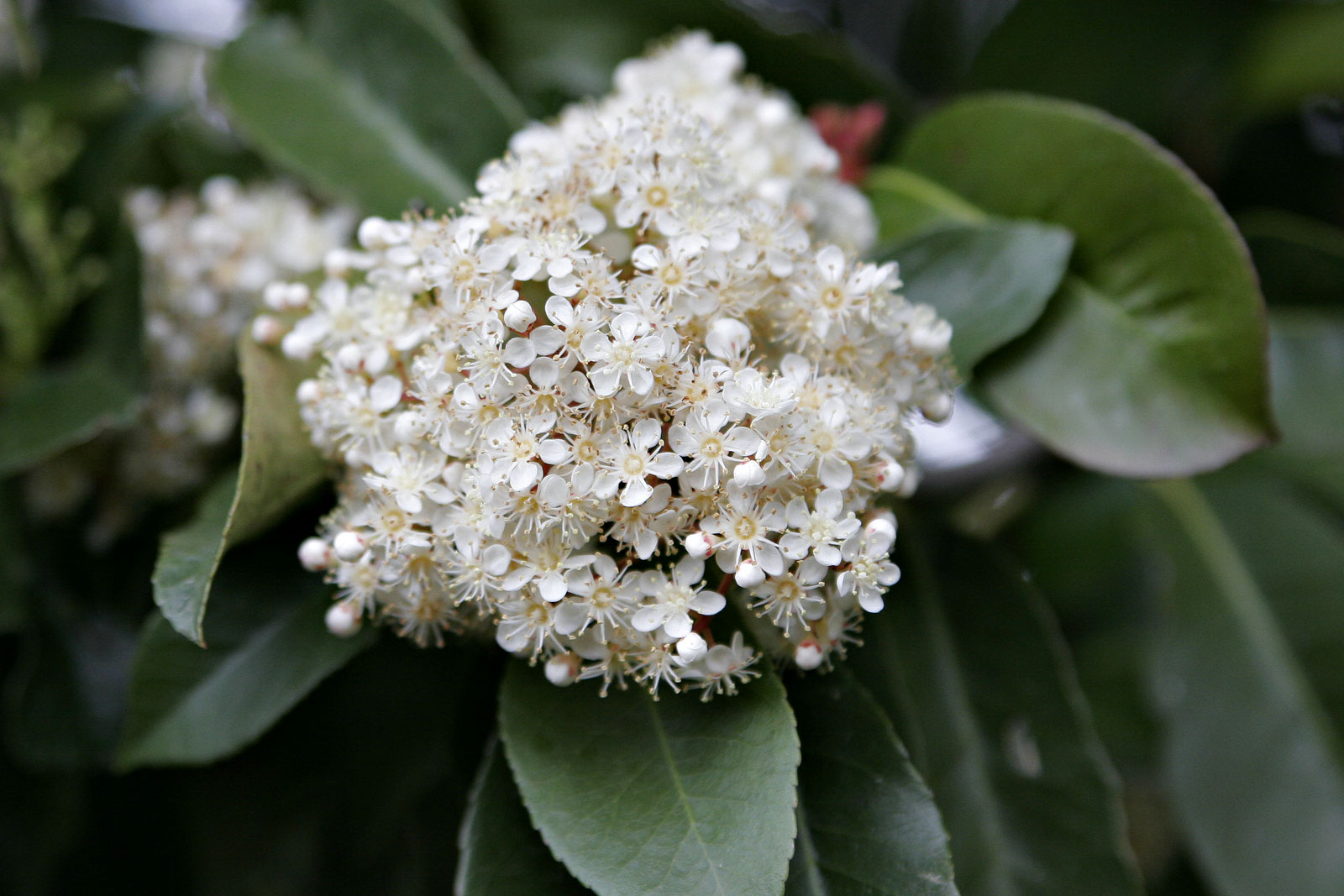
Flower of an ornamental shrub cultivar

Photinias are very popular ornamental shrubs, grown for their fruit and foliage. Numerous hybrids and cultivars are available; several of the cultivars are selected for their strikingly bright red young leaves in spring and summer. The most widely planted are:

- Photinia × fraseri (P. glabra × P. serratifolia) - red tip photinia, Christmas berry

- Photinia × fraseri 'Red Robin' - probably the most widely planted of all, this cultivar has gained the Royal Horticultural Society's Award of Garden Merit
- Photinia × fraseri 'Little Red Robin', a plant similar to 'Red Robin', but dwarf in stature with an ultimate height/spread of around 2–3 ft
- Photinia × fraseri 'Camilvy'
- Photinia × fraseri 'Curly Fantasy'
- Photinia × fraseri 'Super Hedger' - a newer hybrid with strong upright growth
- Photinia × fraseri 'Pink Marble' also known as 'Cassini', a new cultivar with rose-pink tinted new growth and a creamy-white variegated margin on the leaves
- Photinia × fraseri 'Robusta'

- Photinia 'Redstart' (P. davidiana × P. × fraseri)
- Photinia 'Palette' (parentage unknown)
- Photinia davidiana 'Fructu Luteo' (fruit yellow)
- Photinia davidiana 'Prostrata' (a low-growing form)

== Toxicity ==
Some varieties of Photinia are toxic due to the presence of cyanogenic glycosides in the vacuoles of foliage and fruit cells. When the leaves are chewed these compounds are released and are rapidly converted to hydrogen cyanide (HCN) which blocks cellular respiration. The amount of HCN produced varies considerably between taxa, and is in general greatest in young leaves. Ruminants are particularly affected by cyanogenic glycosides because the first stage of their digestive system (the rumen) provides better conditions for liberating HCN than the stomachs of monogastric vertebrates.
