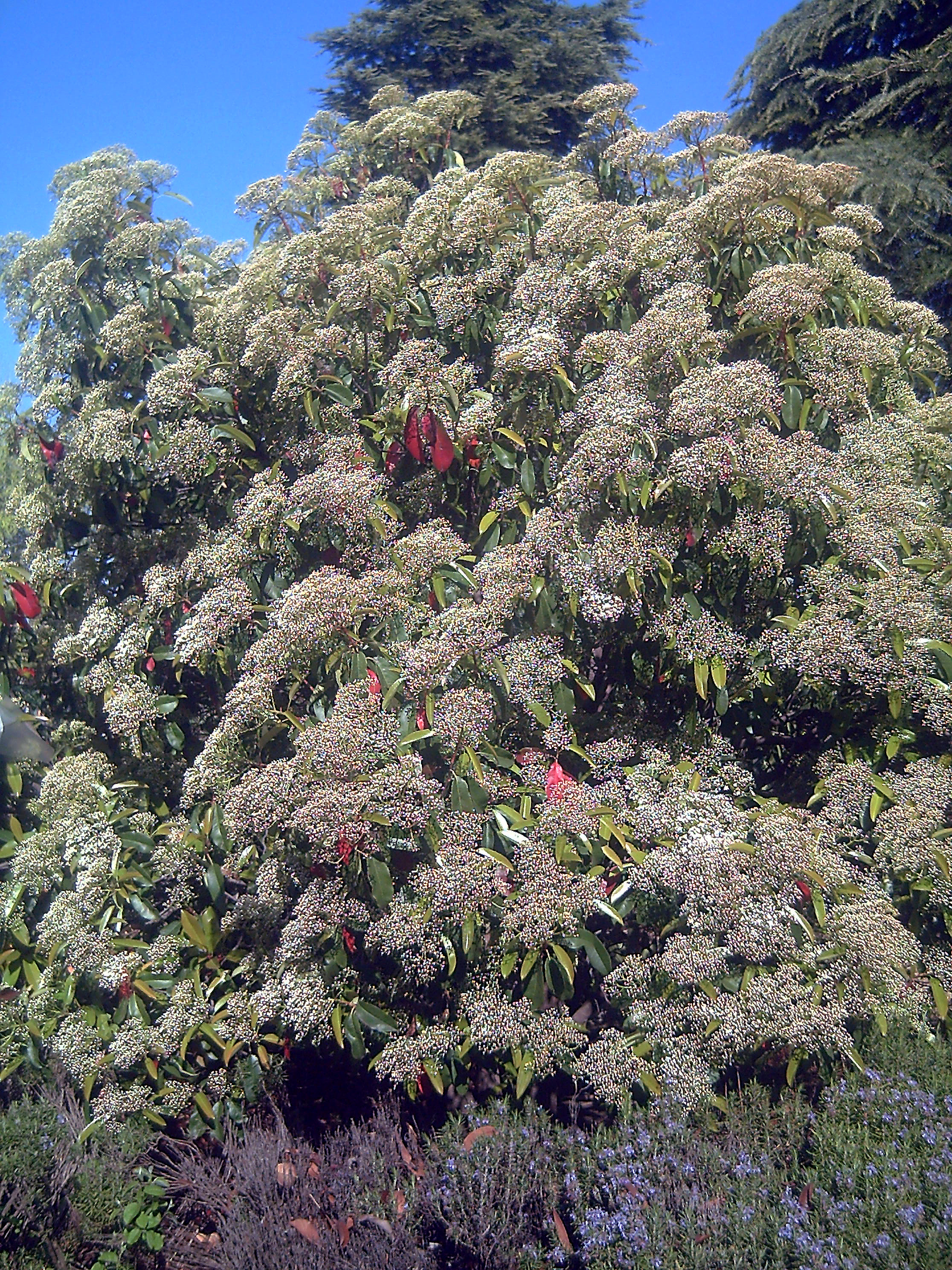

Scientific classification
- Kingdom: Plantae
- Clade: Tracheophytes
- Clade: Angiosperms
- Clade: Eudicots
- Clade: Rosids
- Order: Rosales
- Family: Rosaceae
- Genus: Photinia
- Species: P. serratifolia

Binomial name
- Photinia serratifolia (Desf.) Kalkman

Synonyms
- P. serrulata Franch. & Sav.

= Photinia serratifolia =

Species of tree

Photinia serratifolia (syn. Photinia serrulata), commonly called Taiwanese photinia or Chinese photinia is a flowering shrub or tree in the flowering plants family Rosaceae, found in mixed forests of China, Taiwan, Japan, the Philippines, Indonesia, and India.

== Description ==
The tree is evergreen, with white flowers emerging in spring accompanied by red-colored leaves, and red fruits growing in autumn. It grows typically 4–6 m (13–20 ft), sometimes up to 12 m (39 ft), tall. Its leaves are toxic due to the presence of cyanogenic glycosides. The flowers, blossoming in spring, typically last for one to two weeks. Its flowers are known to have a strong scent similar to that of human semen. The flowers have bell-shaped sepals split into five lobes, and around 20 stamens. The ovary contains two to four locules, with one ovule in each locule. The tree produces a high amount of bright, red colored fruits that are small pomes with diameters ranging from 4–12 millimetres (0.16–0.47 inches), each containing one to four seeds. The fruits, which ripen in autumn and survive through winter, are a food source to various kinds of birds, including thrushes, waxwings, and starlings. The seeds spread primarily through bird excretions.

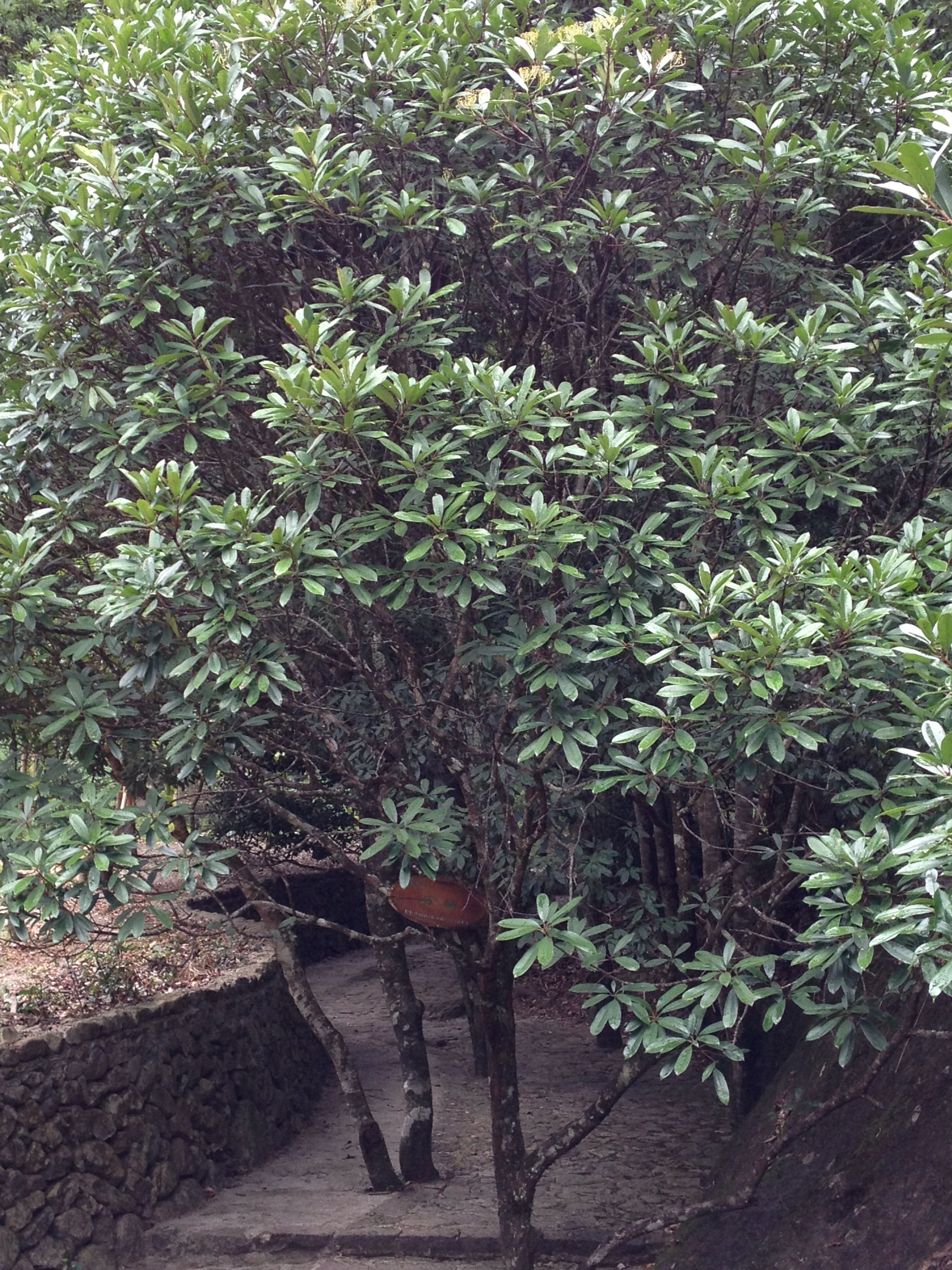
Photinia serratifolia

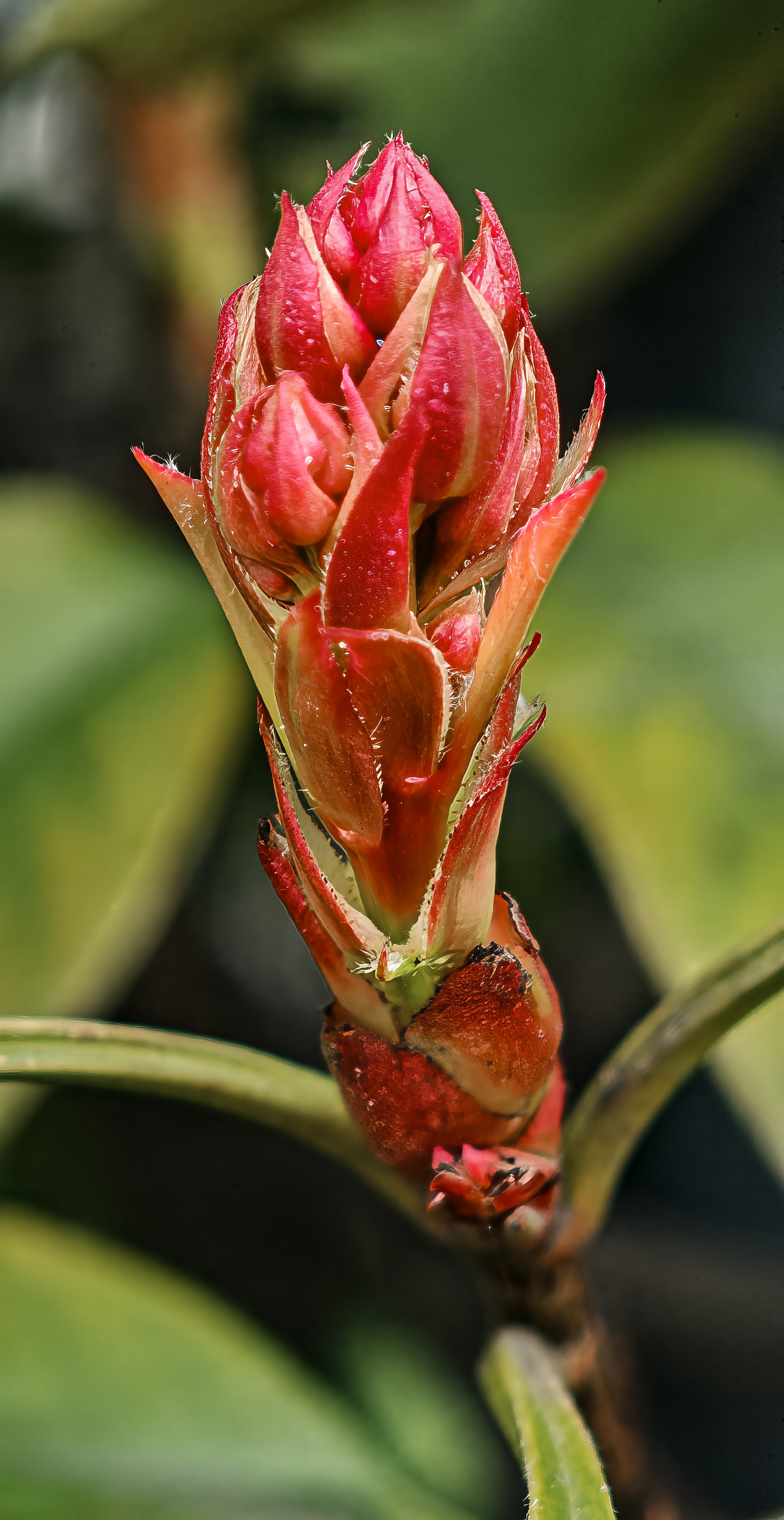
Photinia serratifolia, bud

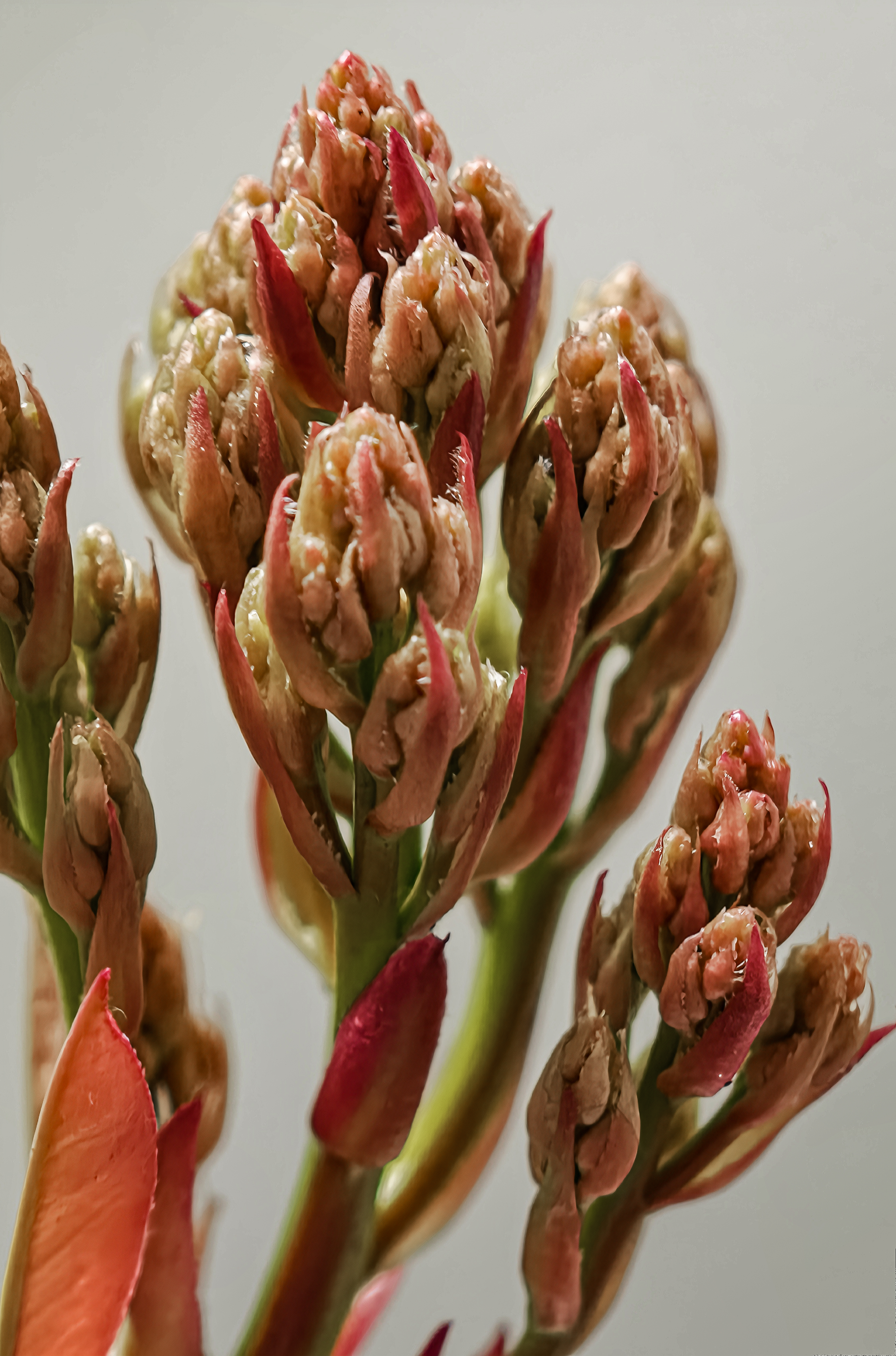
Immature inflorescences

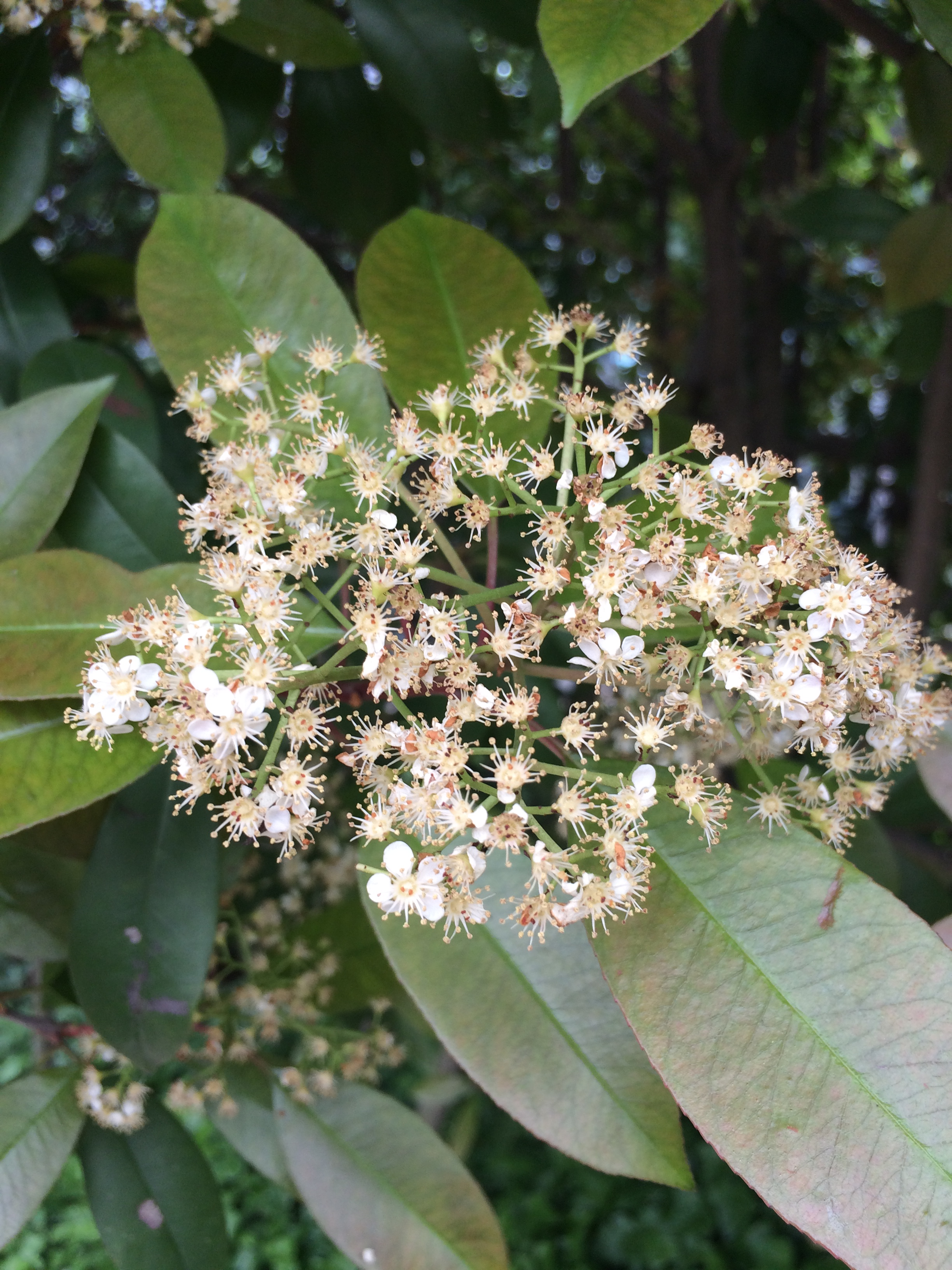
Flowers

== Distribution and habitat ==
The tree is typically found at altitudes from sea level to 2,500 metres (8,000 ft). It is found in mixed forests of central and southern China, Taiwan, Japan, the Philippines, Indonesia, and India.

== Varieties ==
Three varieties of the species are recognized in the Flora of China:

- Photinia serratifolia var. ardisiifolia. Narrow leaf variant native to Taiwan, typically found around 850m altitude. Leaves are obovate (reverse ovate), ellipse-shaped, and leathery in texture.
- Photinia serratifolia var. daphniphylloides. Wide leaf variant native to Taiwan. Leaves are elliptic or long obovate.
- Photinia serratifolia var. lasiopetala. Native to Taiwan. Leaves are obovate, slender, or spoon-shaped.

== Uses ==
The tree is widely used as a greening plant in some mainland Chinese cities, due to the relative ease to plant and maintain, and the tree being less demanding for its surrounding environments. In Wuhan, where the tree is in its native range, the tree is planted by the sides of all major avenues, as well as in the Wuhan University. However, due to the strong, semen-like odor from its flowers filling the entire city in spring, some Wuhan residents have complained that the tree should be removed and other trees should be planted instead.
