= Te-tsun Yu =

Chinese botanist (1908–1986)

- Born: February 1, 1908; Beijing, Qing China
- Died: July 1986 (aged 77–78)
- Education: Beijing Normal University
- Scientific career
- Fields: Botany

Te-tsun Yu (1908–1986) was a Chinese botanist who specialised in spermatophytes, particularly in the Yunnan and Sichuan provinces of China.

== Education ==
Yu majored in botany at Beijing Normal University. He was a student of Hu Xiansu.

== Career ==
Yu was a co-founder of the Kunming Institute of Botany. He worked as editor of the Flora Reipublicae Popularis Sinicae and director of the Institute of Botany at the Chinese Academy of Sciences.

He was a prolific collector of plant specimens in Yunnan, making expeditions into the largely unexplored mountains in the north west of the province. Thousands of specimens he collected were exported to Arnold Arboretum in Boston, Massachusetts and Royal Botanic Garden Edinburgh who funded the expeditions in 1937.

In 1979 he toured the United States as part of a delegation from the Botanical Society of the People's Republic of China in reciprocal arrangements with the Botanical Society of America. This collaboration led to the Flora of China Project which started shortly after Yu's death and was first published in 1994.

He compiled "The Botanical Gardens of China" (Published: 1983 by Science Press, Beijing, ISBN 9780945345084) which contains many colour photographs and maps of each botanical garden.
