= Pyrus phaeocarpa =

Scientific classification
- Kingdom: Plantae
- Clade: Embryophytes
- Clade: Tracheophytes
- Clade: Spermatophytes
- Clade: Angiosperms
- Clade: Eudicots
- Clade: Rosids
- Order: Rosales
- Family: Rosaceae
- Genus: Pyrus
- Species: P. phaeocarpa

Binomial name
- Pyrus phaeocarpa Rehder

Species of flowering plant

Pyrus phaeocarpa, the dusky pear or orange pear, is a species of flowering plant in the family Rosaceae, native to the Loess Plateau of northern China. A wide tree reaching at most 7–8 m (23–26 ft) in height, it is hardy to USDA zone 5, or perhaps even zone 4. Its small yellow to brown fruit are edible, and its Autumn foliage is bright orange to orange-red, giving it good potential as an ornamental. Its chloroplast genome shows that it is closely related to Pyrus pashia, the wild Himalayan pear, and it is suspected to be a hybrid of P. betulifolia, the birchleaf pear, P. pyrifolia, the apple pear, and P. ussuriensis, the Manchurian pear.
