= List of Asian pear cultivars =

Asian pears are not native to Europe or North America. Several breeders in the United States and Canada are working to develop new cultivars with improved cold hardiness and disease resistance.

Common name	Image	Origin	Year released	Tree Characteristic	Fruit Characteristic	Other info
Hanhong		Jilin, China	2003	Upright, very hardy	crisp fruit, sweet, with some grid cell	‘Nanguoli’ (Pyrus ussuriensis Maxim.) × ‘Jinsu’ (Pyrus bretschneideri Rehd.)
Tennosui		Texas A&M University, US	2004	very vigorous, resistance to fire blight	do not turn brown after cutting	'LeConte' X 'Shin li', Resistant to fire blight
Harovin Sundown		AAFC, Vineland research centre, Ontario, Canada	2009	good storage, resistant to fire blight,	grid free, very juicy with fine texture, intense pear flavour	‘Bartlett’ × US56112-146
Shinko		Japan	~1940			'Nijisseiki' X 'Amanogawa', Resistant to fire blight
