= Pyrus xerophila =

Scientific classification
- Kingdom: Plantae
- Clade: Embryophytes
- Clade: Tracheophytes
- Clade: Spermatophytes
- Clade: Angiosperms
- Clade: Eudicots
- Clade: Rosids
- Order: Rosales
- Family: Rosaceae
- Genus: Pyrus
- Species: P. xerophila

Binomial name
- Pyrus xerophila T.T.Yu

Species of flowering plant

Pyrus xerophila is a species of flowering plant in the genus Pyrus found in China. It is a probable hybrid species resulting from crosses between Pyrus pashia (Himalayan pear), Pyrus ussuriensis (Manchurian pear), and the western domestic pear, brought together by travelers along the Silk Road. It is used as rootstock for cultivated pears, and the fruit are collected and eaten by local people.
