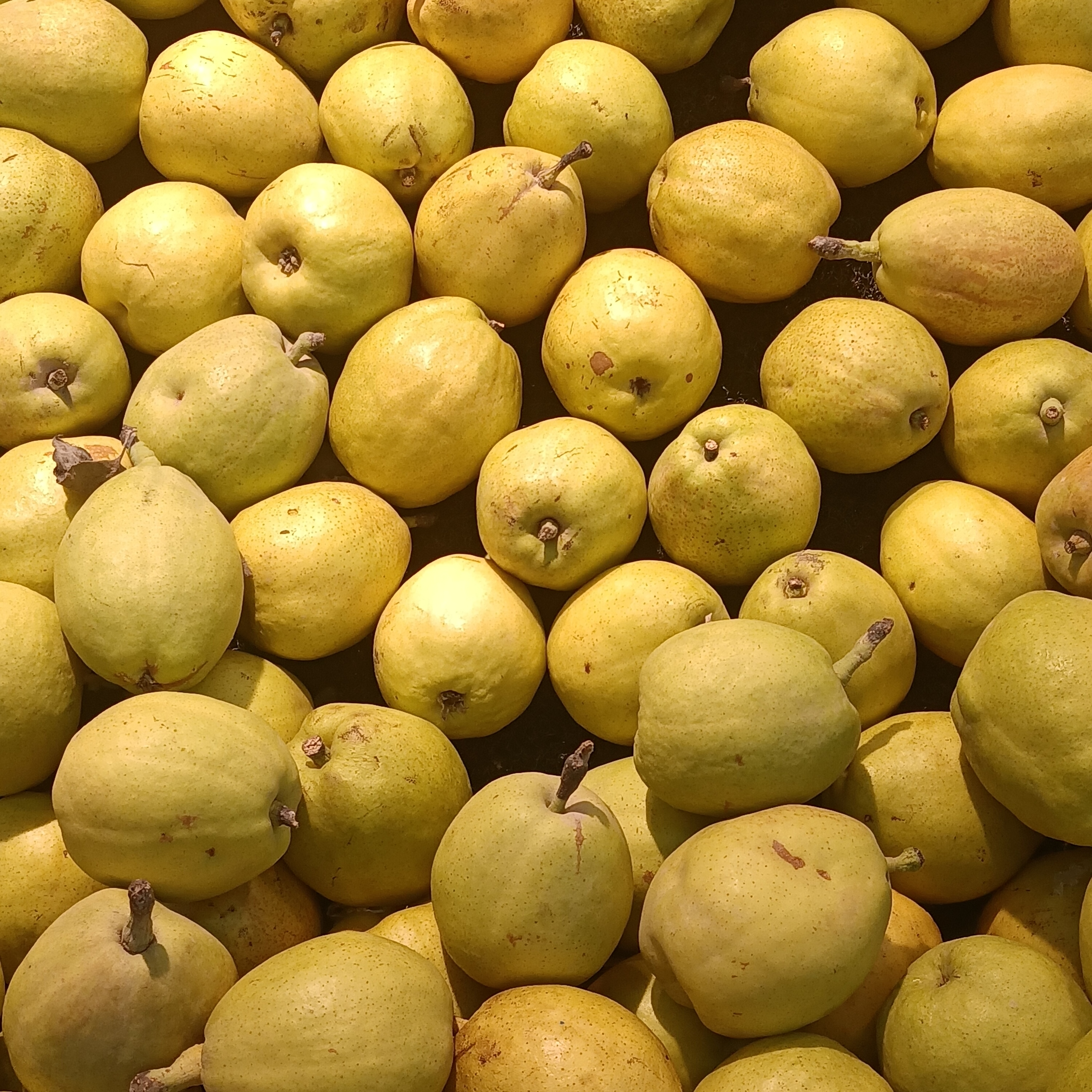

Scientific classification
- Kingdom: Plantae
- Clade: Embryophytes
- Clade: Tracheophytes
- Clade: Spermatophytes
- Clade: Angiosperms
- Clade: Eudicots
- Clade: Rosids
- Order: Rosales
- Family: Rosaceae
- Genus: Pyrus
- Species: P. × sinkiangensis

Binomial name
- Pyrus × sinkiangensis T.T.Yu

= Pyrus × sinkiangensis =

Hybrid species of pear tree

Pyrus × sinkangensis, the Xinjiang pear, has been suspected to be of complex hybrid origin involving P. communis and Chinese white pears based on their morphological characteristics.

Cultivars of P. × sinkangensis vary considerably, combining characteristics of both P. communis and Chinese white pears. Generally, the fruit shape of this species is much similar to P. communis, but with a long pedicel. Some cultivars of P. × sinkiangensis bear fruits with a persistent calyx and strong aroma, needing ripening before being edible, which is similar to P. communis. On the other hand, fruits of some cultivars are juicy and crisp and not needed for ripening, which is like Chinese white pear.

New information from DNA-based markers indicates that P. × sinkiangensis usually produced complex RAPD profiles, at least P. communis, P. armeniacifolia and Chinese white pears or sand pears have been involved in the origin of Xinjiang pears.
