= Indian wild pear =

Indian wild pear is a common name for several plants and may refer to:

- Amelanchier canadensis, native to North America
- Pyrus pashia, native to southern Asia
