= P. salicifolia =

P. salicifolia may refer to:

- Prunus salicifolia, the capulin, a cherry tree species
- Pyrus salicifolia, a pear tree species native to the Middle East

== synonyms ==
- Psychotria salicifolia, a synonym for Psychotria papantlensis, a tree species in the genus Psychotria

== See also ==
- Salicifolia (disambiguation)
