= Dactylispa crassicuspis =

Scientific classification
- Kingdom: Animalia
- Phylum: Arthropoda
- Class: Insecta
- Order: Coleoptera
- Suborder: Polyphaga
- Infraorder: Cucujiformia
- Family: Chrysomelidae
- Genus: Dactylispa
- Species: D. crassicuspis

Binomial name
- Dactylispa crassicuspis Gestro, 1908

Species of beetle

Dactylispa crassicuspis is a species of beetle of the family Chrysomelidae. It is found in China (Fujian, Guangdong, Guizhou, Hunan, Hubei, Jiangxi, Shaanxi, Shensi, Sichuan, Yunnan).

== Life history ==
The recorded host plants for this species are Pyrus calleryana and Pyrus betulifolia.
