= Pyrus boissieriana =

Scientific classification
- Kingdom: Plantae
- Clade: Tracheophytes
- Clade: Angiosperms
- Clade: Eudicots
- Clade: Rosids
- Order: Rosales
- Family: Rosaceae
- Genus: Pyrus
- Species: P. boissieriana

Binomial name
- Pyrus boissieriana Buhse

Synonyms
- List: Pyrus boissieriana subsp. crenulata Browicz; Pyrus cordata subsp. boissieriana (Buhse) Ugurlu & Dönmez; Pyrus serikensis Güner & H.Duman

Species of pear tree

Pyrus boissieriana, the Boissier pear and telka, is a deciduous tree or large shrub in the family Rosaceae, native to the mountainous woodlands of northern Iran. It is one of the most widespread wild pears in the region, valued for its hardiness and attractive fruit.

== Description ==
Pyrus boissieriana grows as a tree or shrub to 10 m tall, often with a broad, irregular crown and stout spines on the lower branches. Buds are ovoid and soon shed their membranous stipules. Leaves are glossy dark green above, pale and sparsely hairy beneath, broadly ovate to orbicular, typically 3–6 by 2.5–5.0 cm, with a cordate to rounded base and serrate margin. In spring, it bears corymbs of 5–15 white flowers, each 11–14 by 8–11 mm, with a short, cup‑shaped hypanthium and 15–20 stamens. By late summer it produces small, globose to subpyriform pomes, 0.7–1.5 cm in diameter, yellow‑brown and densely covered in pale or brown lenticels. Flowering occurs in late April to early May, with ripe fruit from late August to late September.

== Habitat and distribution ==
This species is widespread across the Alborz and Kopet Dag mountain ranges of northern Iran and into adjacent Azerbaijan and Turkmenistan. It grows in humid Hyrcanian forests and their transitional zones at 600–2000 m elevation, often alongside Quercus, Acer, Ulmus, Fagus, Alnus and other broad‑leaved trees and shrubs. It tolerates a range of soils but favours well‑drained slopes and light woodland cover.

== Taxonomy ==
Pyrus boissieriana was first described by Friedrich Buhse in 1860 from specimens collected at Radkan near Gorgan (type in LE‑1046‑a). It is placed in Pyrus section Pashia, whose members share deciduous sepals and lenticellate fruit. Although closely related to Pyrus pashia, it is distinguished by its broadly orbicular leaves, slender yet often stiff fruiting pedicels (2–5 cm long) and its specific distribution in western Asia.
