= Pyrus × michauxii =

Conservation status
- Near Threatened (IUCN 2.3)

Scientific classification
- Kingdom: Plantae
- Clade: Tracheophytes
- Clade: Angiosperms
- Clade: Eudicots
- Clade: Rosids
- Order: Rosales
- Family: Rosaceae
- Genus: Pyrus
- Species: P. × michauxii

Binomial name
- Pyrus × michauxii Bosc ex Poir., 1816

Synonyms
- Pyrus × anatolica (Browicz, 1972)

Species of pear tree

Pyrus × michauxii (Turkish: som ahlat) is an interspecific hybrid species of pear in the family Rosaceae. It is the result of a hybridisation involving P. communis, P. elaeagrifolia and P. spinosa, and is endemic to Turkey.

The branches, leaves, and fruit have been analyzed for the presence of arbutin, phenolics, flavonoids, and antioxidant activity, as well as phytochemical, antioxidant, antimicrobial, and antifungal activity.
