= White pear =

White pear is a common name for several plants and may refer to:

- Apodytes dimidiata, native to southern Africa
- Pyrus × bretschneideri, the Chinese white pear
