= Pyrus regelii =

Conservation status
- Least Concern (IUCN 3.1)

Scientific classification
- Kingdom: Plantae
- Clade: Tracheophytes
- Clade: Angiosperms
- Clade: Eudicots
- Clade: Rosids
- Order: Rosales
- Family: Rosaceae
- Genus: Pyrus
- Species: P. regelii

Binomial name
- Pyrus regelii Rehder

Species of flowering plant

Pyrus regelii is a species of wild pear in the family Rosaceae, native to Central Asia (except Uzbekistan, where it occurs but is considered introduced). A small tree usually 6 m (20 ft) tall, but reaching 9 m (30 ft), its young branches are cloaked in a grey down, which provides visual interest when it is planted as an ornamental. Its leaves, which are also downy when young, are exceptionally variable in shape, sometimes even on the same individual. The fruit are small but typical pears, and are collected and eaten by local peoples. The most xerophytic member of its genus, it is occasionally used as a rootstock for cultivated pear trees, as a garden ornamental, and for reforestation projects, all in dry areas.
