= Pyrus glabra =

- Preserved P. glabra specimen

Scientific classification
- Kingdom: Plantae
- Clade: Tracheophytes
- Clade: Angiosperms
- Clade: Eudicots
- Clade: Rosids
- Order: Rosales
- Family: Rosaceae
- Genus: Pyrus
- Species: P. glabra

Binomial name
- Pyrus glabra Boiss.

Species of flowering plant

Pyrus glabra, (Persian: انچوچک, referring to the seeds), is a species of wild pear native to Iran. Preferring to grow in the Zagros Mountains at about 2,000 m (6,600 ft) above sea level, it is a small, spiny tree, typically 4.6 m (15 ft) tall, reaching 7.8 m (26 ft). The plant is said to exude a sweet substance called manna of Luristan, which is collected by locals and consumed. Due to its small habitat, Pyrus glabra is at a high risk of extinction relative to other wild Iranian pears.

Its fruit are heavy with tannins and very sour, but are still gathered in the wild for the vegetable oil in the seeds, which are larger than typical pear seeds. The oil keeps for a long time and is high in omega-6 fatty acids. It can also be used to make biodiesel.
