= Pyrus hopeiensis =

Scientific classification
- Kingdom: Plantae
- Clade: Embryophytes
- Clade: Tracheophytes
- Clade: Spermatophytes
- Clade: Angiosperms
- Clade: Eudicots
- Clade: Rosids
- Order: Rosales
- Family: Rosaceae
- Genus: Pyrus
- Species: P. hopeiensis

Binomial name
- Pyrus hopeiensis T.T.Yu

Synonyms
- Pyrus hopeiensis var. peninsula D.K.Zang & W.D.Peng

Species of flowering plant

Pyrus hopeiensis is a species of wild pear in the family Rosaceae, native to north-central China. It is a naturally occurring hybrid of other Chinese Pyrus species, but is it unclear which ones are its parents. Its fruits are small and bitter, so it is not valued or conserved by locals.
