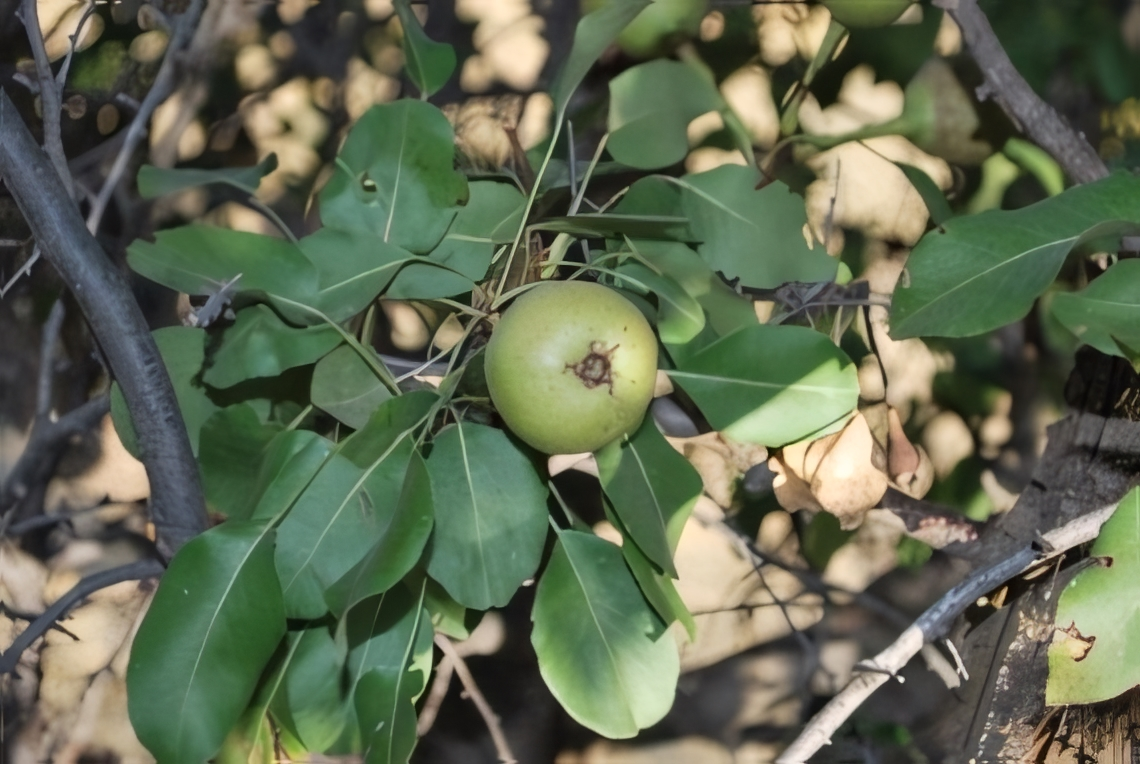

Conservation status
- Data Deficient (IUCN 2.3)

Scientific classification
- Kingdom: Plantae
- Clade: Tracheophytes
- Clade: Angiosperms
- Clade: Eudicots
- Clade: Rosids
- Order: Rosales
- Family: Rosaceae
- Genus: Pyrus
- Species: P. hakkiarica

Binomial name
- Pyrus hakkiarica Browicz

= Pyrus hakkiarica =

Species of pear tree

Pyrus hakkiarica (Turkish: Çölemerik ahlatı) is a species of wild pear in the family Rosaceae. It is endemic to the Hakkari area of Turkey, and is assessed as data deficient on the IUCN Red List.

== Description ==
Pyrus hakkiarica is a small, thorny tree reaching up to about 5 m in height. Young shoots are hairless (glabrous), while branches bear stout spines. Leaves are broadly ovate, variable even on the same plant, typically up to 7 cm long and 4–5 cm wide, with margins that may be entire or lightly crenate to serrate. Both surfaces of the leaf are smooth and green, and the leaf base is usually cordate (heart‑shaped) but may sometimes appear rounded. Petioles measure 2.5–5 cm in length. Flowers appear in clusters of one to three, each developing into a single pyriform (pear‑shaped) fruit up to 3 cm in diameter; the fruit retains its calyx lobes and is borne on a thick stalk 3–5 cm long Wikipedia.

Analysis of the mineral content of P. hakkiarica has found the fruit higher than other pears in sodium, potassium, calcium, magnesium, and iron.

== Habitat and distribution ==
This species is known only from montane scrub and open woodland in and around the Hakkâri Province of Turkey, typically on well‑drained slopes within a subtropical continental climate. Its restricted range and specialised habitat contribute to its uncertain conservation status.

== Taxonomy ==
Pyrus hakkarica was first described by the Polish chorologist and taxonomist Kazimierz Browicz in 1972, based on material collected by Peter Hadland Davis on 16 June 1966 at 1550 m elevation on the road from Şemdinli to Yüksekova in Hakkâri Province, Turkey.
