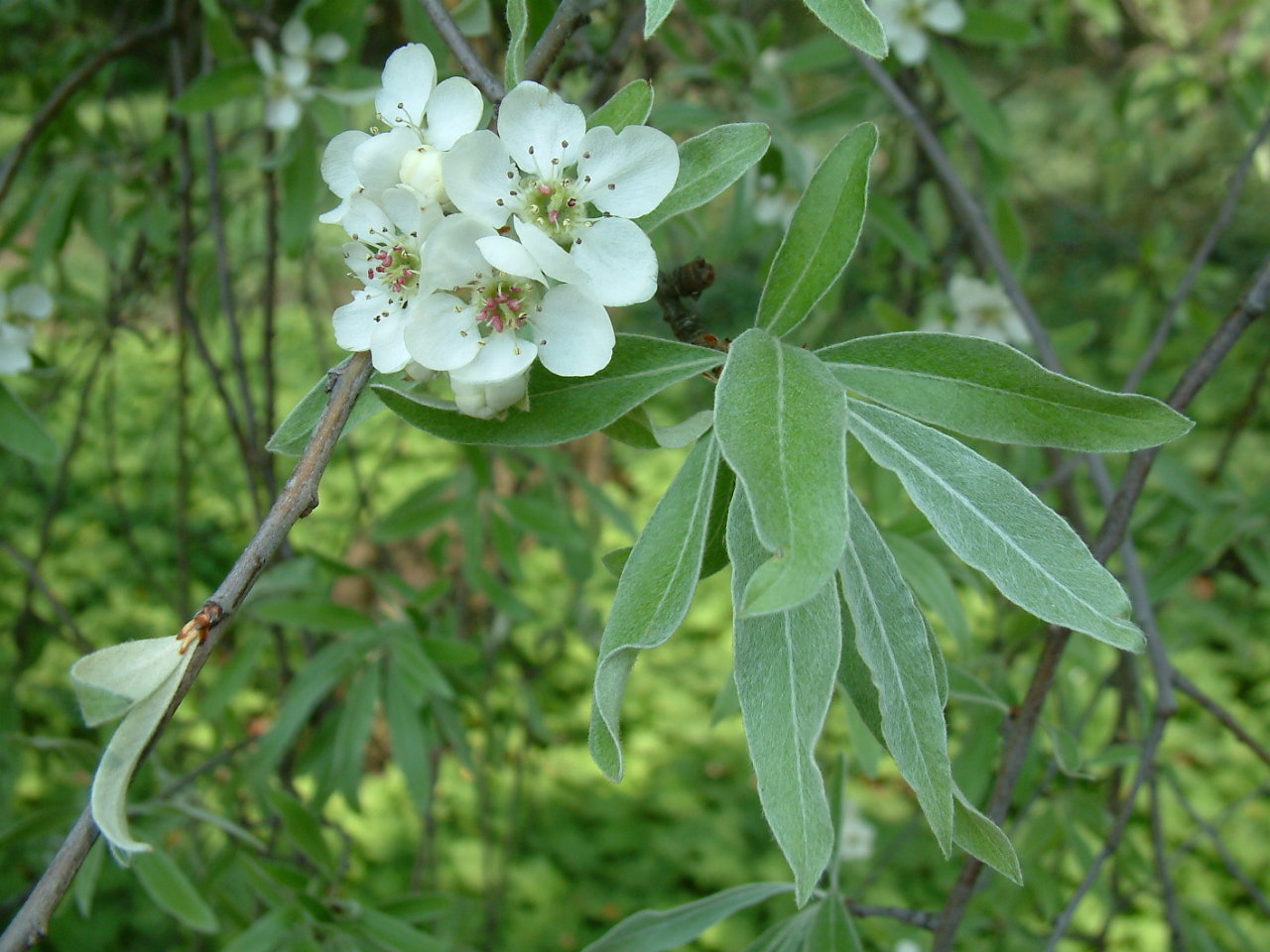

Conservation status
- Near Threatened (IUCN 2.3)

Scientific classification
- Kingdom: Plantae
- Clade: Tracheophytes
- Clade: Angiosperms
- Clade: Eudicots
- Clade: Rosids
- Order: Rosales
- Family: Rosaceae
- Genus: Pyrus
- Species: P. salicifolia

Binomial name
- Pyrus salicifolia Pall.

= Pyrus salicifolia =

Species of pear tree

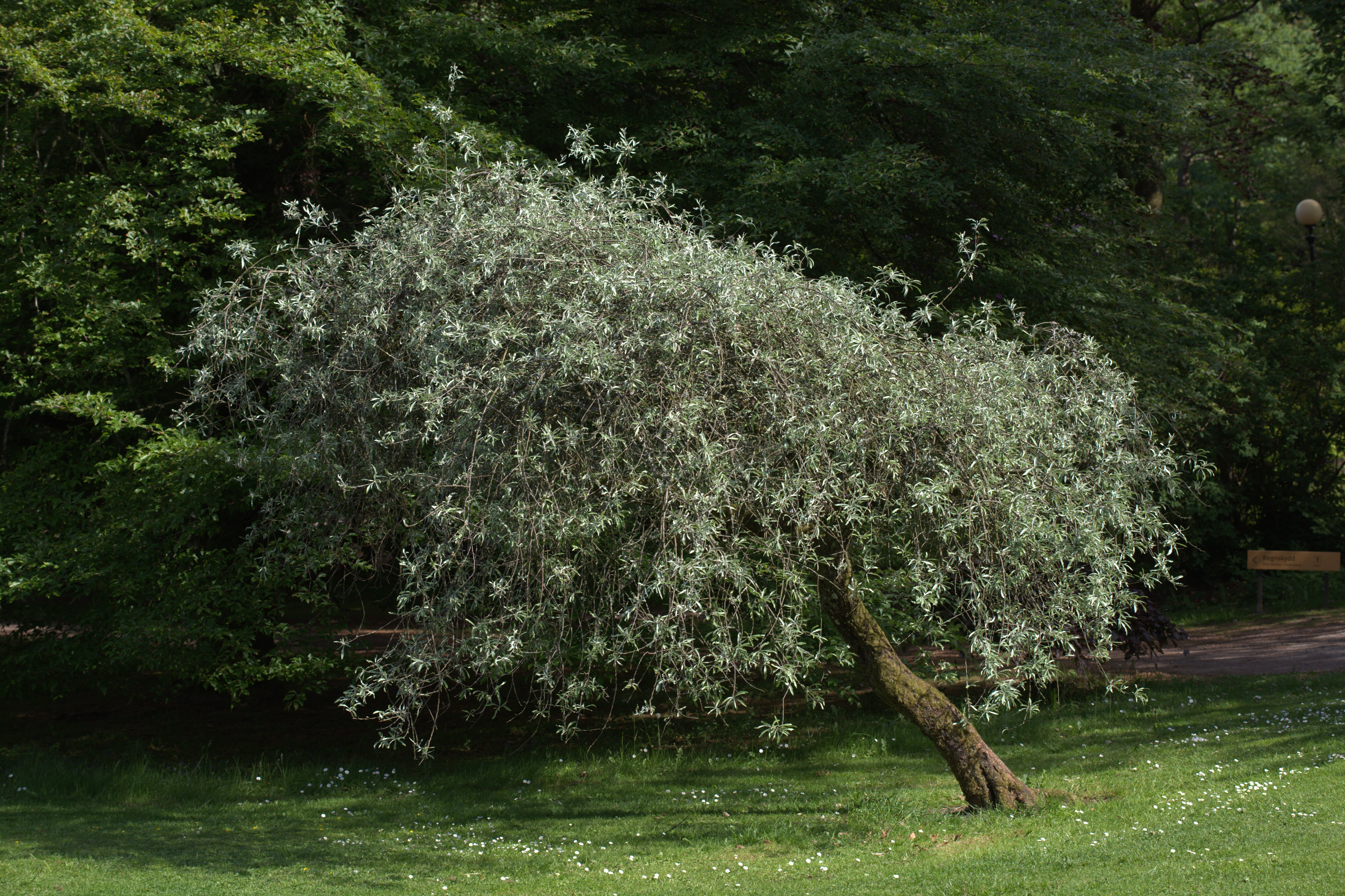
The whole tree

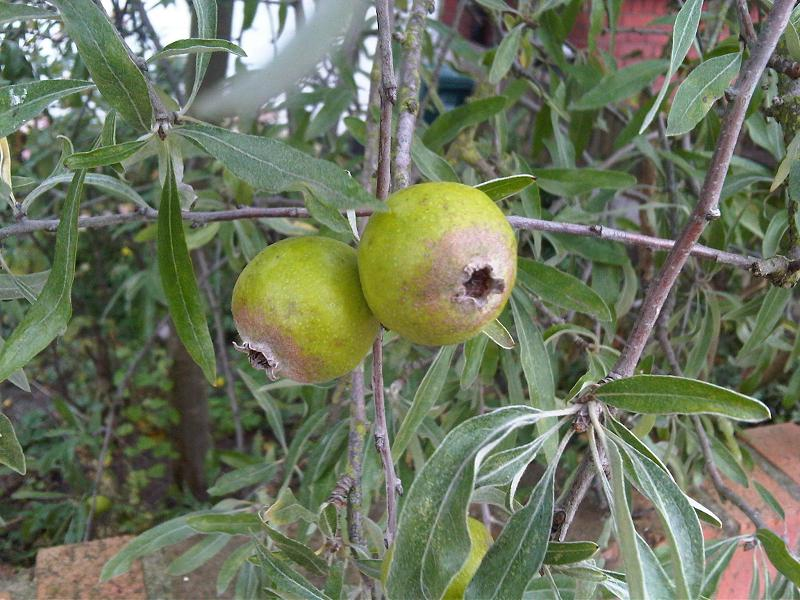
The fruit

Pyrus salicifolia is a species of pear, native to the Middle East. It is widely grown as an ornamental tree, almost always as a pendulous (or "weeping") cultivar, and is called by various common names, including willow-leaved pear, weeping pear, and similar. The tree is deciduous and of comparatively small stature, rarely reaching 10–12 meters in height. The crown is rounded. It has pendulous, silvery foliage, superficially similar to a weeping willow. The flowers are large and pure white highlighted with black-tipped stamens although the buds are tipped with red. The small green fruits are inedible, being hard and astringent.

This tree is cultivated widely in gardens and landscapes. It grows well on infertile sandy soils due to its spreading root system. The trees flower in the spring, but during the rest of the year can be trimmed back and shaped almost like topiary. This species of tree is very susceptible to fireblight, a bacterial pathogen.

Pyrus salicifolia may also be confused with Pyrus nivalis which is generally taller and hardly pendulous or with Pyrus elaeagnifolia which has broader entire leaves and longer petioles.

The cultivar 'Pendula' has gained the Royal Horticultural Society's Award of Garden Merit.
