= Harovin Sundown =

Pear cultivar

Harovin Sundown pear
- Genus: Pyrus
- Species: Pyrus communis
- Cultivar: 'Harovin Sundown'
- Origin: Canada

The Harovin Sundown pear (Pyrus communis L.) is a late-season fresh market pear with good storage capability. It is highly productive with no biennial bearing. The tree has excellent resistance to fire blight (a bacterial disease incited by Erwinia amylovora). This new cultivar, developed by Agriculture and Agri-Food Canada (AAFC) at its Research Centers in Harrow and Vineland Station, Ontario, Canada, is recommended by the Ontario Tender Fruit Producers' Marketing Board for general planting in Ontario. It is protected under Canadian Plant Breeders Rights legislation (application number 08-6315).
