= Pyrus pseudopashia =

Scientific classification
- Kingdom: Plantae
- Clade: Embryophytes
- Clade: Tracheophytes
- Clade: Spermatophytes
- Clade: Angiosperms
- Clade: Eudicots
- Clade: Rosids
- Order: Rosales
- Family: Rosaceae
- Genus: Pyrus
- Species: P. pseudopashia

Binomial name
- Pyrus pseudopashia T.T.Yu

Species of flowering plant

Pyrus pseudopashia is a species of wild pear in the family Rosaceae, native to south-central China. As a crop wild relative of pears, it is in urgent need of conservation. Unfortunately all its accessions in the USDA-ARS National Pyrus Collection appear to have been misidentified or mislabeled.
