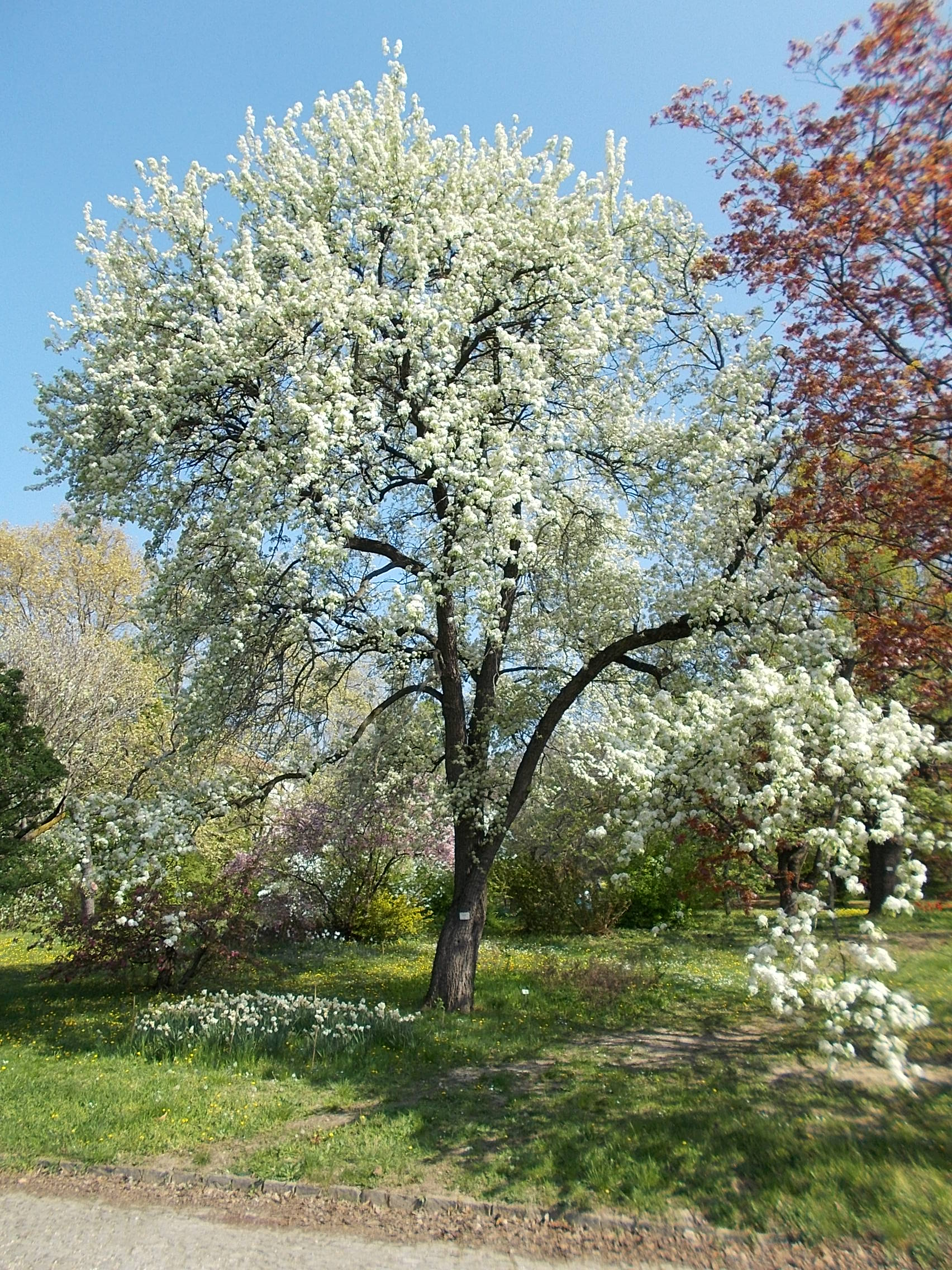

Scientific classification
- Kingdom: Plantae
- Clade: Tracheophytes
- Clade: Angiosperms
- Clade: Eudicots
- Clade: Rosids
- Order: Rosales
- Family: Rosaceae
- Genus: Pyrus
- Species: P. betulifolia

Binomial name
- Pyrus betulifolia Bunge

Synonyms
- Aria betulifolia (Bunge) M. J. Roem. Malus betulifolia (Bunge) Wenzig; Sorbus betulifolia (Bunge) Schau.

= Pyrus betulifolia =

Species of pear tree

Pyrus betulifolia, known as the birchleaf pear in English and tang li in Chinese, is a deciduous wild pear tree native to the leafy forests of northern and central China and Tibet. It can grow 10 meters high in optimal conditions. Formidable thorns (which are modified stems) protect its leaves from predation. These narrow and extended leaves, resembling smaller birch leaves, provide it with its specific name betulifolia, meaning "birch leaf". Its small fruit (5–11 mm (0.20–0.43 in) in diameter) are used as ingredients in types of rice wine in China and sake in Japan. It is used as rootstock for grafting popular Asian pear varieties.
