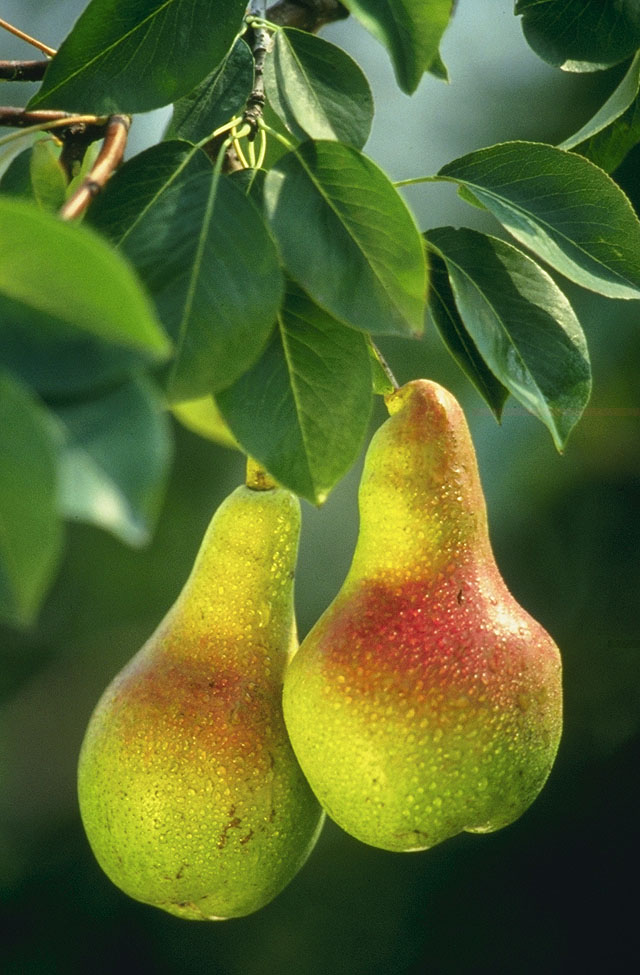
- European pear branch with two pears
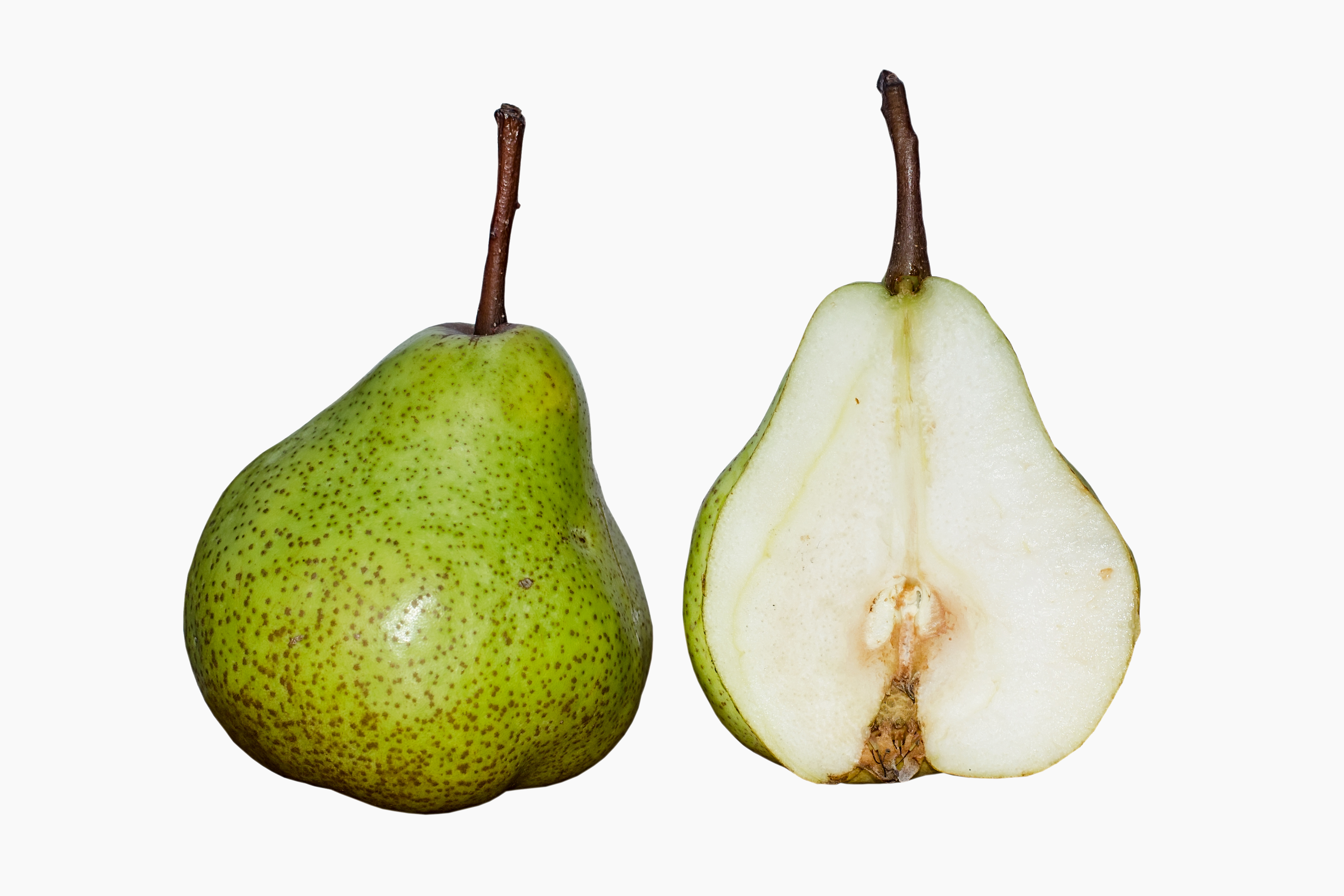
- Pear fruit cross section

Scientific classification
- Kingdom: Plantae
- Clade: Tracheophytes
- Clade: Angiosperms
- Clade: Eudicots
- Clade: Rosids
- Order: Rosales
- Family: Rosaceae
- Subfamily: Amygdaloideae
- Tribe: Maleae
- Subtribe: Malinae
- Genus: Pyrus; L.

Species
- About 30 species; see text

= Pear =

Edible fruits from the genus Pyrus

Pears are a genus of trees, Pyrus /ˈpaɪrəs/, in the family Rosaceae, that bear an edible apple-like fruit of the same name. Several species of pears are cultivated for their fruit and juices, while others are grown as ornamental flowering trees.

Pear trees are mostly medium to small-sized, though some grow as shrubs. They grow in temperate regions, being native to Asia and distributed across Europe and the mountains of North Africa. The wood of pear trees is a preferred material in the manufacture of high-quality woodwind instruments and furniture.

About 3,000 varieties of pears are grown worldwide, varying in both shape and taste. In 2024, world production of the fruit was about 28 million tonnes, led by China with 76% of the total. The fruit is consumed fresh, canned, as juice, dried, or fermented as perry.

== Etymology ==
The word pear comes from Old English pere or peru, from Vulgar Latin pera, from Latin pirum, probably akin to Greek άπιον apion with the same meaning. The source is most likely an ancient Mediterranean language, perhaps Semitic. The classical Latin word for a pear tree is pirus; pyrus is an alternate form of this word sometimes used in medieval Latin.

== Description ==
Pears are mostly small or medium-sized trees; a few of the species are shrubby, and some are thorny. The leaves are alternately arranged, simple, 2–12 cm (1–4 1/2 in) long, glossy green on some species, densely silvery-hairy in some others; leaf shape varies from broad oval to narrow lanceolate. Most pears are deciduous, but one or two species in Southeast Asia are evergreen. Some pears are cold-hardy, withstanding temperatures as low as −25 to −40 °C (−13 to −40 °F) in winter, but many grown for agriculture are vulnerable to cold damage. Evergreen species only tolerate temperatures down to about −12 °C (10 °F).

The flowers are white, rarely tinted yellow or pink, 2–4 centimetres (1–1 1/2 in) diameter, and have five petals, five sepals, and numerous stamens. Like that of the related apple, the pear fruit is a pome, in most wild species 1–4 cm (1/2–1 1/2 in) diameter, but in some cultivated forms up to 18 cm (7 in) long and 9 cm (3 1/2 in) broad. The shape varies in most species from oblate or globose, to the classic pyriform 'pear shape' of the European pear with an elongated basal portion and a bulbous end.

The fruit is a pseudofruit composed of the greatly swollen receptacle or upper end of the flower stalk (the so-called calyx tube). Enclosed within its cellular flesh is the true fruit: 2–5 'cartilaginous' carpels, known colloquially as the "core". Pears and apples cannot always be distinguished by the form of the fruit; some cultivated pears look very much like some apples, e.g. the nashi pear.

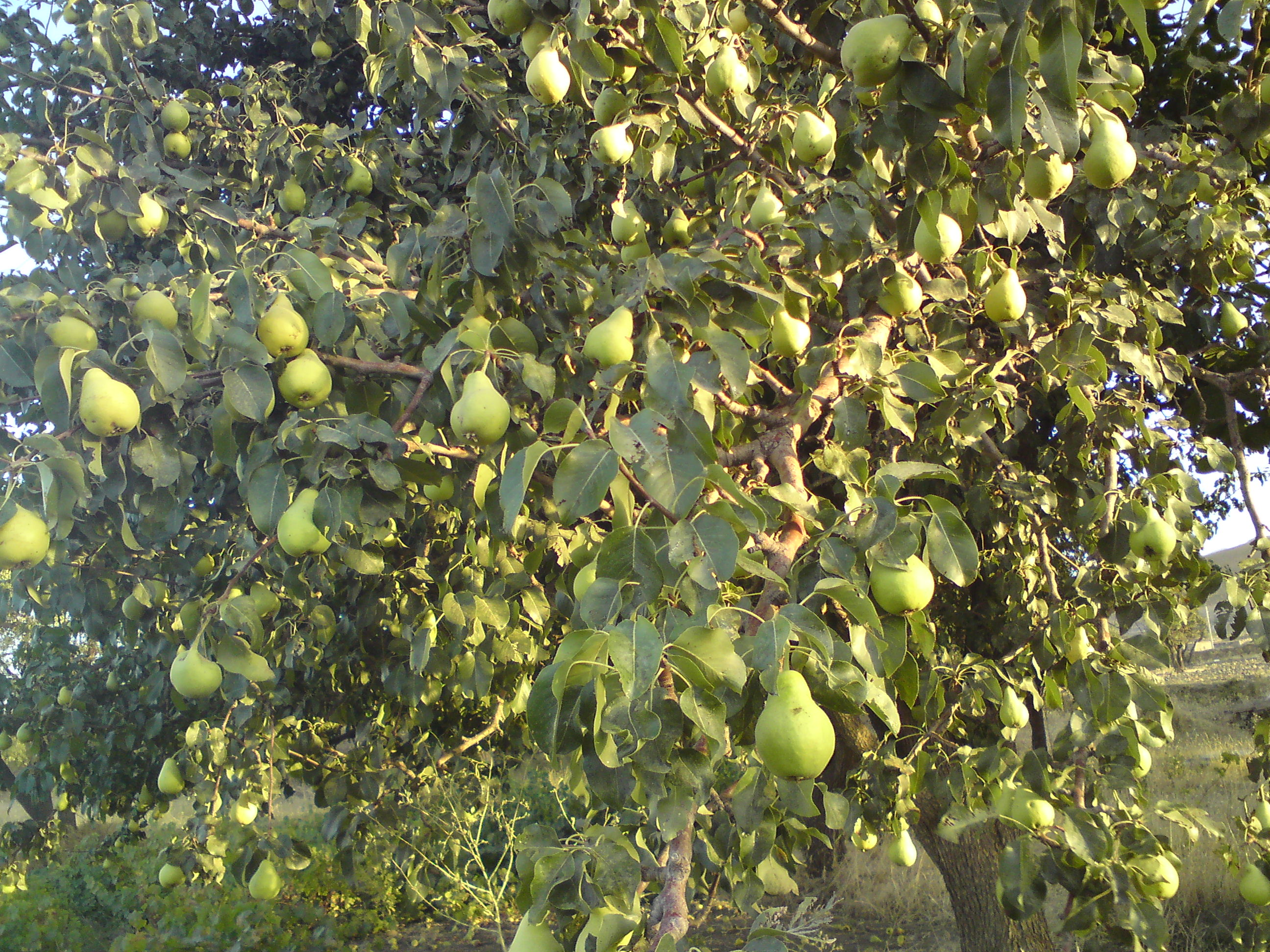
Tree

Pear morphology

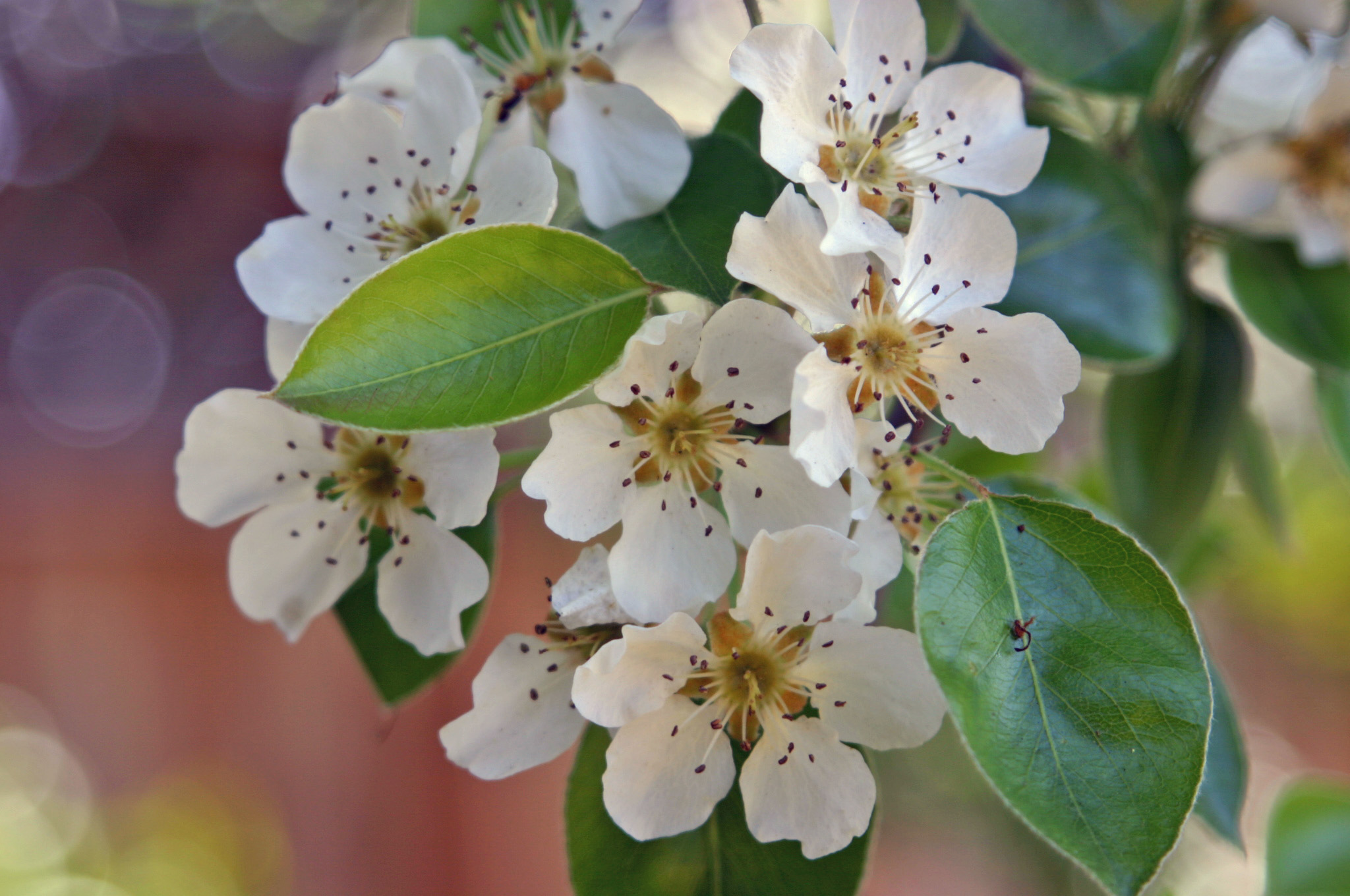
Pear blossoms

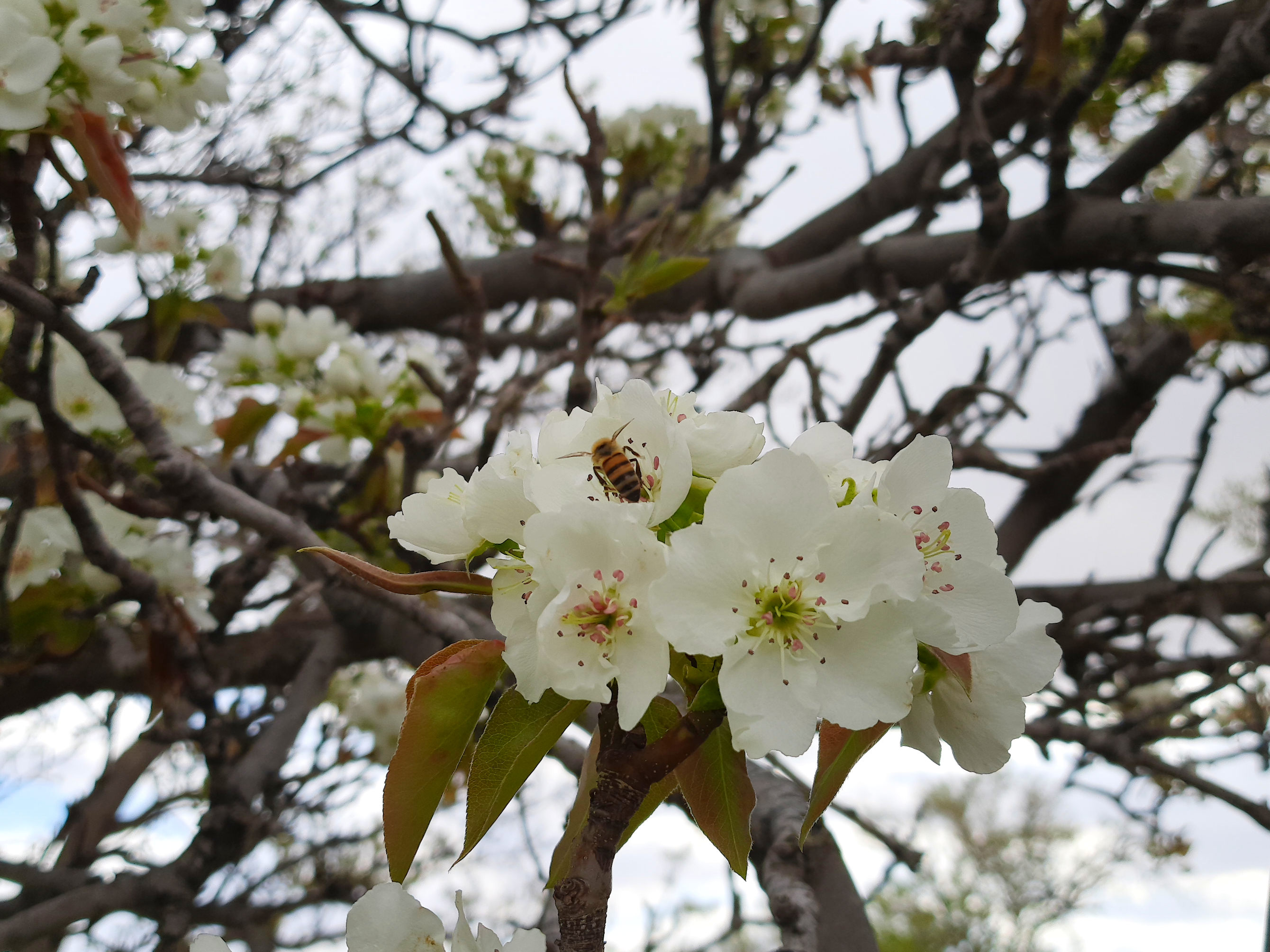
A bee pollinating a pear blossom

== History ==
=== Origins and distribution ===
The genus is generally thought to have originated in Central Asia. More specifically, it is thought to have originated in the foothills of the Tian Shan, a mountain range in present-day Western China, and to have spread to the north and south along mountain chains, evolving into a diverse group of over 20 widely recognized primary species. There are two domestication centres for pear one being in China and the other being located in Asia Minor near the Caucasus Mountains.

The word pear, or its equivalent, occurs in all the Celtic languages, while in Slavic and other dialects, differing appellations still referring to the same thing are found—a diversity and multiplicity of nomenclature, which led Alphonse Pyramus de Candolle to infer a very ancient cultivation of the tree from the shores of the Caspian to those of the Atlantic.

Pears are distributed across Europe, in the mountains of North Africa, and temperate regions of Asia.

=== Cultivation ===
Pear cultivation in temperate climates extends to the remotest antiquity, with evidence of its use as a food since prehistoric times. Many traces have been found in prehistoric pile dwellings around Lake Zurich. Pears were cultivated in China as early as 2000 BC. An article on pear tree cultivation in Spain is included in Ibn al-'Awwam's 12th-century agricultural work, Book on Agriculture.

The enormous number of varieties of the cultivated European pear (Pyrus communis subsp. communis), are likely derived from one or two wild subspecies (P. c. subsp. pyraster and P. c. subsp. caucasica), widely distributed throughout Europe, and sometimes forming part of the natural vegetation of the forests. Court accounts of Henry III of England record pears shipped from La Rochelle-Normande and presented to the king by the sheriffs of the City of London. The French names of pears grown in English medieval gardens suggest that their reputation, at the least, was French; a favoured variety in the accounts was named for Saint Rieul of Senlis, Bishop of Senlis in northern France.

Asian species with medium to large edible fruit include P. pyrifolia, P. ussuriensis, P. × bretschneideri, and P. × sinkiangensis. Small-fruited species, such as Pyrus calleryana, may be used as rootstocks for the cultivated forms.

The pear was cultivated by the Romans, who ate the fruits raw or cooked, just like apples. They introduced the fruit to Britain. Pliny's Natural History recommended stewing the fruit with honey and noted three dozen varieties. The Roman cookbook De re coquinaria has a recipe for a spiced, stewed-pear patina, or soufflé.

Pyrus nivalis, which has white down on the undersurface of the leaves, is chiefly used in Europe in the manufacture of perry, a drink similar to cider. Other small-fruited pears, distinguished by their early ripening and globose fruit, may be referred to as P. cordata, a species found wild in southwestern Europe.

== Taxonomy and distribution ==
The genus Pyrus was described by Carl Linnaeus in his Species Plantarum in 1753. The genus can be divided into two subgenera—Pyrus and Pashia. Subgenus Pyrus, the Occidental clade, is distributed mainly in the western portion of Eurasia and North Africa, while subgenus Pashia, the Oriental clade, is native to East Asia. The two subgenera come in contact in Xinjiang, China, and in fact P. sinkiangensis appears to have arisen from a hybridisation event between P. communis and either P. pyrifolia or P. bretschneideri, i.e. a hybridisation between a member of the Occidental clade and a member of the Oriental clade. Pears are cultivated across their native range, and are introduced for cultivation in North America, the British Isles, Scandinavia, Southern Africa, and Australia. As of December 2024, Plants of the World Online accepts the following 74 species.

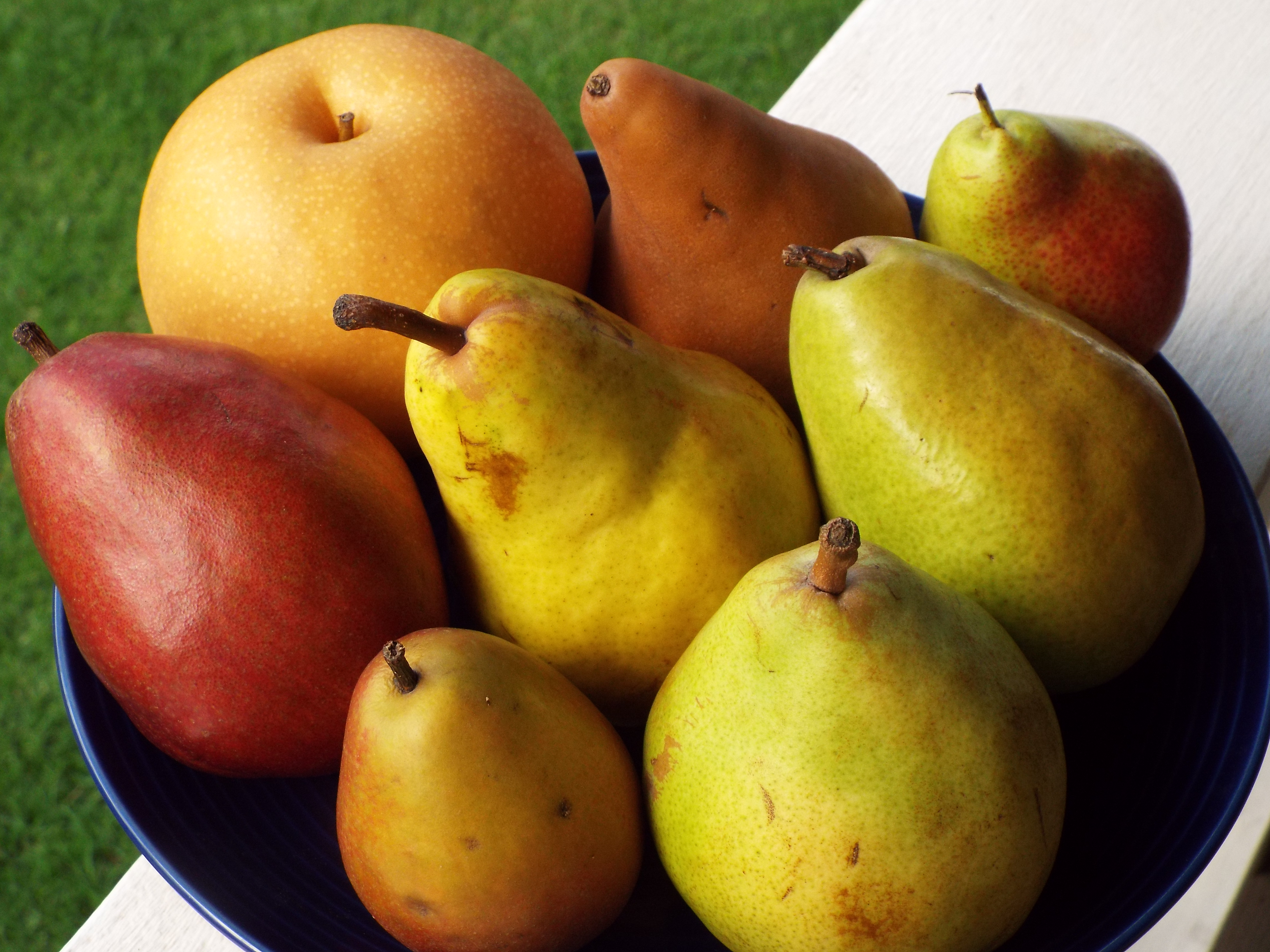
(Left to right, top to bottom) Korean, Bosc, Forelle, red D'Anjou, Bartlett, green D'Anjou, Seckel, Comice

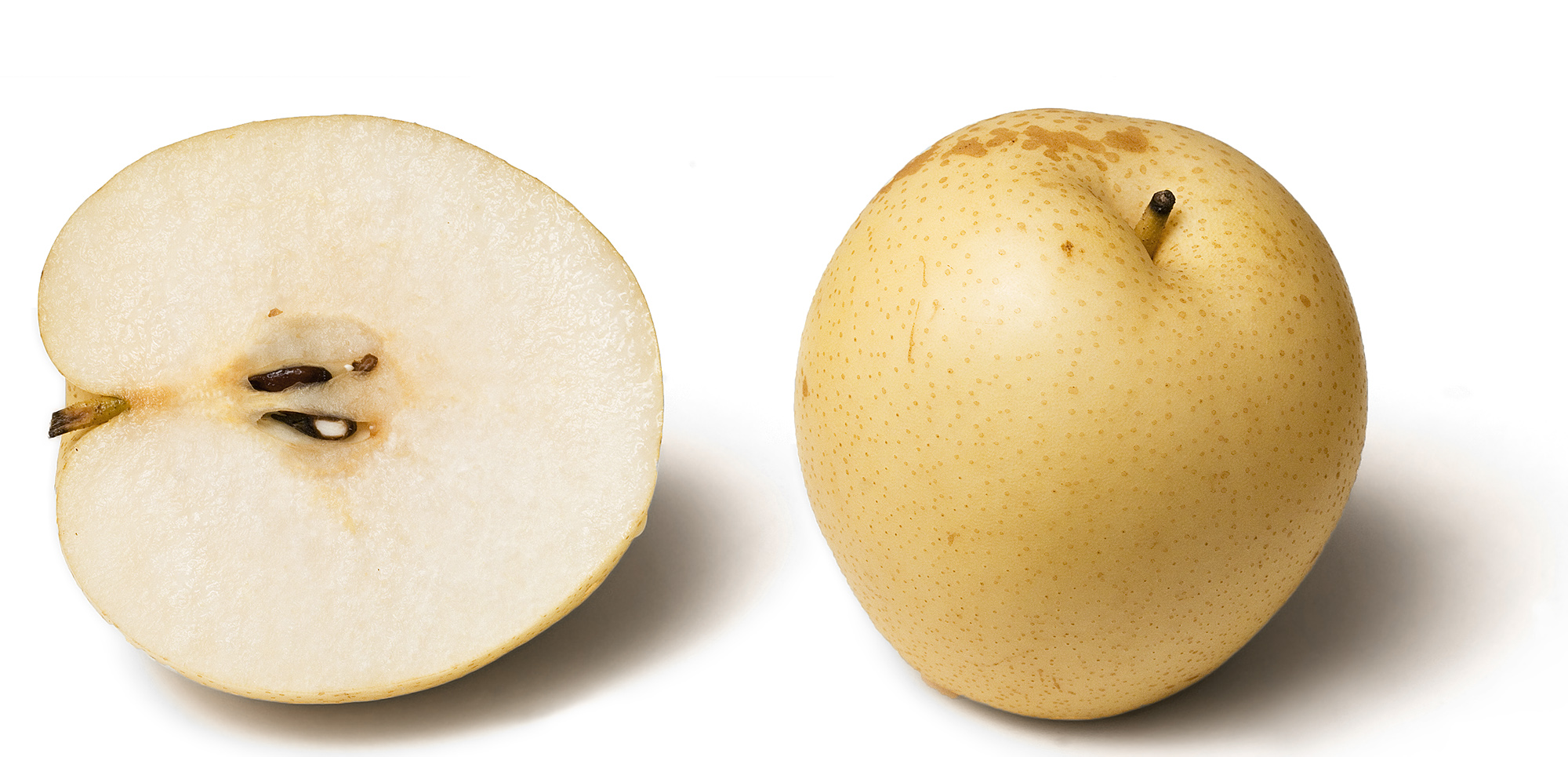
Varieties such as the Nashi pear are not "pear-shaped".

=== Species and selected hybrids ===
Subgenus Pyrus

- Pyrus acutiserrata
- Pyrus armeniacifolia—apricot-leaved pear
- Pyrus asiae-mediae
- Pyrus austriaca
- Pyrus × babadagensis
- Pyrus × bardoensis
- Pyrus boissieriana
- Pyrus bourgaeana—Iberian pear
- Pyrus browiczii
- Pyrus cajon
- Pyrus castribonensis
- Pyrus chosrovica
- Pyrus ciancioi—Ciancio's pear
- Pyrus communis—European pear
  - Pyrus communis subsp. communis—European pear (cultivars include Beurre d'Anjou, Bartlett and Beurre Bosc)
  - Pyrus communis subsp. caucasica (syn. Pyrus caucasica)
  - Pyrus communis subsp. pyraster (syn. Pyrus pyraster)
- Pyrus complexa
- Pyrus cordata—Plymouth pear
- Pyrus cordifolia
- Pyrus costata
- Pyrus daralagezi
- Pyrus demetrii
- Pyrus elaeagrifolia—oleaster-leaved pear
- Pyrus elata
- Pyrus eldarica
- Pyrus fedorovii
- Pyrus ferganensis
- Pyrus georgica
- Pyrus gergerana—Gergeranian pear
- Pyrus glabra
- Pyrus grossheimii
- Pyrus hajastani
- Pyrus hakkiarica
- Pyrus hyrcana
- Pyrus jacquemontiana
- Pyrus × jordanovii
- Pyrus ketzkhovelii
- Pyrus mazanderanica
- Pyrus medvedevii
- Pyrus megrica
- Pyrus × michauxii
- Pyrus neoserrulata
- Pyrus nivalis—snow pear
- Pyrus nutans
- Pyrus oxyprion
- Pyrus pedrottiana
- Pyrus raddeana
- Pyrus regelii
- Pyrus sachokiana
- Pyrus salicifolia—willow-leaved pear
- Pyrus sicanorum
- Pyrus × sinkiangensis—thought to be an interspecific hybrid between P. ×bretschneideri and Pyrus communis
- Pyrus sogdiana
- Pyrus sosnovskyi
- Pyrus spinosa—Almond-leaved pear
- Pyrus syriaca—Syrian pear
- Pyrus tadshikistanica
- Pyrus takhtadzhianii
- Pyrus tamamschiannae
- Pyrus terpoi
- Pyrus theodorovii
- Pyrus turcomanica
- Pyrus tuskaulensis
- Pyrus vallis-demonis
- Pyrus × vavilovii
- Pyrus voronovii
- Pyrus vsevolodovii
- Pyrus yaltirikii
- Pyrus zangezura

Subgenus Pashia

- Pyrus betulifolia—birchleaf pear
- Pyrus × bretschneideri—Chinese white pear; also classified as a subspecies of Pyrus pyrifolia
- Pyrus calleryana—Callery pear
- Pyrus hopeiensis
- Pyrus korshinskyi
- Pyrus pashia—Afghan pear
- Pyrus × phaeocarpa
- Pyrus pseudopashia
- Pyrus pyrifolia—Nashi pear, Sha Li; tree species native to China, Japan, and Korea, also known as the Asian pear
- Pyrus trilocularis
- Pyrus ussuriensis—Siberian pear (also known as the Ussurian pear, Harbin pear, or Manchurian pear)
- Pyrus xerophila

Not classified

- Pyrus alpinotaiwaniana

Together with the genus Crataegus, Pyrus forms the graft-chimaera + Pyrocrataegus.

== Cultivation ==
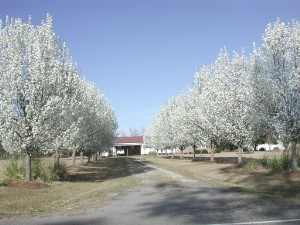
Orchard of Pyrus calleryana in flower

According to Pear Bureau Northwest, about 3,000 known varieties of pears are grown worldwide. The pear is normally propagated by grafting a selected variety onto a rootstock, which may be of a pear or quince variety. Quince rootstocks produce smaller trees, which is often desirable in commercial orchards or domestic gardens. For new varieties the flowers can be cross-bred to preserve or combine desirable traits. The fruit of the pear is produced on spurs, which appear on shoots more than one year old.

There are four species which are primarily grown for edible fruit production: the European pear Pyrus communis subsp. communis cultivated mainly in Europe and North America, the Chinese white pear (bai li) Pyrus × bretschneideri, the Chinese pear Pyrus ussuriensis, and the Nashi pear Pyrus pyrifolia (also known as Asian pear or apple pear), which are grown mainly in eastern Asia. There are thousands of cultivars of these three species. A species grown in western China, P. sinkiangensis, and P. pashia, grown in southern China and south Asia, are also produced to a lesser degree.

Other species are used as rootstocks for European and Asian pears and as ornamental trees. Pear wood is close-grained and has been used as a specialized timber for fine furniture and making the blocks for woodcuts. The Manchurian or Ussurian Pear, Pyrus ussuriensis (which produces unpalatable fruit primarily used for canning) has been crossed with Pyrus communis to breed hardier pear cultivars. The Bradford pear (Pyrus calleryana 'Bradford') is widespread as an ornamental tree in North America, where it has become invasive in regions. It is also used as a blight-resistant rootstock for Pyrus communis fruit orchards. The Willow-leaved pear (Pyrus salicifolia) is grown for its silvery leaves, flowers, and its "weeping" form.

Summer and autumn cultivars of Pyrus communis, being climacteric fruits, are harvested before they are fully ripe, while they are still green, but snap off when lifted. Certain other pears, including Pyrus pyrifolia and P. × bretschneideri, have both climacteric and non-climacteric varieties.

=== Cultivars ===
The following cultivars have gained the Royal Horticultural Society's Award of Garden Merit:

- 'Beth'
- 'Beurré Hardy'
- 'Beurré Superfin'
- 'Concorde'
- 'Conference'
- 'Doyenné du Comice'
- 'Joséphine de Malines'

The purely decorative cultivar P. salicifolia 'Pendula', with pendulous branches and silvery leaves, has also won the award.

== Production ==
Pear production 2024, millions of tonnes
China	21.0
Argentina	0.67
Turkey	0.63
South Africa	0.47
United States	0.46
Italy	0.44
World	27.6
Source: FAOSTAT

In 2024, world production of pears was 27.6 million tonnes, led by China with 76% of the total (table). About 48% of the Southern Hemisphere's pears are produced in the Patagonian valley of Río Negro in Argentina.

Production of pears

Pear yield

=== Storage ===
Pears may be stored at room temperature until ripe. Pears are ripe when the flesh around the stem gives to gentle pressure. Ripe pears are optimally stored refrigerated, uncovered in a single layer, where they have a shelf life of 2 to 3 days. Pears ripen at room temperature. Ripening is accelerated by the gas ethylene, a plant hormone. If pears are placed next to bananas in a fruit bowl, the ethylene emitted by the banana causes the pears to ripen. According to Pear Bureau Northwest, most varieties show little colour change as they ripen (though the skin on Bartlett pears changes from green to yellow).

== Uses ==
=== Nutrition ===
Pears, raw
Nutritional value per 100 g (3.5 oz)
- Energy: 239 kJ (57 kcal)
- Carbohydrates: 15.23 g
- Sugars sucrose glucose fructose: 9.75 g 0.71 g 2.6 g 6.42 g
- Dietary fibre: 3.1 g
- Fat: 0.14 g
- Protein: 0.36 g
Vitamins and minerals
Vitamins	Quantity %DV^{†}
Thiamine (B1)	1% 0.012 mg
Riboflavin (B2)	2% 0.026 mg
Niacin (B3)	1% 0.161 mg
Pantothenic acid (B5)	1% 0.049 mg
Vitamin B6	2% 0.029 mg
Folate (B9)	2% 7 μg
Choline	1% 5.1 mg
Vitamin C	5% 4.3 mg
Vitamin E	1% 0.12 mg
Vitamin K	4% 4.4 μg
Minerals	Quantity %DV^{†}
Calcium	1% 9 mg
Copper	9% 0.082 mg
Iron	1% 0.18 mg
Magnesium	2% 7 mg
Manganese	2% 0.048 mg
Phosphorus	1% 12 mg
Potassium	4% 116 mg
Sodium	0% 1 mg
Zinc	1% 0.1 mg
- Other constituents: Quantity
- Water: 84 g
- Link to USDA Database entry
- ^{†}Percentages estimated using US recommendations for adults, except for potassium, which is estimated based on expert recommendation from the National Academies.

Raw pear is 84% water, 15% carbohydrates and contains negligible protein and fat (table). In a 100 g (3 1/2 oz) reference amount, raw pear supplies 239 kilojoules (57 kilocalories) of food energy, a moderate amount of dietary fiber, and no micronutrients in significant amounts (table).

A 2019 review found preliminary evidence for the potential of pear consumption to favorably affect cardiovascular health.

=== Cooking ===
Pears are eaten fresh, canned, as juice, and dried. The juice can also be used in jellies and jams, usually in combination with other fruits, including berries. Fermented pear juice is called perry or pear cider and is made in a way that is similar to how cider is made from apples. Perry can be distilled to produce an eau de vie de poire, a colourless, unsweetened fruit brandy.

Pear purée is used to manufacture snack foods such as Fruit by the Foot and Fruit Roll-Ups.

The culinary or cooking pear is green but dry and hard, and only edible after several hours of cooking. Two Dutch cultivars are Gieser Wildeman (a sweet variety) and Saint Remy (slightly sour).

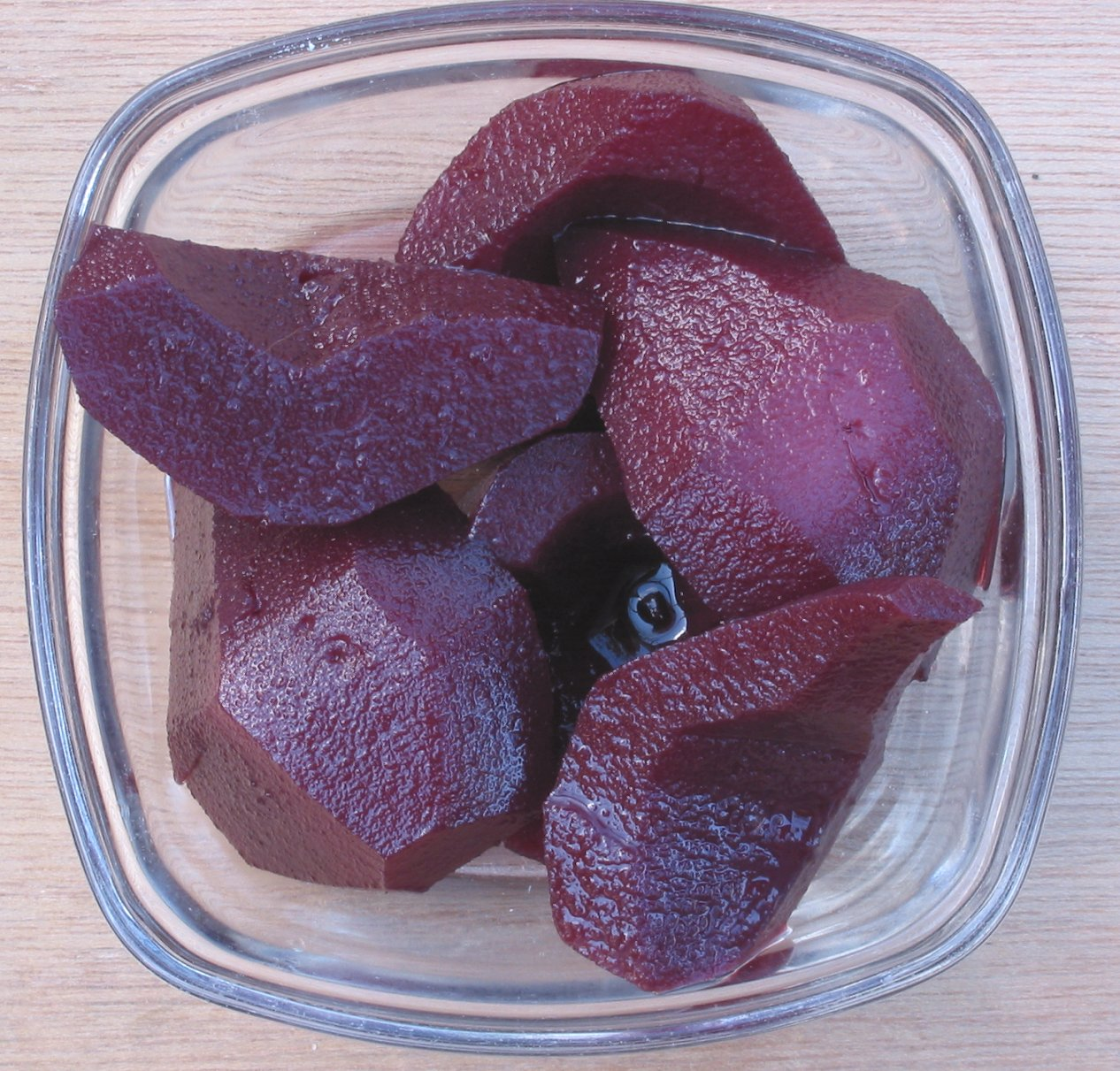
Pears simmered in red wine

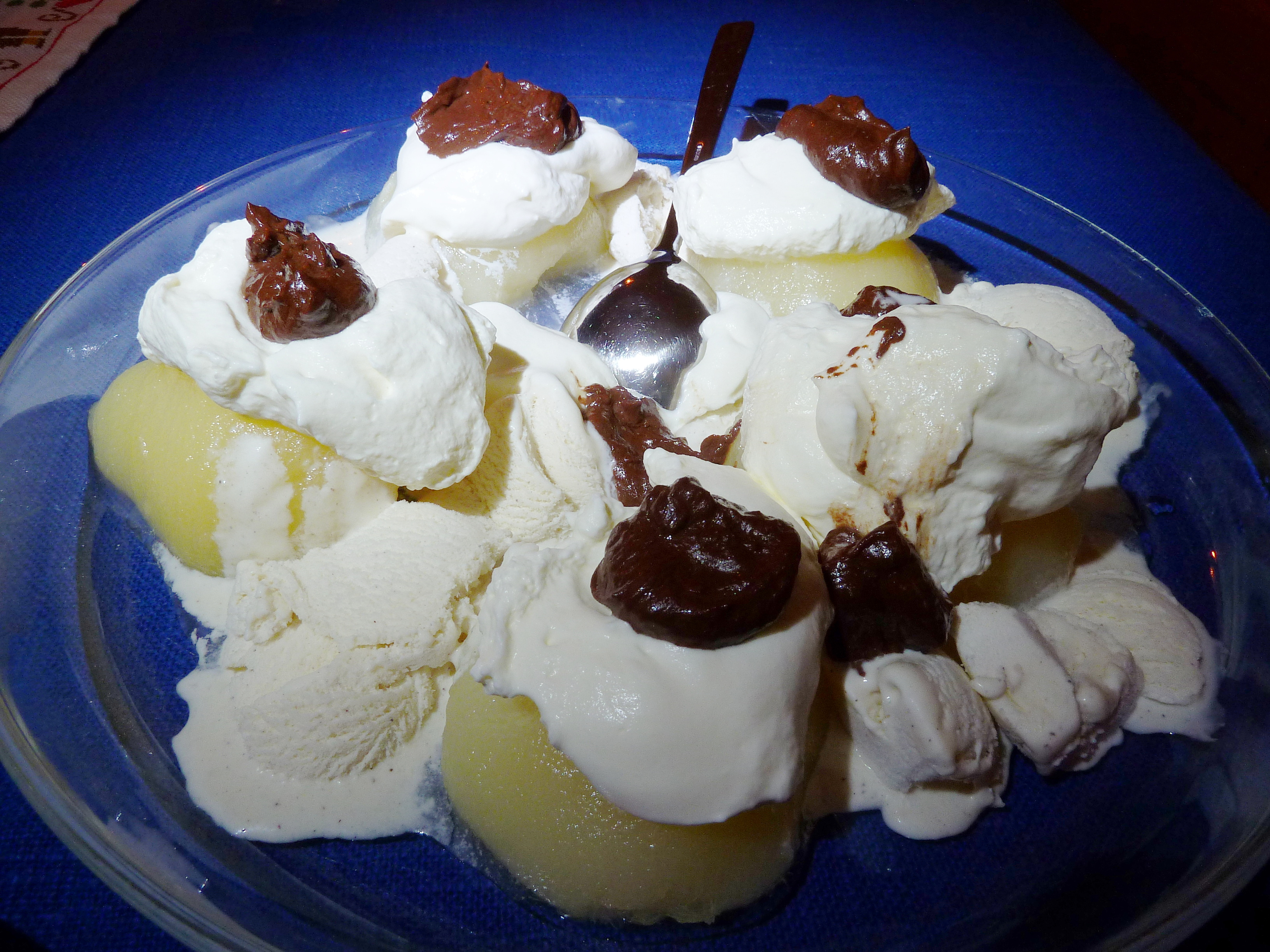
Poire belle Hélène, cooked pears with ice cream and chocolate sauce

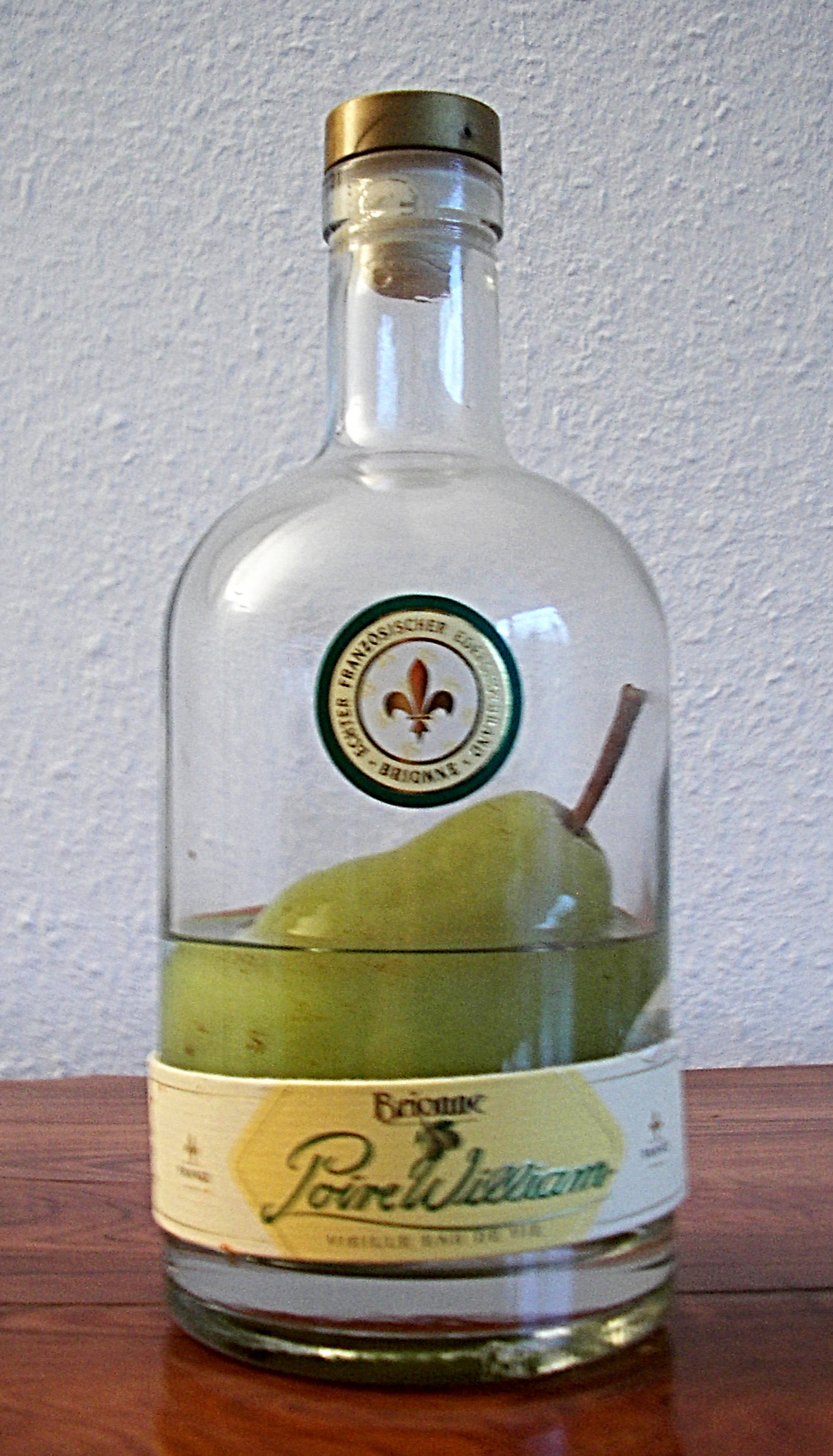
Poire Williams, a fruit brandy produced from the Williams pear. The bottle is tied to the tree and the pear is grown inside it.

Traditional stone mill for making perry at Hellens, Herefordshire. The varieties 'Hellens Early' and 'Hellens Green' were named after the house.

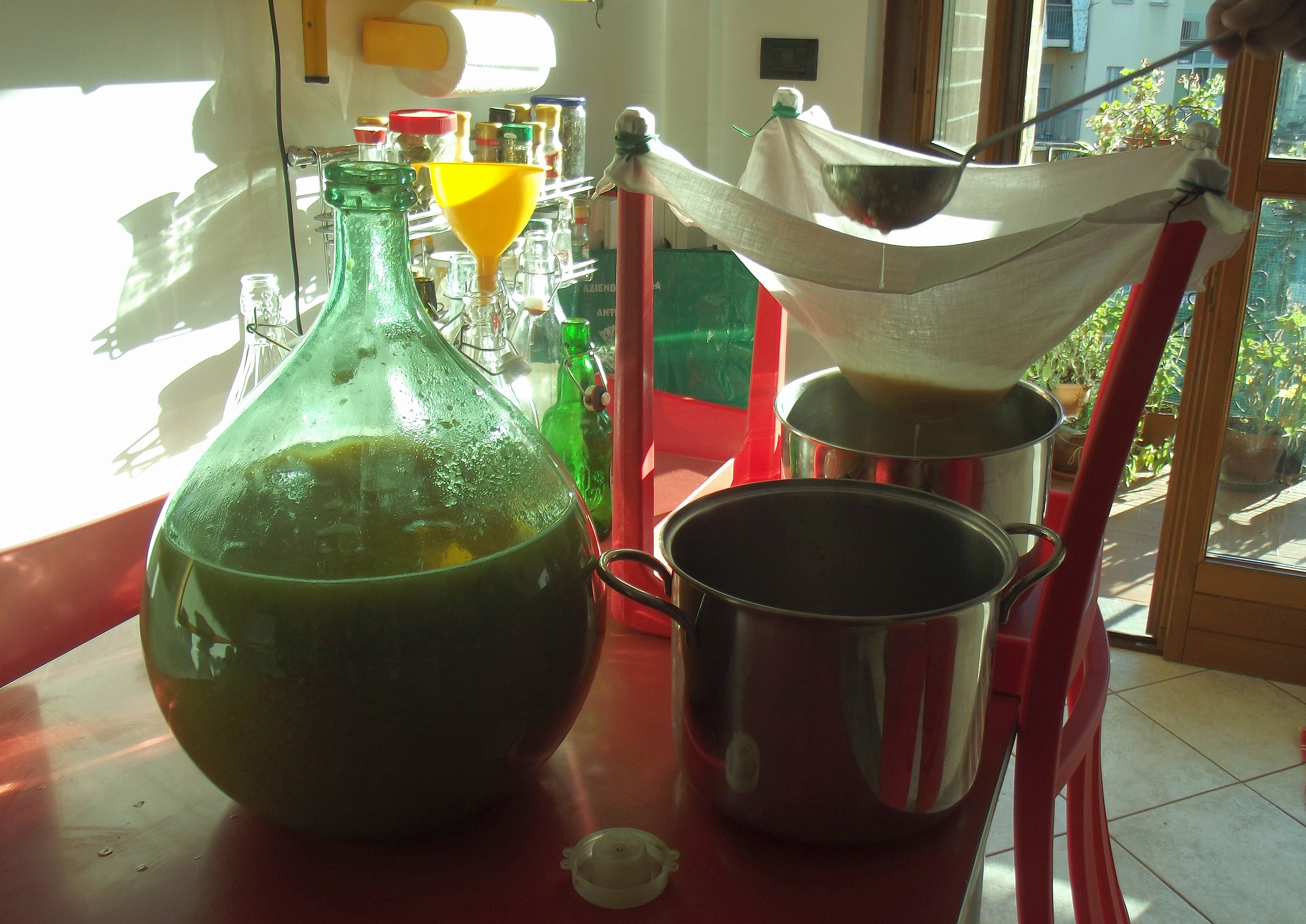
Filtering homemade perry

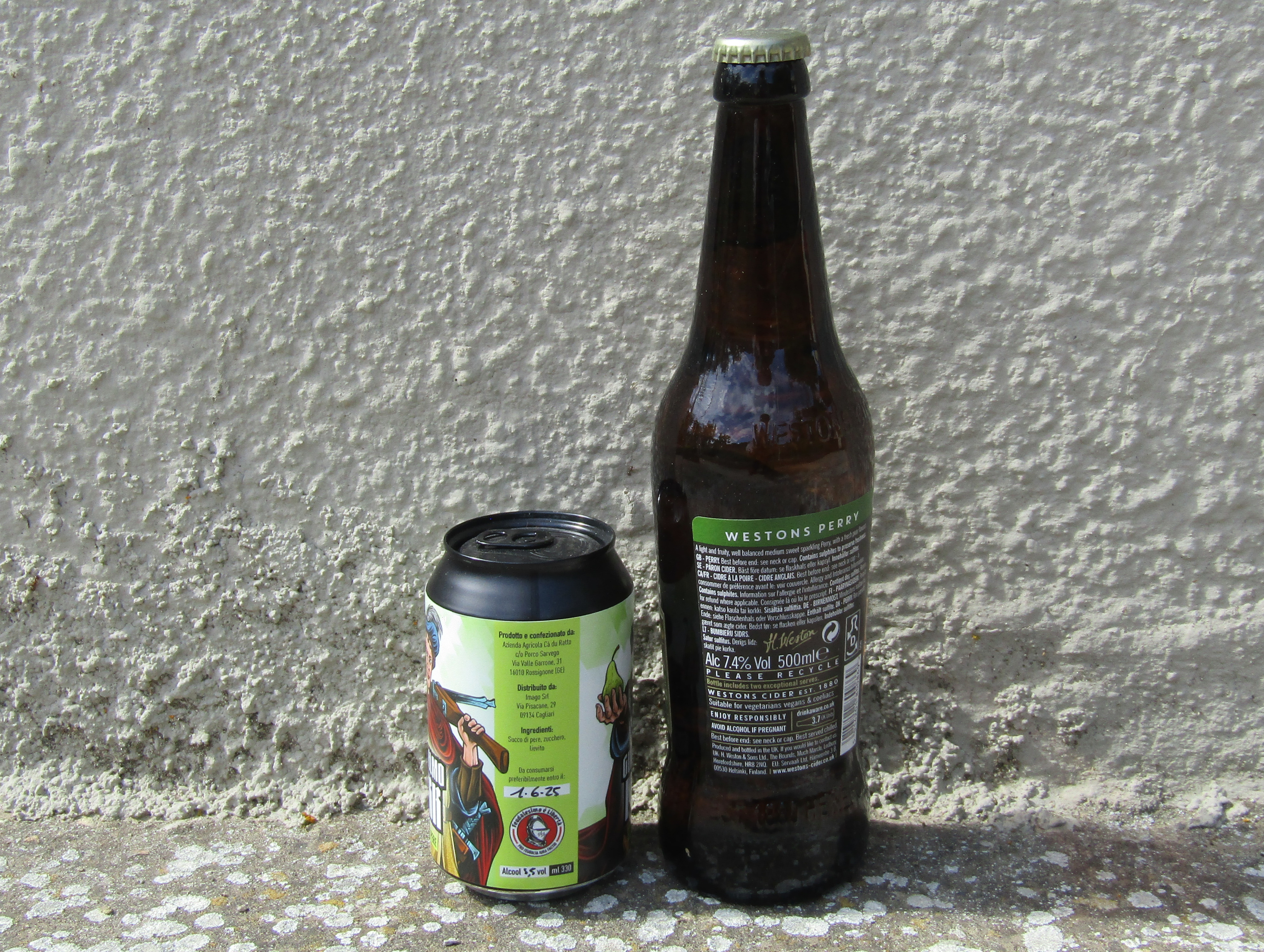
Commercial perry

=== Timber ===
Pear wood is one of the preferred materials in the manufacture of high-quality woodwind instruments and furniture, and was used for making the carved blocks for woodcuts. It is also used for wood carving, and as a firewood to produce aromatic smoke for smoking meat or tobacco. Pear wood is valued for kitchen spoons, scoops and stirrers, as it does not contaminate food with colour, flavour or smell, and resists warping and splintering despite repeated soaking and drying cycles. Lincoln describes it as "a fairly tough, very stable wood... (used for) carving... brushbacks, umbrella handles, measuring instruments such as set squares and T-squares... recorders... violin and guitar fingerboards and piano keys... decorative veneering." Pearwood is the favored wood for architect's rulers because it does not warp. It is similar to the wood of its relative, the apple tree (Malus domestica) and used for many of the same purposes.

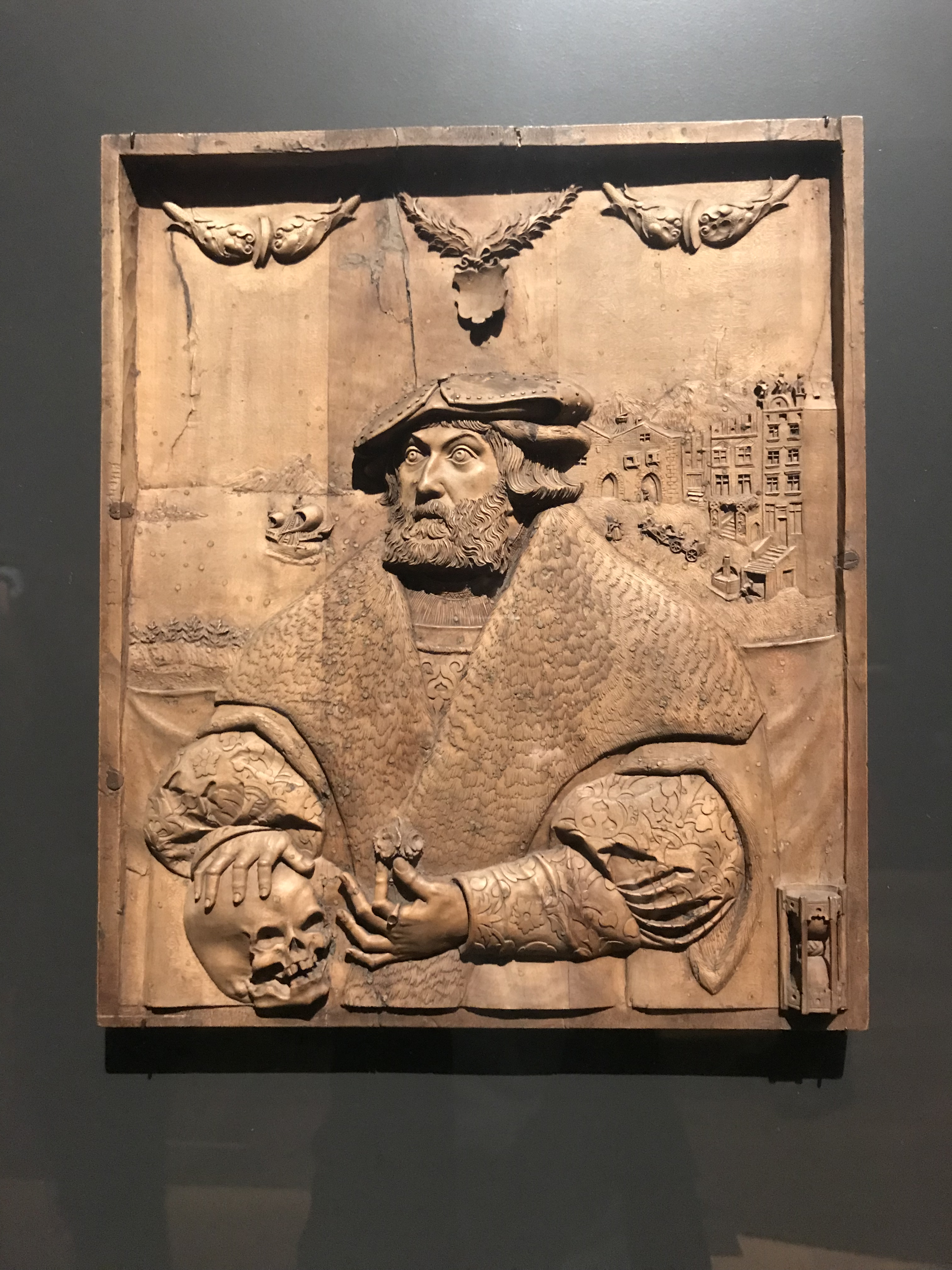
Relief sculpture portrait of Bartholomäus Welser in pearwood, c. 1530

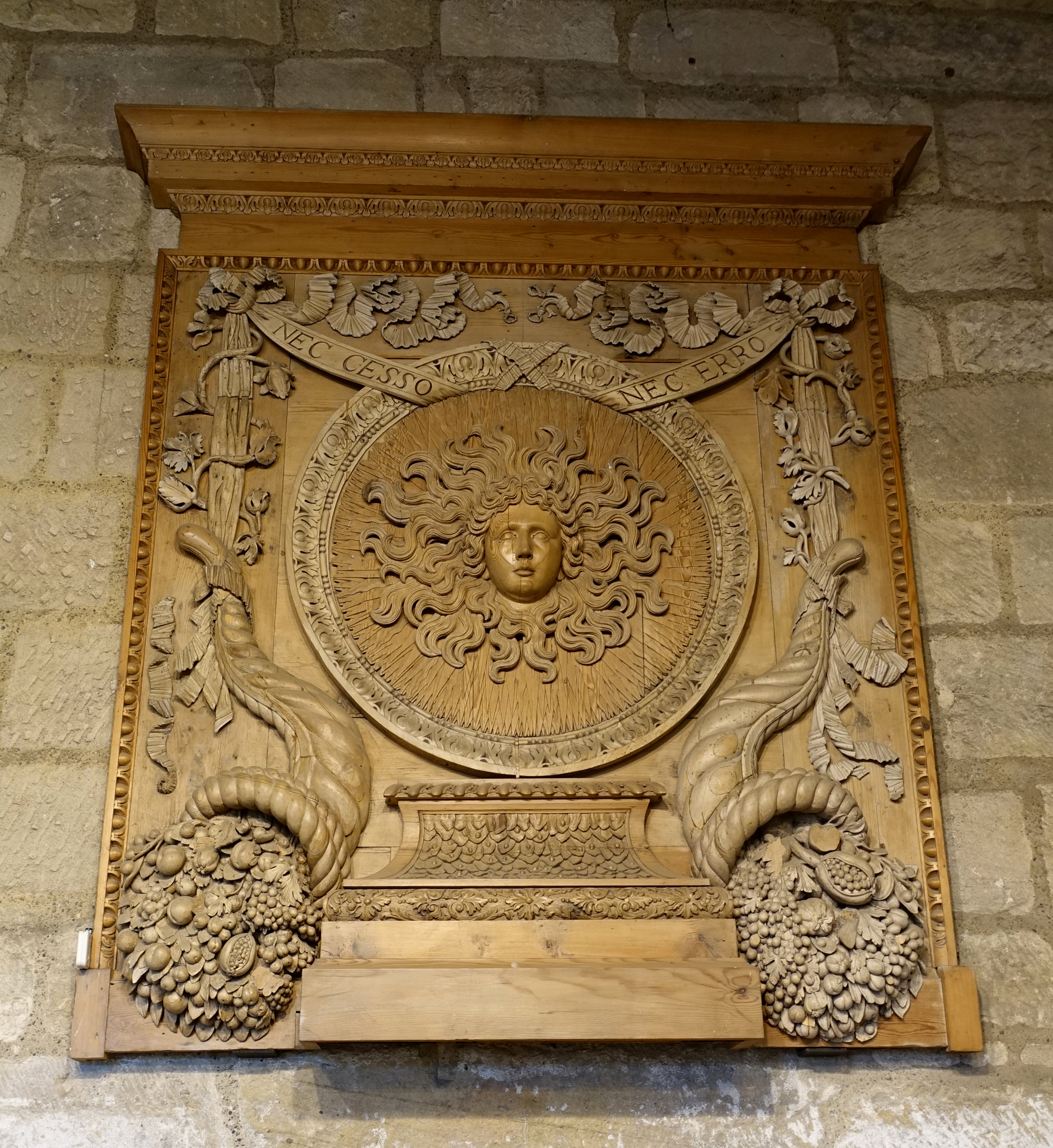
Overmantel, 1650-1750, pearwood, Fountains Hall, North Yorkshire

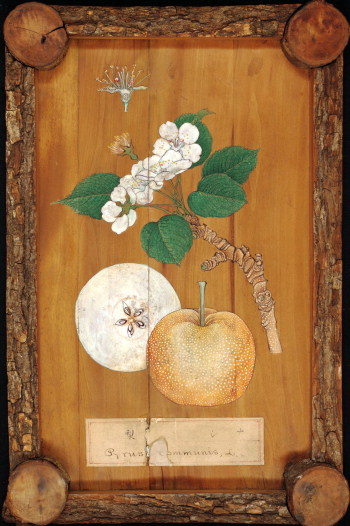
Japanese pearwood panel, Kew Gardens

== In culture ==
"A Partridge in a Pear Tree" is the first gift in the cumulative song "The Twelve Days of Christmas".

== See also ==
- List of culinary fruits
