= Asian pear =

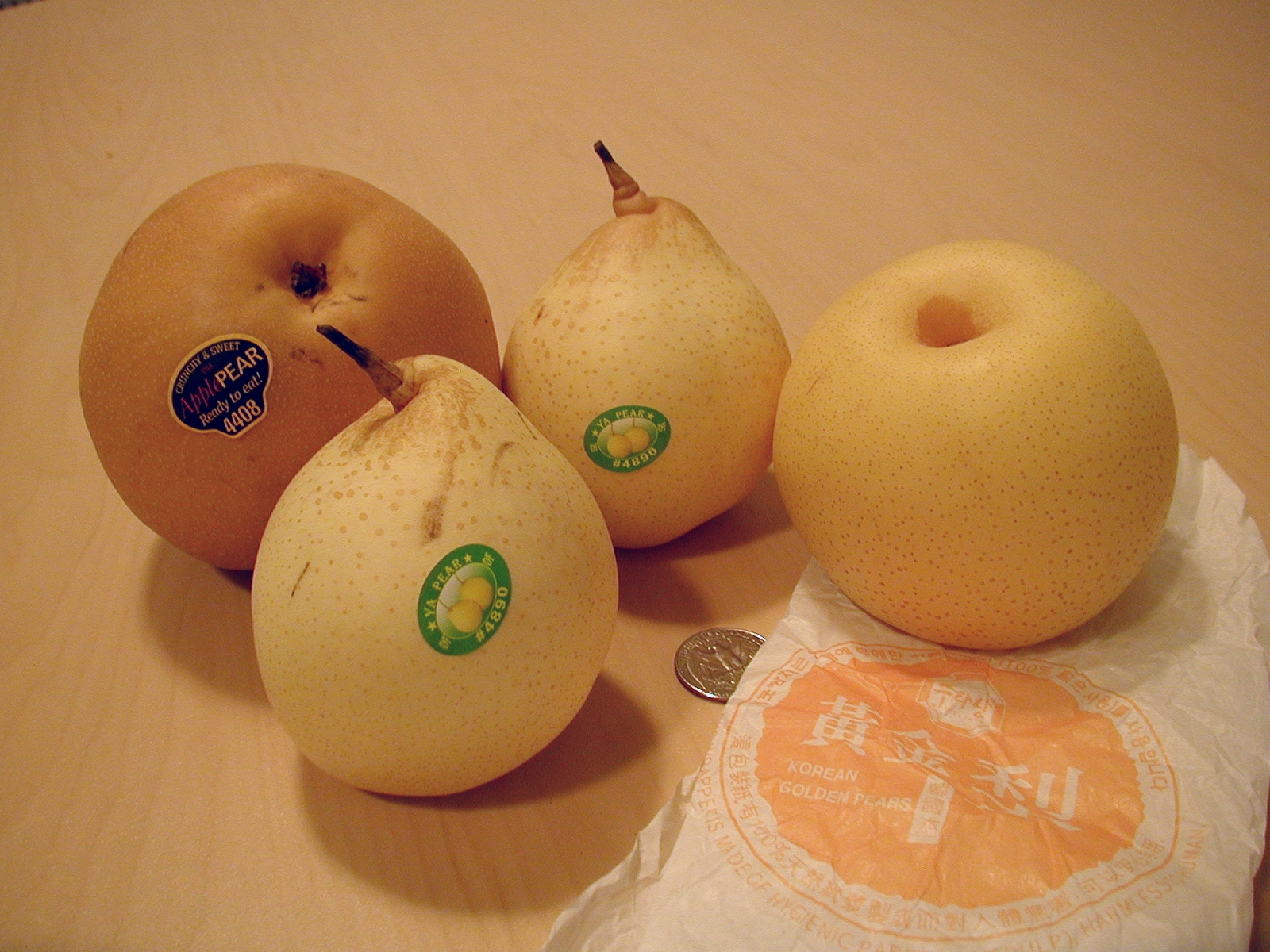
Asian pears, fruits of Pyrus pyrifolia on the left and right, and two fruits of Pyrus × bretschneideri in the center

Fruit commonly known as the Asian pear in different parts of the world :

- Pyrus pyrifolia, called “Korean pear”, “Japanese pear”, ”Chinese pear” or Nashi pear, usually round, with brown or yellow skin
- Pyrus × bretschneideri, called Ya pear or Chinese white pear, usually slightly elongated (shaped more like a European pear), with yellow skin.

== Released Varieties ==
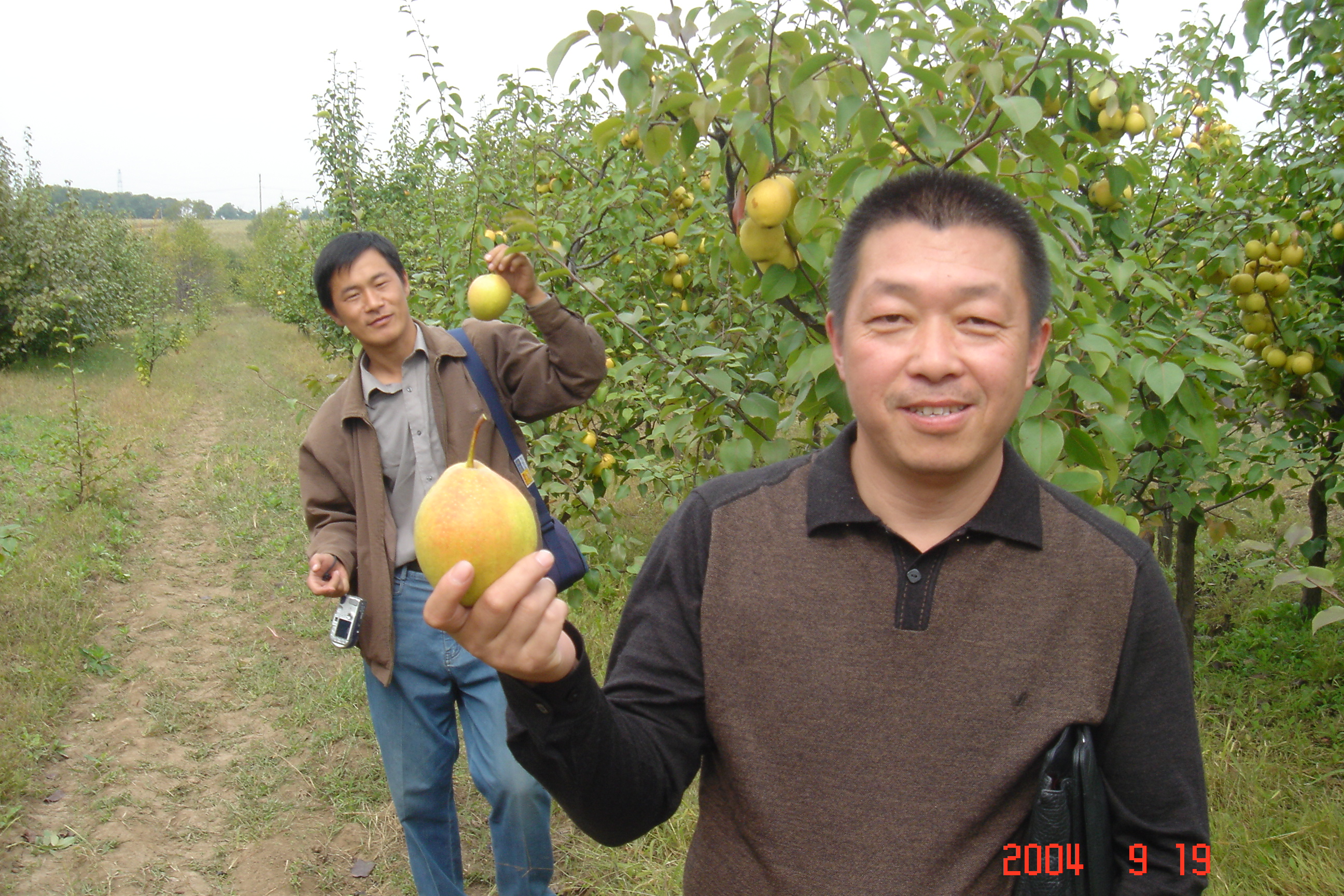
Maojun Zhang Chinese pear breeder

* Hanhong (Pyrus ussuriensis Maxim × P. bretschneideri Rehd.) is a winter hardy scab resistant (Venturia pirina Aderh) high-quality Asian pear with excellent firmness and crispness and a long shelf life. Hanhong Released through collaboration between Agriculture and Agri-Food Canada, Horticultural Research and Development Centre, Quebec and Pomology Institute Academy of Agriculture Science of Jilin Province, Gongzhuling, 136100, China
