= Pyrus armeniacifolia =

Apricot-leaved pear

Scientific classification
- Kingdom: Plantae
- Clade: Tracheophytes
- Clade: Angiosperms
- Clade: Eudicots
- Clade: Rosids
- Order: Rosales
- Family: Rosaceae
- Genus: Pyrus
- Species: P. armeniacifolia

Binomial name
- Pyrus armeniacifolia T.T.Yu

Species of pear tree

Pyrus armeniacifolia, also known as the apricot-leaved pear, is a species of plant in the family Rosaceae. It is known from northern Xinjiang, where it is cultivated near Tacheng.

The species was formally described by Tse Tsun Yu in 1963.
