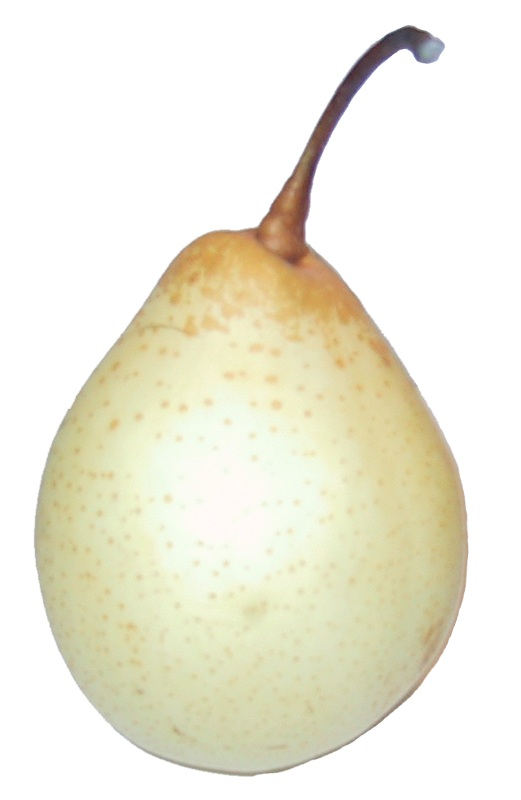

Scientific classification
- Kingdom: Plantae
- Clade: Embryophytes
- Clade: Tracheophytes
- Clade: Spermatophytes
- Clade: Angiosperms
- Clade: Eudicots
- Clade: Rosids
- Order: Rosales
- Family: Rosaceae
- Genus: Pyrus
- Species: P. × bretschneideri

Binomial name
- Pyrus × bretschneideri Rehder

= Pyrus × bretschneideri =

Chinese white pear

Species of tree

Pyrus × bretschneideri (or Pyrus bretschneideri), the ya pear or pearple or Chinese white pear (Chinese: 白梨; pinyin: báilí), is an interspecific hybrid species of pear native to North China, where it is widely grown for its edible fruit.

Recent molecular genetic evidence confirms some relationship to the Siberian pear (Pyrus ussuriensis), but it can also be classified as a subspecies of the Chinese pear Pyrus pyrifolia.

Along with cultivars of P. pyrifolia and P. ussuriensis, the fruit is also called the nashi pear. These very juicy, white to light yellow pears, unlike the round Nashi pears (P. pyrifolia) that are also grown in eastern Asia, are shaped more like the European pear (Pyrus communis), narrow towards the stem end. The “Ya Li” (Chinese: 鸭梨; pinyin: yālí), literally "duck pear" due to its mallard-like shape, is one cultivar widely grown in China and exported around the world. Ya pears taste similar to a mild Bosc pear, but are crisp, with a higher water content and lower sugar content.

== Further hybridization ==
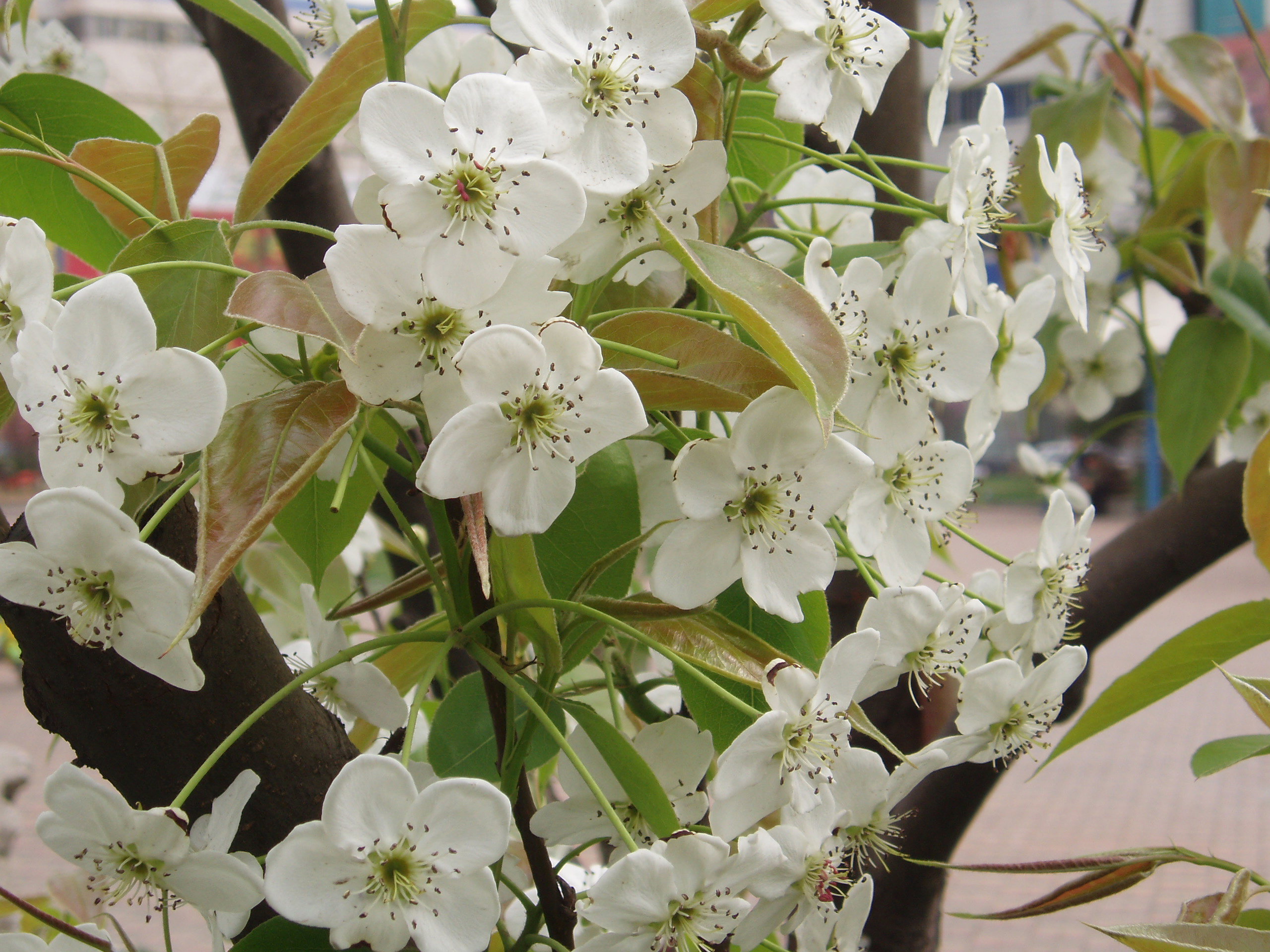
Chinese white pear flower

Breeding programs have created cultivars that are the products of further hybridizing P. × bretschneideri with P. pyrifolia. Under the International Code of Nomenclature for algae, fungi, and plants, such backcross hybrids are named within the species P. × bretschneideri. Cultivar 'PremP109', also called 'Prem 109', is such a hybrid, marketed under the trademark Papple.
