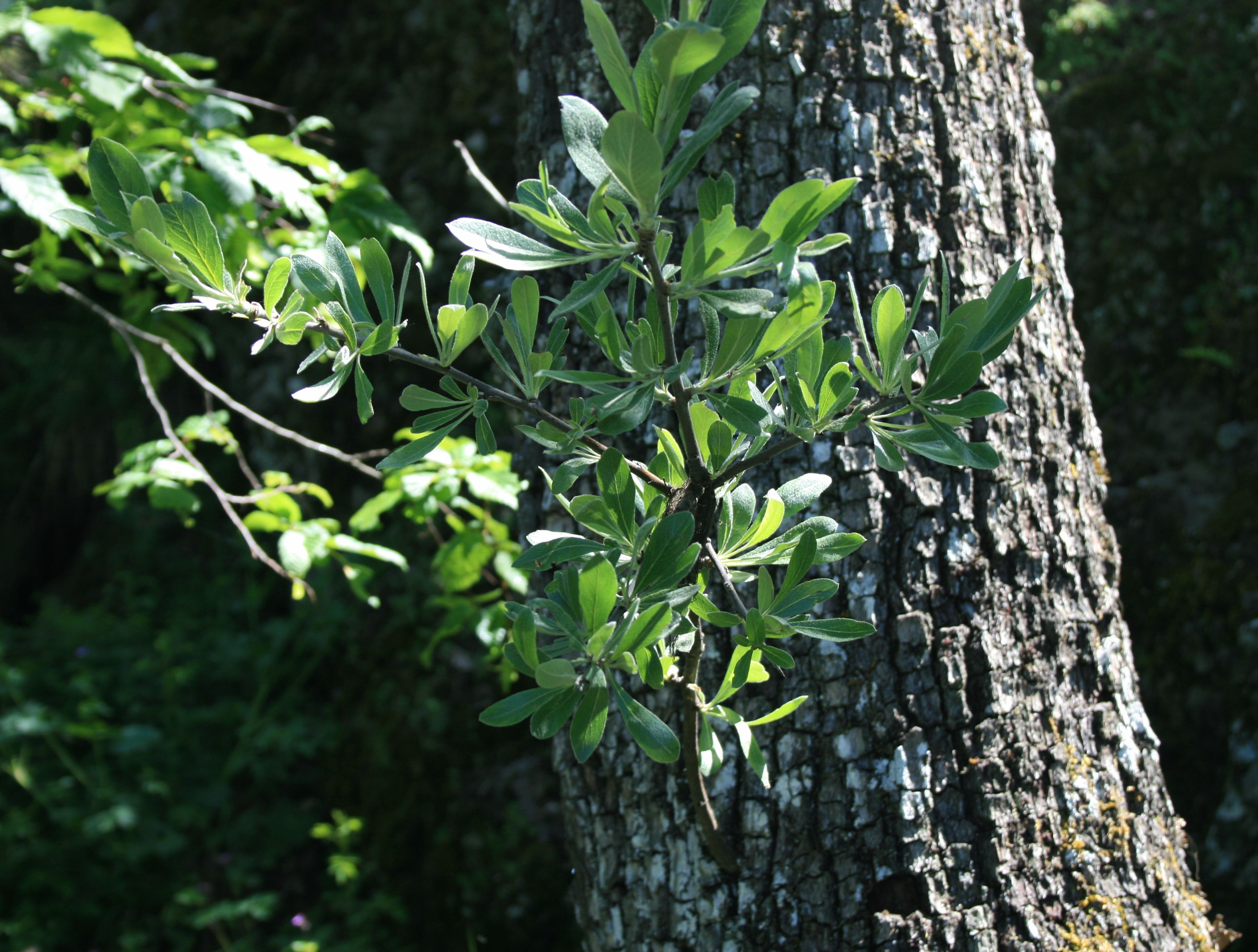
- Pyrus elaeagrifolia stem with leaves

Conservation status
- Data Deficient (IUCN 3.1)

Scientific classification
- Kingdom: Plantae
- Clade: Tracheophytes
- Clade: Angiosperms
- Clade: Eudicots
- Clade: Rosids
- Order: Rosales
- Family: Rosaceae
- Genus: Pyrus
- Species: P. elaeagrifolia

Binomial name
- Pyrus elaeagrifolia Pall.

= Pyrus elaeagrifolia =

Species of pear tree

Pyrus elaeagrifolia, the oleaster-leaved pear, is a species of wild pear plant in the genus Pyrus (Rosaceae), the specific name referring to the similarity of its foliage to that of Elaeagnus angustifolia - the so-called 'wild olive' or oleaster.

It is native to Albania, Bulgaria, Greece, Romania, Turkey, and Crimea. It prefers dry habitat and elevations up to 1,700 meters (5,600 ft). It grows to a height of 10 meters (33 ft). The flowers are hermaphrodite. The species is highly resistant to drought and frost. It is sympatric with Pyrus pyraster. The species was first described by Peter Simon Pallas in 1793.

== Varieties ==
Known subspecies are: Pyrus elaeagrifolia subsp. elaeagrifolia (no accessions), Pyrus elaeagrifolia subsp. kotschyana, Pyrus elaeagrifolia subsp. bulgarica, and Pyrus elaeagrifolia subsp. yaltirikii.
