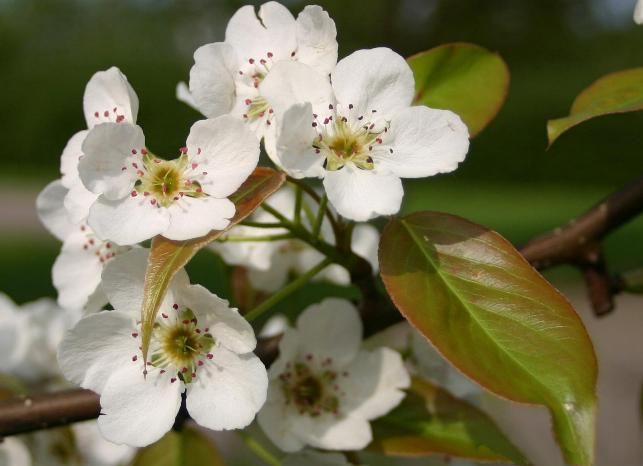
- P. ussuriensis buds, leaves, and flowers

Scientific classification
- Kingdom: Plantae
- Clade: Tracheophytes
- Clade: Angiosperms
- Clade: Eudicots
- Clade: Rosids
- Order: Rosales
- Family: Rosaceae
- Genus: Pyrus
- Species: P. ussuriensis

Binomial name
- Pyrus ussuriensis Maxim.

= Pyrus ussuriensis =

Ussurian pear

Species of pear tree

Pyrus ussuriensis, also known as the Ussurian pear, Harbin pear, and Manchurian pear, is a species of flowering plant in the family Rosaceae.

It is native to Korea, Japan, China, and the Ussuri River area of far eastern Russia. It has flowers in spring that are slightly pink when budding and then turn white. Buds are dark brown and have an alternating arrangement. The tree grows to a height of about 15 meters (49 ft) and prefers well-drained loam-type soils. It is considered the hardiest of all pears. When planted in milder climates, the trees have been known to be killed by freezes after they begin budding. Many species of birds and mammals feed upon the fruit of this species. Deer, mice, and rabbits are known to damage the trees. Leaves are dark green in spring and summer and turn dark red and gold in autumn. Products made from the fruits may prove more effective than commercial insecticides in killing ticks and mites. Crosses of this species with other pears produces pears that grow in climates too cold for most pears.

Cultivars include the 'Reli', 'Jinxiang', 'Hongbalixiang', 'Baibalixiang', 'Fuwuxiang', 'Qiuxiang', 'Fuanjianba', 'Longxiang', 'Guanhongxiao', 'Shanli24', 'Wuxiangli', 'Shatangli', 'Manyuanxiang', 'McDermand', and the Prairie Gem Flowering Pear (cultivar ‘MorDak’). There are at least 108 compounds in the fruits that affect plant breeding and these show that P. ussuriensis cultivars fall into 4 groups.

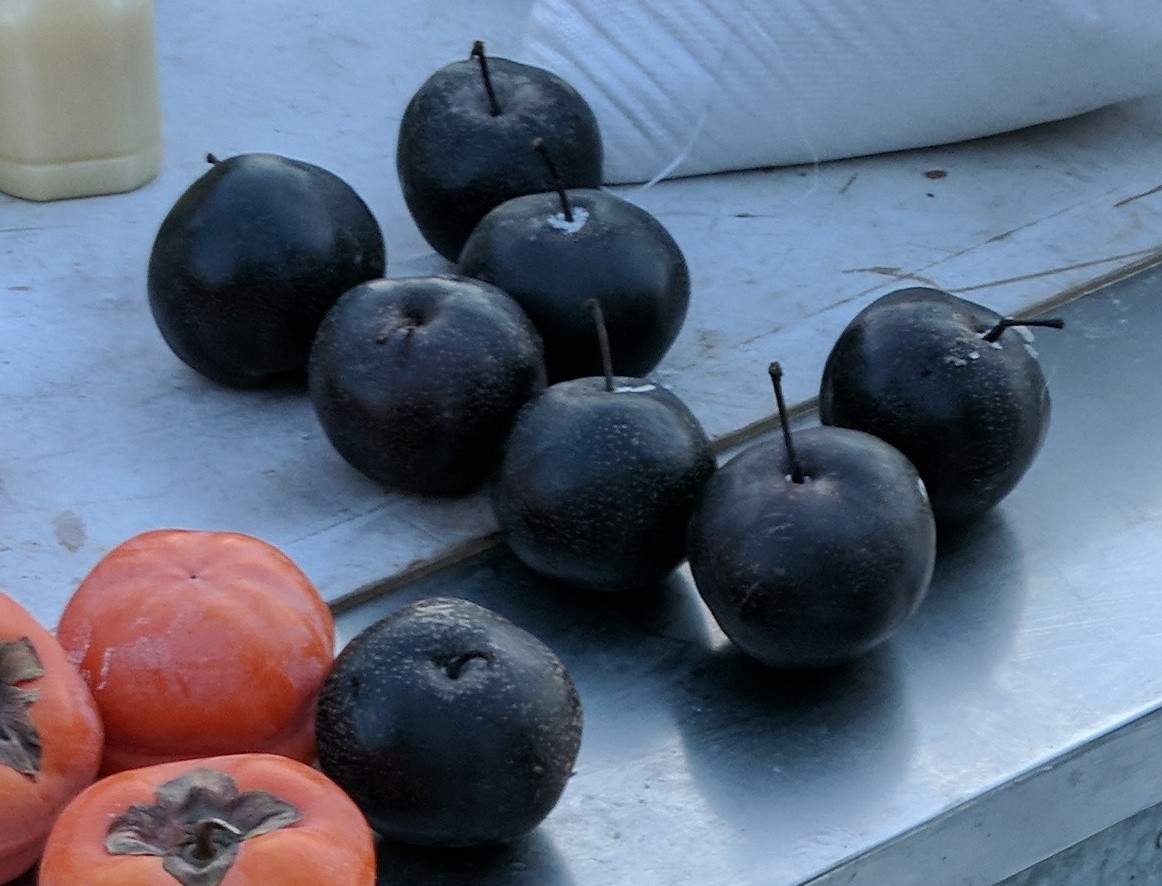
Frozen dongli (center) and persimmons (bottom left). Photograph taken in Jilin City during mid January.

In China, Ussurian pear is often freeze-thaw ripened in order to obtain a desired flavor and texture. This traditional product, called dongli, likely dates back to at least the Liao dynasty, helping to extend the pears shelf life during winter.
