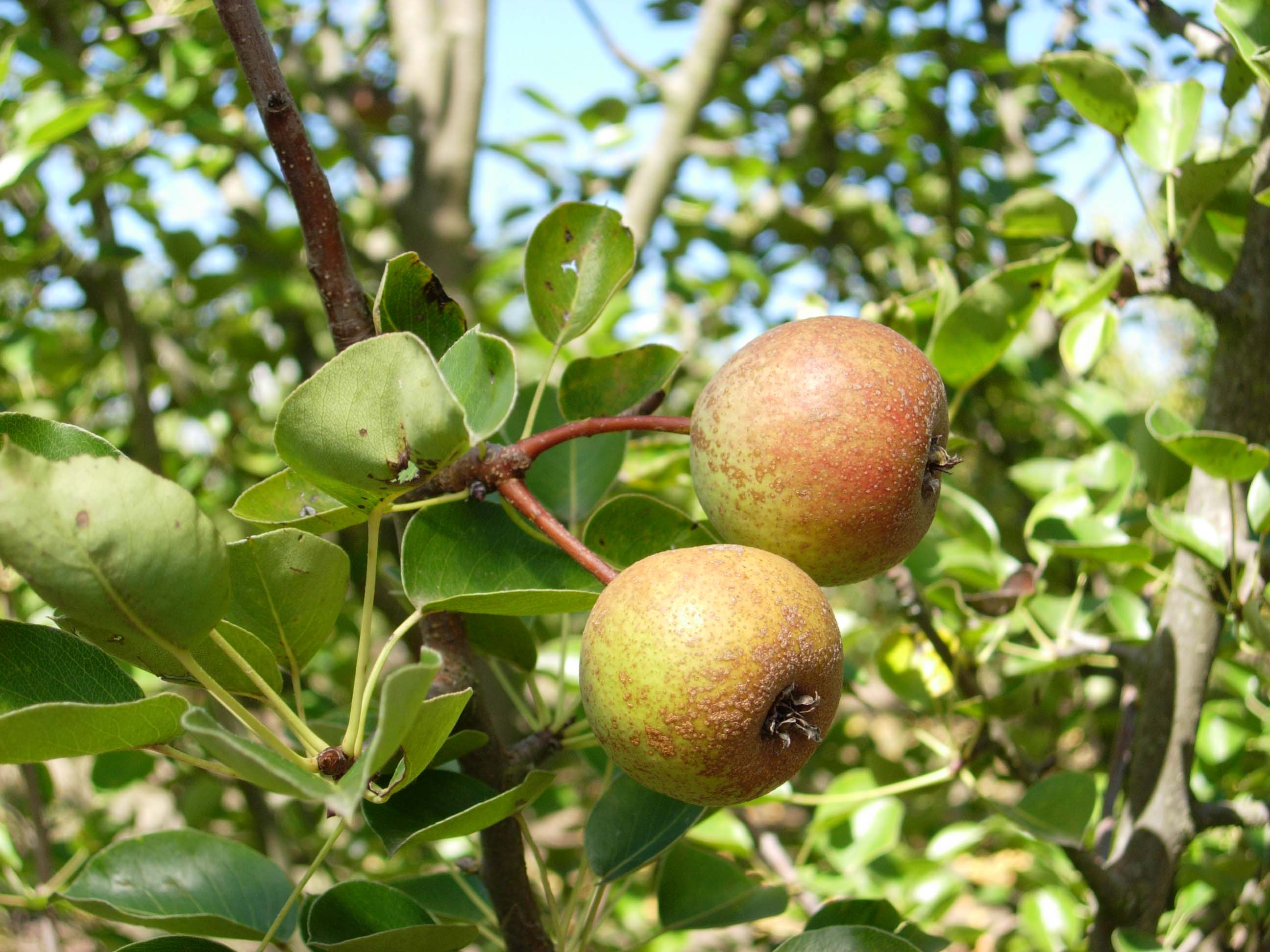
- Wild Himalayan pear tree with fruits

Conservation status
- Least Concern (IUCN 3.1)

Scientific classification
- Kingdom: Plantae
- Clade: Tracheophytes
- Clade: Angiosperms
- Clade: Eudicots
- Clade: Rosids
- Order: Rosales
- Family: Rosaceae
- Genus: Pyrus
- Section: Pyrus sect. Pashia
- Species: P. pashia

Binomial name
- Pyrus pashia Linnaeus, 1758

= Pyrus pashia =

Species of pear tree

Pyrus pashia, the wild Himalayan pear, is a small to medium size deciduous tree of the small and oval shaped crown with ovate, finely toothed leaves, attractive white flowers with red anthers and small pear-like fruits. It is a fruit bearing tree that is native to southern Asia. Locally, it is known by many names such as batangi (Urdu), tangi (Kashmiri), mahal mol (Hindi) and passi (Nepal).

== Distribution ==
Pyrus pashia is distributed across the Himalayas, from Pakistan to Vietnam and from southern province of China to the northern region of India. It is also found in the Indian Union Territory of Kashmir, Iran and Afghanistan.

== Habitat and ecology ==
Pyrus pashia is a tolerant tree that grows on sandy loamy soil that is well drained. It is adapted to a precipitation zone that ranges from 750 to 1500mm/yr or more, and a temperature that ranges from -10 to 35 C.

== Morphology ==
Pyrus pashia commonly occurs in mid-hill regions from the Caucasus to the Himalaya, between 750 and 2,600 metres (2,460 and 8,530 ft) above sea-level. The trees themselves, unlike the fruit, are not much sold in the retail trade, and beyond those growing wild the species can be found almost exclusively in local home gardens. The average tree is 6 to 10 metres (20 to 33 ft) tall and 6 metres (20 ft) wide. Wooly or fuzzy leaves and young branchlets are a primary identification characteristic on young trees; both become smoother as the tree ages. The leaves of a mature tree are characterized as simple, long-pointed, toothed, hairless and shining with an ovate to ovate-lanceolate shape the length of which ranges from 5 to 10 centimetres (2.0 to 3.9 in). Mature trees can have spiny branches with bark that is rough and quite dark, almost black in some cases. This can provide a dramatic backdrop to the tree's mass of bright white blooms in the spring and intense yellow foliage in the autumn.

== Flowers ==
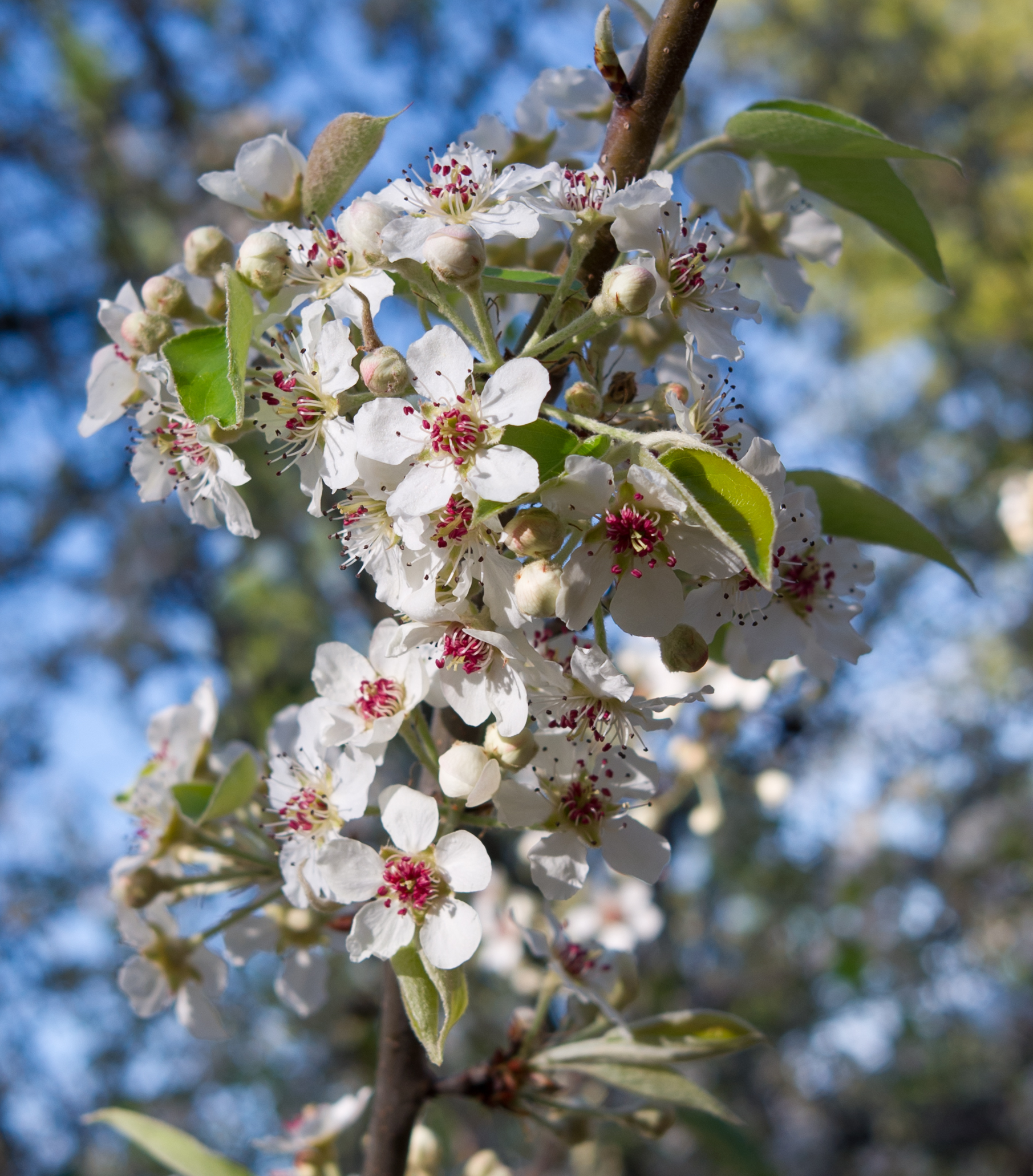
Flowers

Flowers of Pyrus pashia, 2 to 5 cm in diameter, are of white color that are slightly tinged with pink. They are pedicellate, ebracteate, actinomorphic, cyclic, hermaphrodite, and epigynous. Flowers borne on spurs and each spur usually bear 3 to 11 flowers. Each flower has 5 sepals and 5 petals along with 15 to 20 red colored stamens that are slightly shorter than petals. They have inferior ovary with 3 to 5 locules and each locule contains 2 ovules.

== Fruit ==
Pyrus pashia is a fruit bearing tree. Its fruit is edible and characterized as being pome. It looks like the russet apple and has an astringent but sweet taste when ripe.

The early fruit is mostly of light green color but at maturity, its color turns blackish brown with numerous yellow and white dots on its skin surface. The shape of fruit is often described as oblate, ovoid, obovoid, oval or quince. On average the fruit diameter ranges from 1 to 4 cm and the height ranges from 2 to 5 cm.

Fruit of Pyrus pashia is best to eat when it is slightly decaying. It is set apart from the cultivated pears by having a grittier texture. The fully ripe fruit has a reasonable flavor and, when bletted, is sweet and very pleasant to eat. It requires May to December time period to mature. A mature tree yields about 45 kg of fruit per year.

However, it is rarely found in local, national and international markets as it is not a major cultivated tree and also the fruit are very soft and highly perishable at maturity.

== Nutrition ==
The nutritive contents of fruit are about 6.8% sugars, 3.7% protein, 1% ash, 0.4% pectin. It also contains a low content of Vitamin C, about 1.2 mg per 100g.

The percentage contents of some of the mineral elements in the fruit are phosphorus, 0.026 percent, potassium, 0.475 percent, calcium, 0.061 percent, magnesium, 0.027 percent, and iron, 0.006 percent.

== Seed ==
Single fruit contain approximately five black colored seeds. They are often shaped like a pear and are small, and light weight. They are approximately 7 mm long, 2.5 mm wide, and weigh about 21 mg.

== Reproduction ==
Sexual reproduction and vegetative reproduction is the common means of reproduction in Pyrus pashia. Seed stored under refrigerated conditions will remain viable for 2 to 3 years.

== Growth rate ==
Growth of 30 cm in diameter of Pyrus pashia has been recorded over the period of 8 years.

== Flowering and fruiting season ==
The flowering season varies between late February and April. The fruits begin to ripen from the first week of November and continue to do so till the last week of December.

== Wood properties ==
The wood of Pyrus pashia is often hard, heavy and strong with light reddish-brown color. Its wood grain consists of a very fine, straight and even textured wood. Its density has a specific gravity of 0.70.

== Diseases and infections ==
The fruit and leaves are susceptible to a scab infection. Once scab gets in contact with plant it will rapidly spread through the root sprouts.

== Uses ==
=== Food ===
The fruits of Pyrus pashia are edible and are used by locals.

=== Medicinal ===
Locals use the juice of the ripened fruit to treat conjunctivitis by putting it in the eye of the diseased animal. They also use this juice, about 6 teaspoons twice a day, to treat diarrhea.

=== Other ===
Its wood is used for fuel as well as for making agricultural implements, walking sticks, combs, etc. Large limbs of this tree are used for fencing. Its root stocks are used for grafting purpose. Its decayed fruits, leaves and twigs are also lopped for fodder. In addition to this it has the potential to control erosion on steep hill sides.
