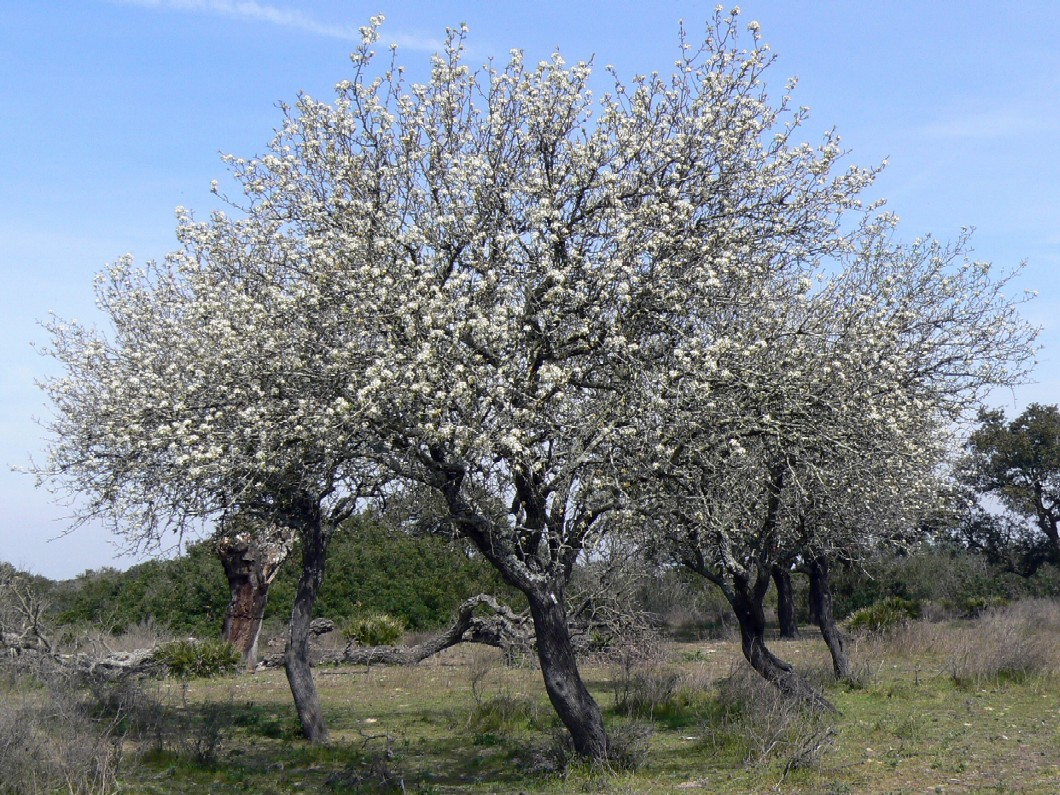
- Flowering Iberian pear group in the Doñana National Park (SW Spain)

Conservation status
- Least Concern (IUCN 3.1)

Scientific classification
- Kingdom: Plantae
- Clade: Tracheophytes
- Clade: Angiosperms
- Clade: Eudicots
- Clade: Rosids
- Order: Rosales
- Family: Rosaceae
- Genus: Pyrus
- Species: P. bourgaeana

Binomial name
- Pyrus bourgaeana Decne. (1871)

Synonyms
- List: Pyrus bourgaeana f. triloba (P.Silva & Fontes) P.Silva; Pyrus mamorensis Trab.

= Pyrus bourgaeana =

Species of pear tree

Pyrus bourgaeana, or the Iberian pear, is a species of pear in the rose family Rosaceae, and a close relative of the common pear (Pyrus communis). This small tree (typically 3–6 m high) is widely distributed across the southern Iberian Peninsula and northern Morocco, where it coexists with four other Pyrus species: common pear, Plymouth pear (P. cordata), almond-leaved pear (P. spinosa), and snow pear (P. nivalis). Characteristics to discriminate these species are the width of fruit peduncle, petal size, leaf width and petiole length.

== Description ==
Pyrus bourgaeana hermaphrodite flowers are white, rarely tinted pink, 2–3 cm diameter, and have five petals. Fruits are non-dehiscent globose pomes weighing ~ 9.5 g, with green or brown skin inconspicuous to birds, copious lenticels permitting scent to emanate, and pulp high in fiber. Each fruit usually contains 2-4 full seeds.

== Distribution ==
Within the Iberian Peninsula, P. bourgaeana distribution is very fragmented with trees occurring at low densities in small patches of Mediterranean scrubland that are isolated from each other by towns, cultivations, etc. Within these patches, mature trees often are aggregated in small clusters of 8-10 individuals Iberian pears are remarkably resistant to sicknesses or blight; they are more often killed by storms or high winds than by sickness.

== Phenology and interactions with animals ==
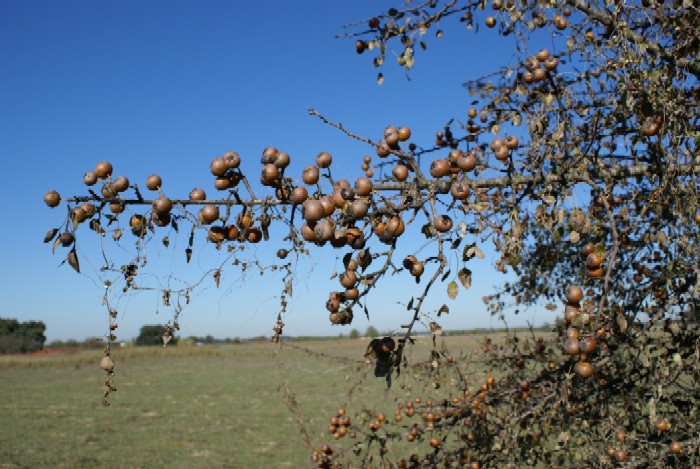
Fruiting branch of an isolated fruiting Iberian pear tree in SW Spain

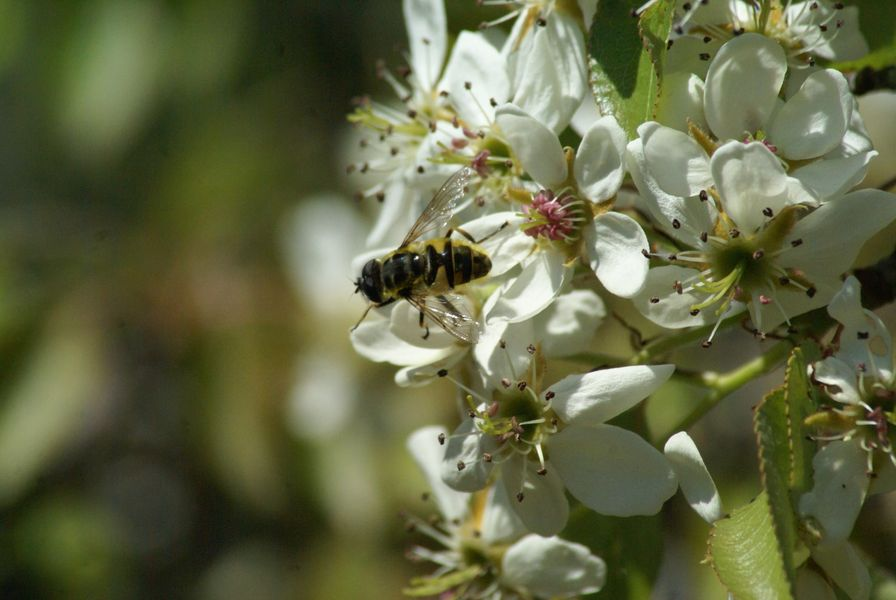
Flowers of Iberian pear visited by its pollinator Myathropa florea

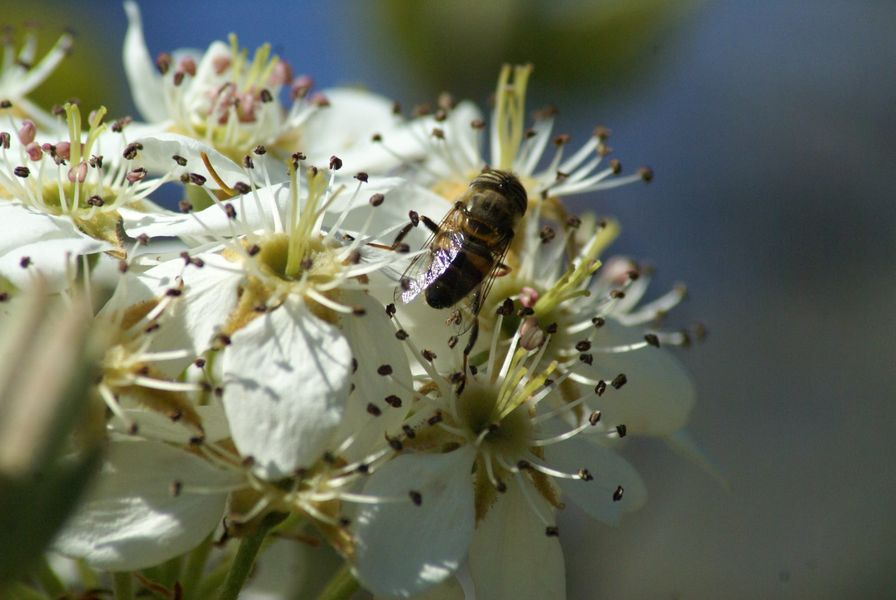
Flowers of Iberian pear visited by its pollinator Eristalinus taeniops

The Iberian pear flowers during February–March. It is pollinated by a wide variety of insects, such as bees, flies, and beetles. Each individual produces between 200–450 fruits that ripen from September to December, when they fall to the ground. Predispersal seed losses by invertebrates (microlepidoptera larvae) are usually low. Seeds of the Iberian pear are most frequently dispersed by mammals. Indeed, mammalian carnivores (European badgers Meles meles, red foxes Vulpes vulpes, etc.) often ingest whole fruits fallen to the ground and disperse ingested seeds away from conspecifics with the capacity of germination. In some areas, however, these dispersers have been decimated due to hunting and other human activities. European rabbits (Oryctolagus cunniculus) and some birds also feed on the fruit, eating only parts of the fruit pulp, but leaving the uneaten seeds under fruiting trees. Rodents often depredate the uncovered seeds in those partially eaten fruits. Ungulates (red deer Cervus elaphus, wild boar Sus scrofa) generally ingest whole fallen fruits, but they grind ingested seeds and thus act mostly as seed predators. Rodents can also act as post-dispersal predators of P. bourgaeana seeds. Seeds germinate epigeally either shortly after dispersal, or even within fallen fruits, and do not appear to persist in the soil seed bank. Seedlings emerge from winter to early spring, and extensive mortality occurs on young seedlings due to summer droughts and fungal infection.

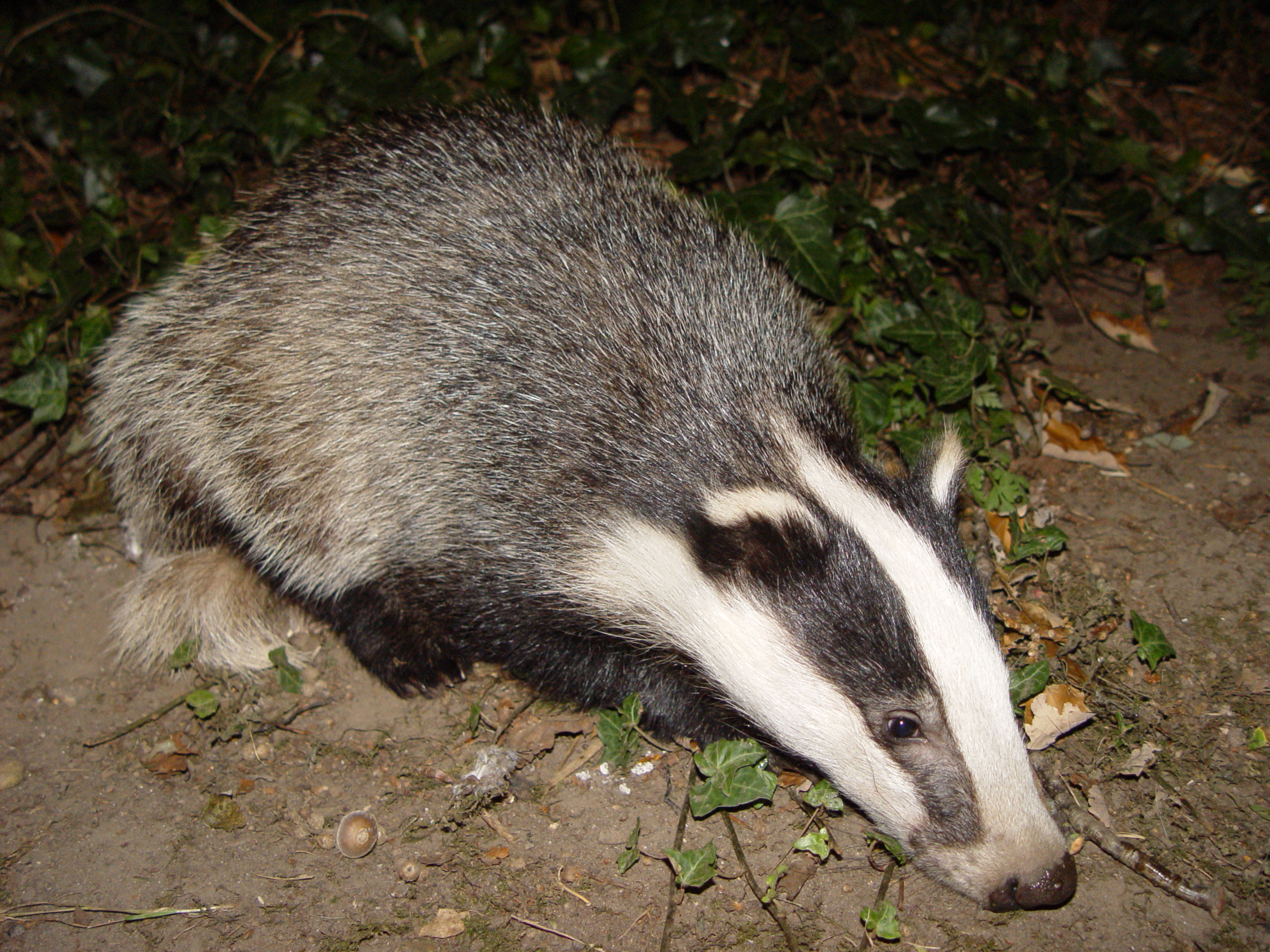
During the fall, the Eurasian badger Meles meles becomes strongly frugivorous and, in southern Spain, the main seed disperser of P. bourgaeana

The strong aggregated patterning is thought to be the result of several non-exclusive processes. First, by creating the initial template on which post-dispersal processes act, its seed dispersers like foxes and badgers can be partially responsible for P. bourgaena aggregation. Second, dispersal limitation sometimes leads to seedling establishment beneath mother trees, resulting in an aggregated patterning. This is a likely possibility since a fraction of the fruit fallen beneath adult trees are not taken by mammals or are partially depulped by rabbits, without dispersing the seeds. Some seedlings emerge beneath mother trees every season and, eventually, a few of them get established. Finally, rhizome sprouting in response to disturbance could result in clustering if different sprouts emerge from a single individual and eventually produce fruit. In Doñana National Park of Andalusia, P. bourgaeana experience heavy browsing by red deer Cervus elaphus and sprouts of a range of sizes emerge beneath some trees. As those shoots grow could eventually reach the adult size leading to tree clustering.

== Uses and threats ==
Pear wood (of any species) has one of the finest textures of the fruitwoods. It is prized for making woodwind instruments, and pear veneer is used in fine furniture. In southern Spain, the Iberian pear has been used as rootstock for grafting pear cultivars. The fruit is not edible for people.

The major threats are urbanization and agricultural development.
