= Rhagades predotae =

Scientific classification
- Domain: Eukaryota
- Kingdom: Animalia
- Phylum: Arthropoda
- Class: Insecta
- Order: Lepidoptera
- Family: Zygaenidae
- Genus: Rhagades
- Species: R. predotae

Binomial name
- Rhagades predotae (Naufock, 1931)

Synonyms
- Procris predotae Naufock, 1931

Species of moth

Rhagades predotae is a moth of the family Zygaenidae. It is known from central, southern and eastern Spain.

The length of the forewings is 9–10 mm for both males and females. Adults are on wing during the day.

The larvae feed on Prunus spinosa and Pyrus bourgaeana.
