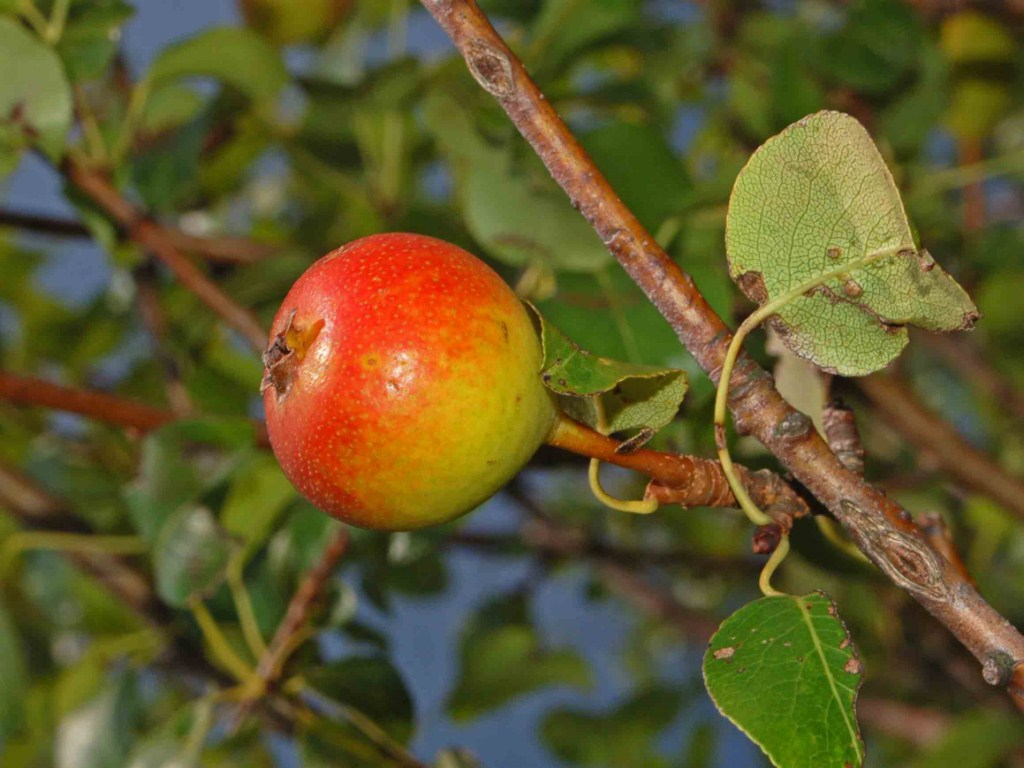
- Fruit of Pyrus pyraster

Scientific classification
- Kingdom: Plantae
- Clade: Tracheophytes
- Clade: Angiosperms
- Clade: Eudicots
- Clade: Rosids
- Order: Rosales
- Family: Rosaceae
- Genus: Pyrus
- Species: P. pyraster

Binomial name
- Pyrus pyraster (L.) Burgsd.

Synonyms
- Pyrus communis var. achras (Gaertn.) Wallr.; Pyrus communis subsp. pyraster (L.) Ehrh.

= Pyrus pyraster =

Species of tree

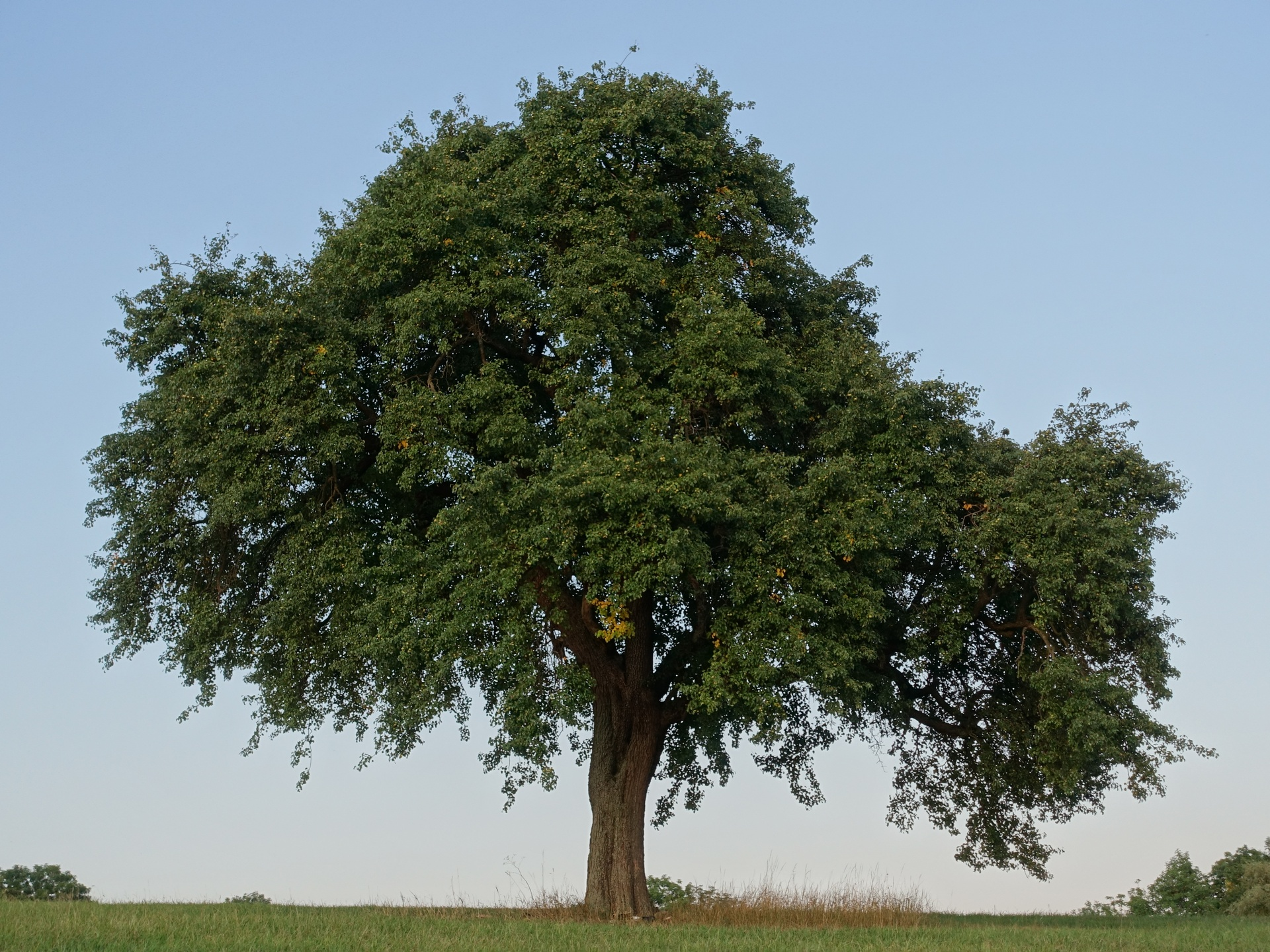
Pyrus pyraster tree (natural monument in Bayreuth)

Pyrus pyraster (syn. Pyrus communis subsp. pyraster), also called European wild pear, is a species of pear of the family Rosaceae.

This wild pear and Pyrus caucasica (syn. P. communis subsp. caucasica) are thought to be the ancestors of the cultivated European pear (Pyrus communis subsp. communis). Both the wild pears are interfertile with domesticated pears.

It is sometimes difficult to distinguish Pyrus pyraster from a common pear. Pyrus pyraster can reach an age of 100 to 150 years.

== Description ==
Pyrus pyraster is a deciduous plant reaching 3–4 metres (9.8–13.1 ft) in height as medium-sized shrub and 15–20 metres (49–66 ft) as a tree. Unlike the cultivated form, the branches have thorns. The leaves are ovate with serrated margins. The flowers have white petals. The stamens are equal to the length of styles. The flowering period extends from April through May. The fruits reach 1–4 centimetres (0.39–1.57 in) in diameter and ripen in late summer to early autumn. They are quite hard and astringent, but they have a sweet taste and are edible when they are very ripe and fall from the tree. The seeds ripen in September.

Fruits look like a Pyrus ussuriensis var. acidula.

Under good growing conditions, wild pear trees have a remarkably slender form with a characteristic rising crown. In less favourable conditions they show other characteristic growth forms, such as one-sided or extremely low crowns.

== Distribution ==
The distribution of wild pear ranges from Western Europe to the Caucasus. It does not appear in Northern Europe. The wild pear has become quite rare. It is sympatric with Pyrus elaeagrifolia. It may hybridize with other pears, producing, for example, Pyrus austriaca in a cross with Pyrus nivalis.

== Habitat ==
Wild pear can grow on almost all soils, except the most acidic ones. However, owing to its weak competitive ability, the species exists mostly on extreme or marginal sites. Its tap roots enable it to grow on very dry soils. The tree requires a lot of light and is often found in the open landscape. It occurs in thickets and open woods with cool-temperate climates, in lowlands, hills and sometimes in the mountains, at 0–1,400 metres (0–4,593 ft) above sea level.

== Wild pears in Britain ==
The "wild pears" of England and Wales are actually thought to be domesticates that escaped cultivation. They appear to be archaeophytes, with charcoal and carbonised pips having been found at several Neolithic sites and are occasionally mentioned in medieval documents. It is likely that pears spread to Britain after their domestication with early farmers and subsequently escaped into the wild. Its establishment in the British Isles is probably due to human migration, with the trees belonging to one of the Pyrus communis subspecies instead of the true wild pear species of P. pyraster, which is native to much of continental Europe but absent from Britain.

Another species of pear found wild in South West England, the Plymouth pear (Pyrus cordata), is now thought to have originated from hedging plants imported from Brittany.

== Gallery ==
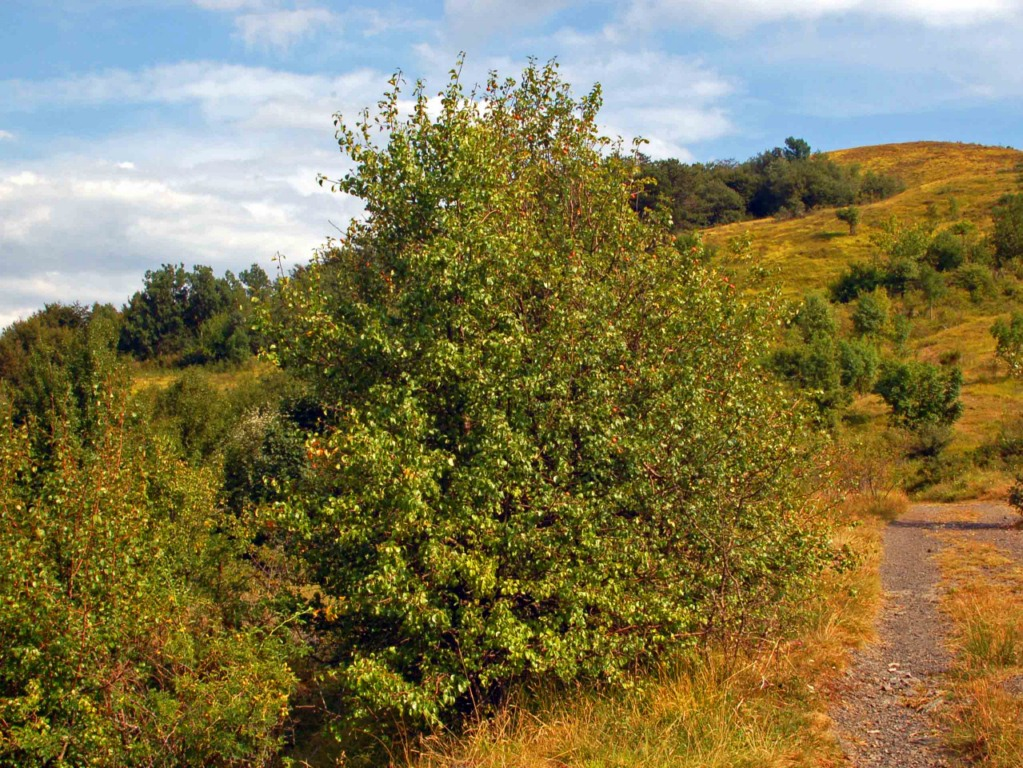
Shrub of Pyrus pyraster

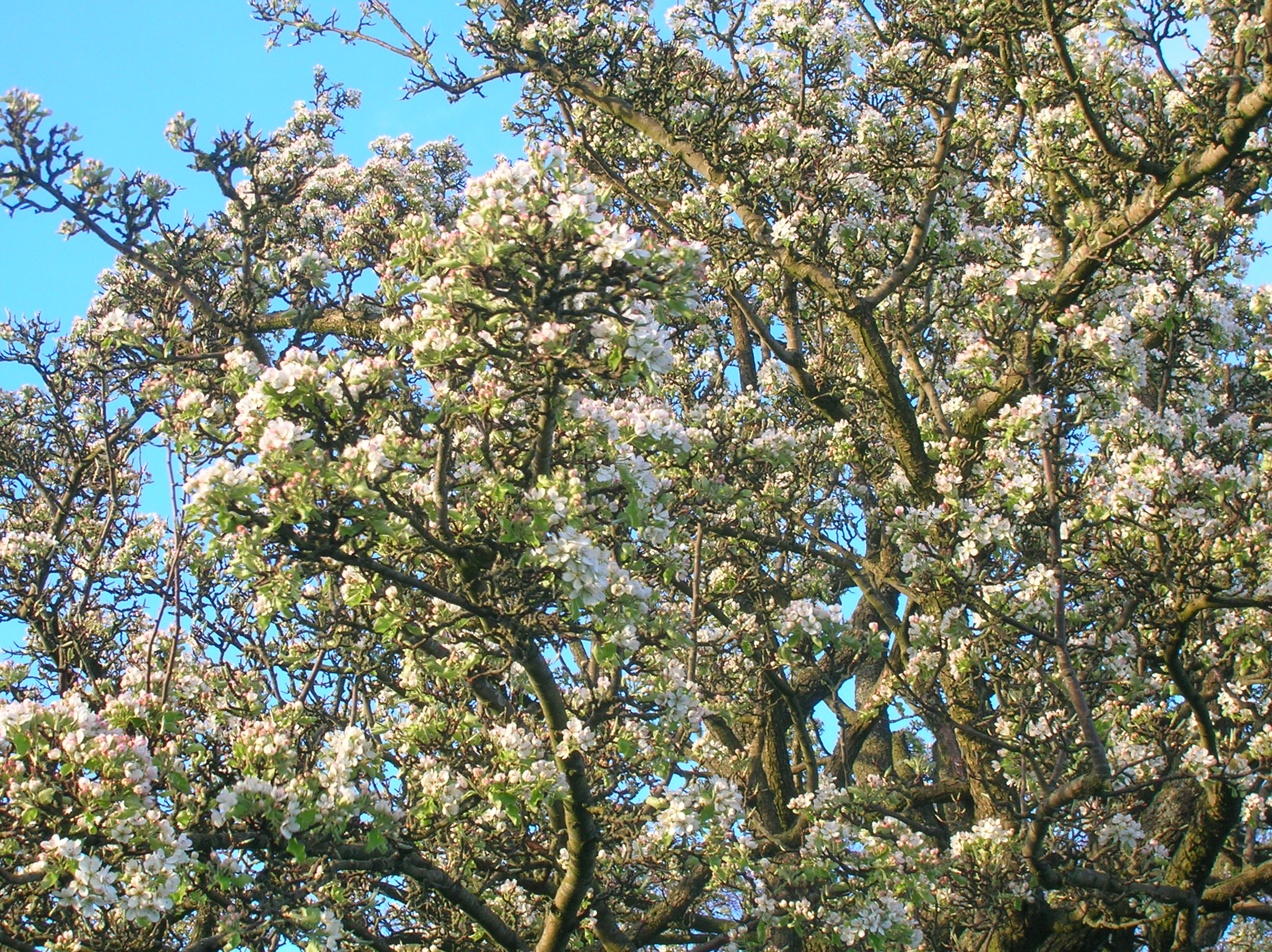
Pyrus pyraster in full blossom

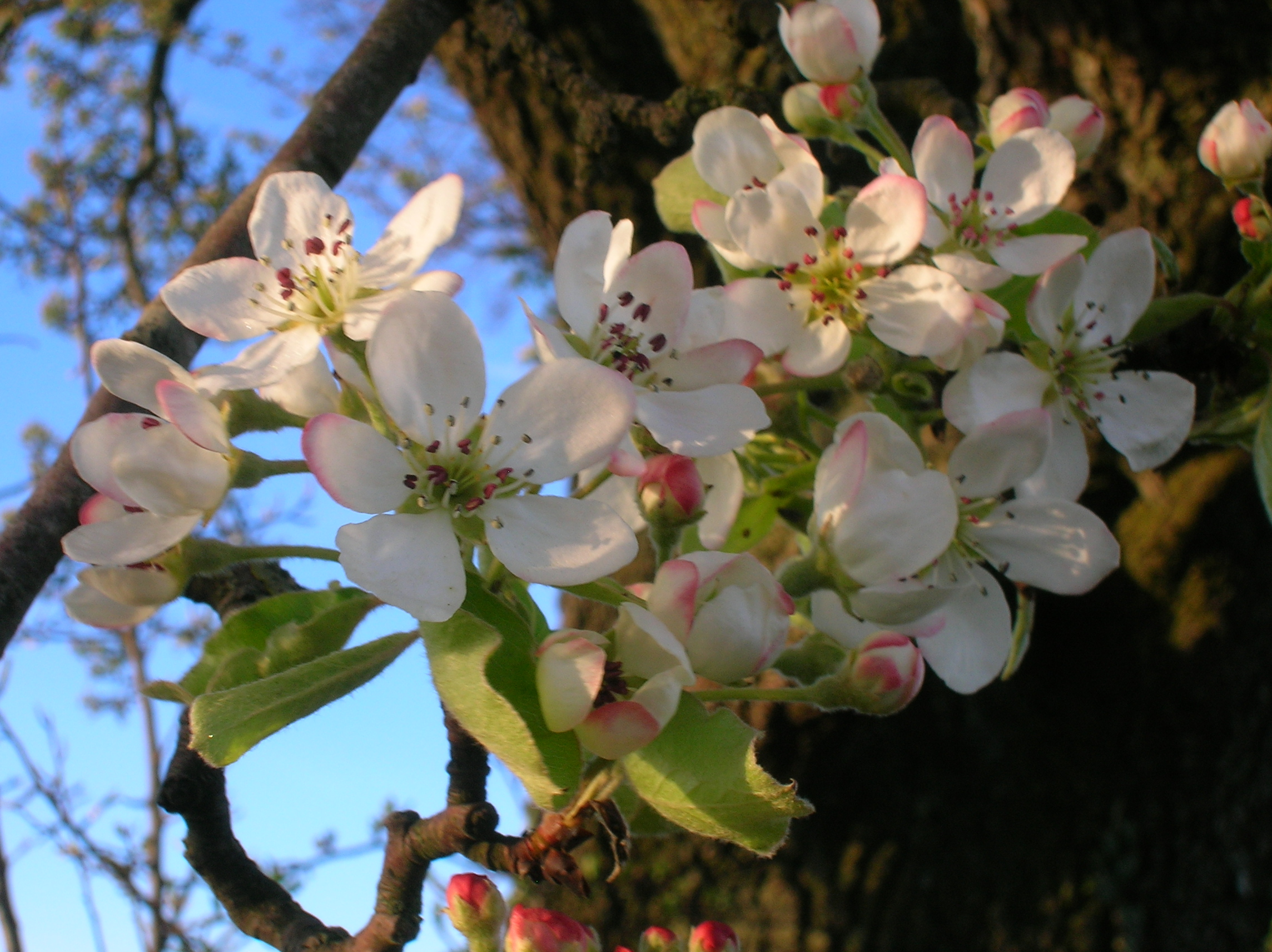
Close-up on flowers of Pyrus pyraster

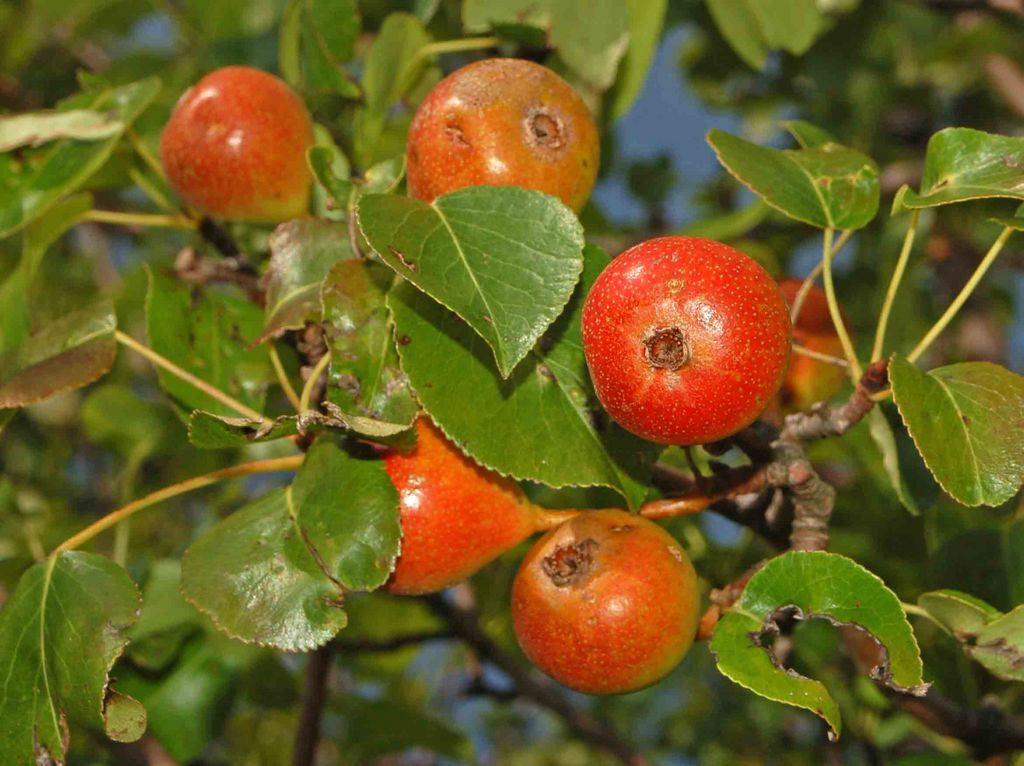
Fruits Pyrus pyraster

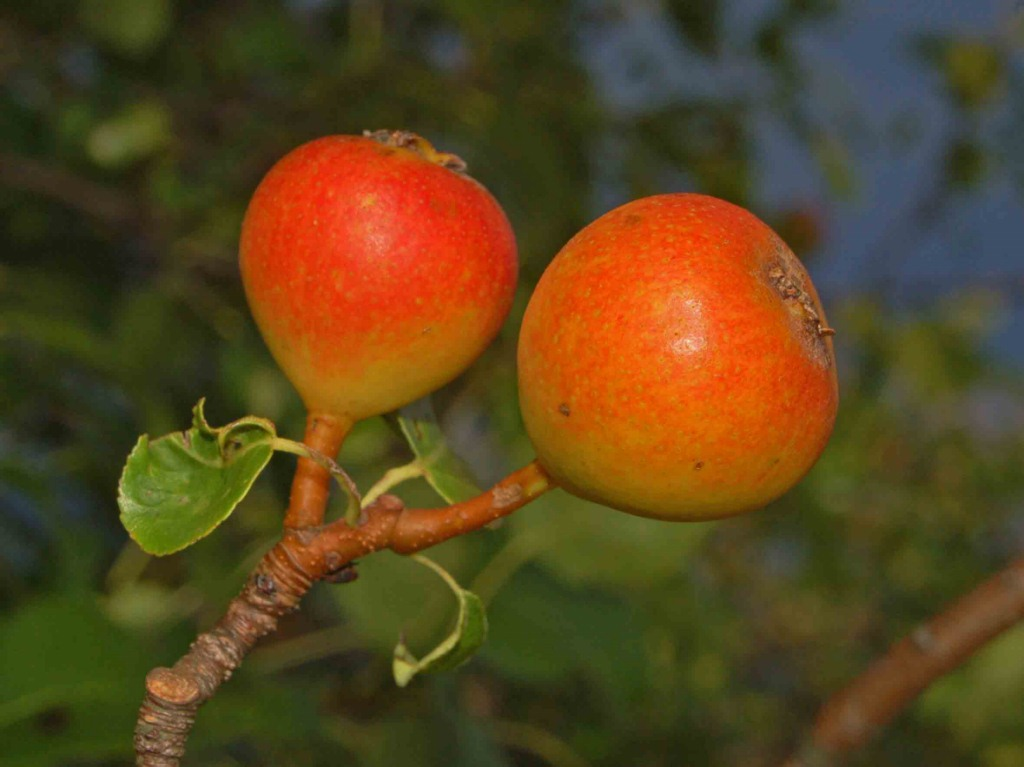
Fruits of Pyrus pyraster

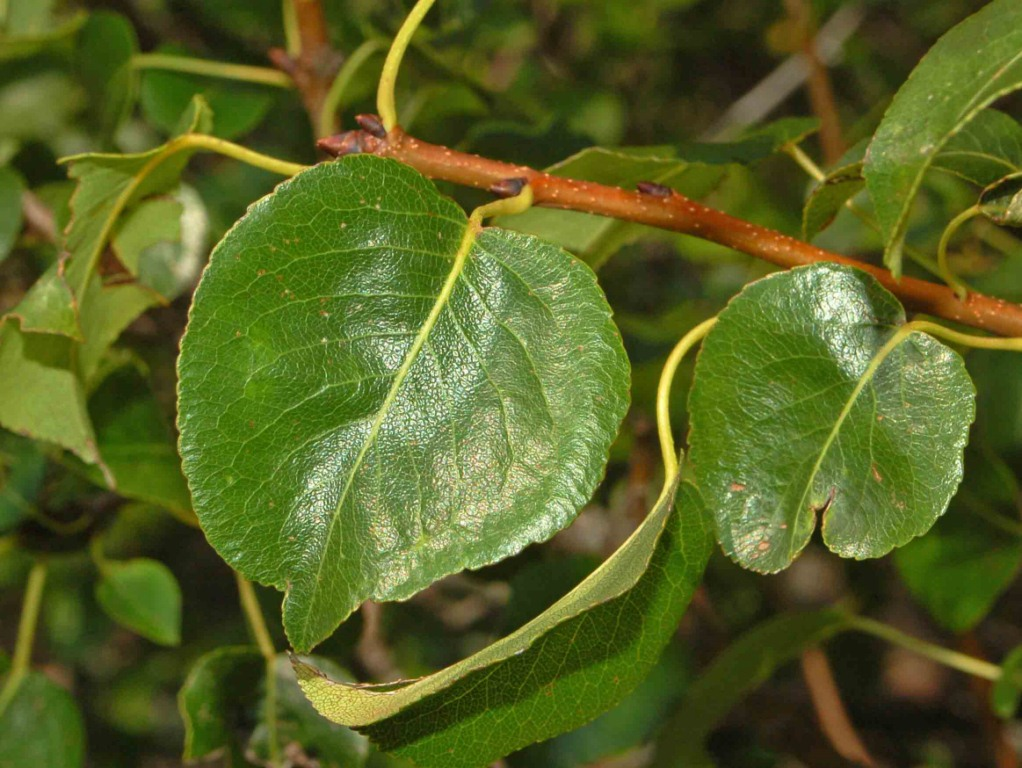
Leaves of Pyrus pyraster

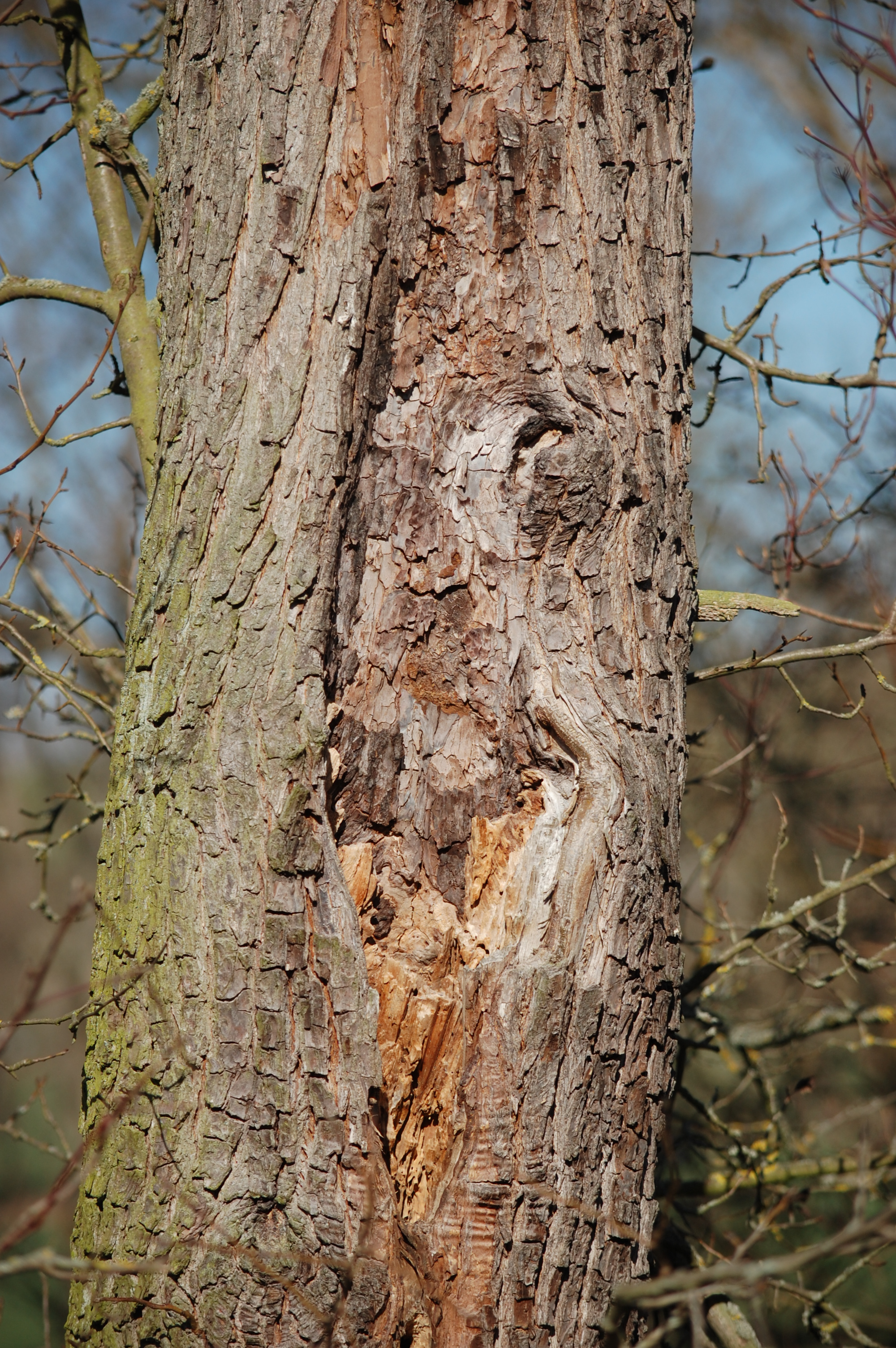
Bark of Pyrus pyraster
