= Rhagades amasina =

Scientific classification
- Domain: Eukaryota
- Kingdom: Animalia
- Phylum: Arthropoda
- Class: Insecta
- Order: Lepidoptera
- Family: Zygaenidae
- Genus: Rhagades
- Species: R. amasina

Binomial name
- Rhagades amasina (Herrich-Schäffer, 1851)

Synonyms
- Procris amasina Herrich-Schaffer, 1851

Species of moth

Rhagades amasina is a moth of the family Zygaenidae. It is known from Bulgaria (Sakar), Greece (Kos and Rhodes), Turkey, northern Syria and Lebanon.

The length of the forewings is 9–10.5 mm for males and 8.5–9.5 mm for females.

The larvae feed on Prunus and Crataegus species. They skeletonise the leaves of their host plant. Pupation takes in place in a white cocoon.
