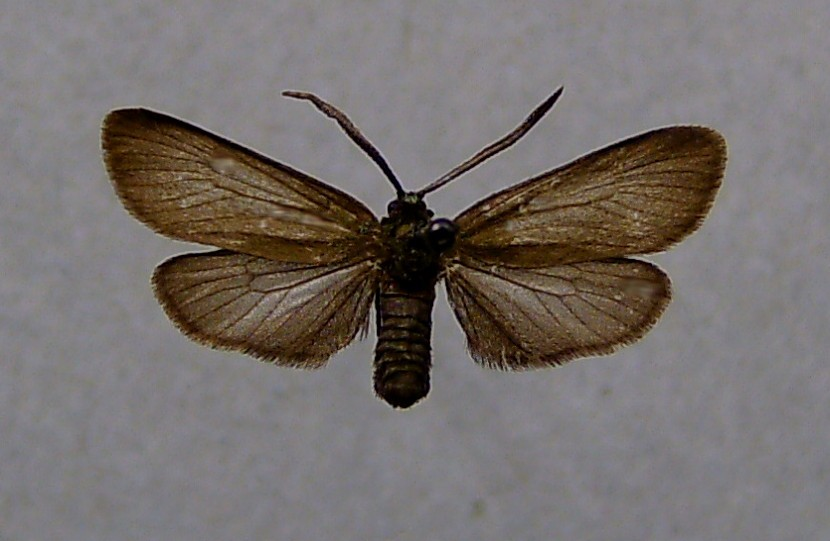

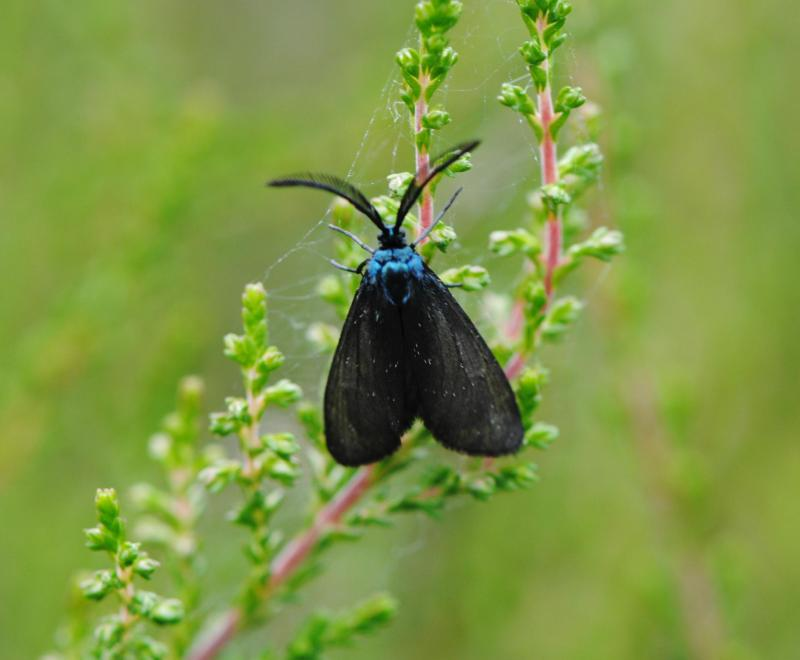

Scientific classification
- Kingdom: Animalia
- Phylum: Arthropoda
- Clade: Pancrustacea
- Class: Insecta
- Order: Lepidoptera
- Family: Zygaenidae
- Genus: Rhagades
- Species: R. pruni

Binomial name
- Rhagades pruni (Denis & Schiffermüller, 1775)

Synonyms
- Sphinx pruni Denis & Schiffermuller, 1775

= Rhagades pruni =

Species of moth

Rhagades pruni is a species of moth of the family Zygaenidae. It is found in most of Europe (except for the British Isles) up to East Asia, including Japan.

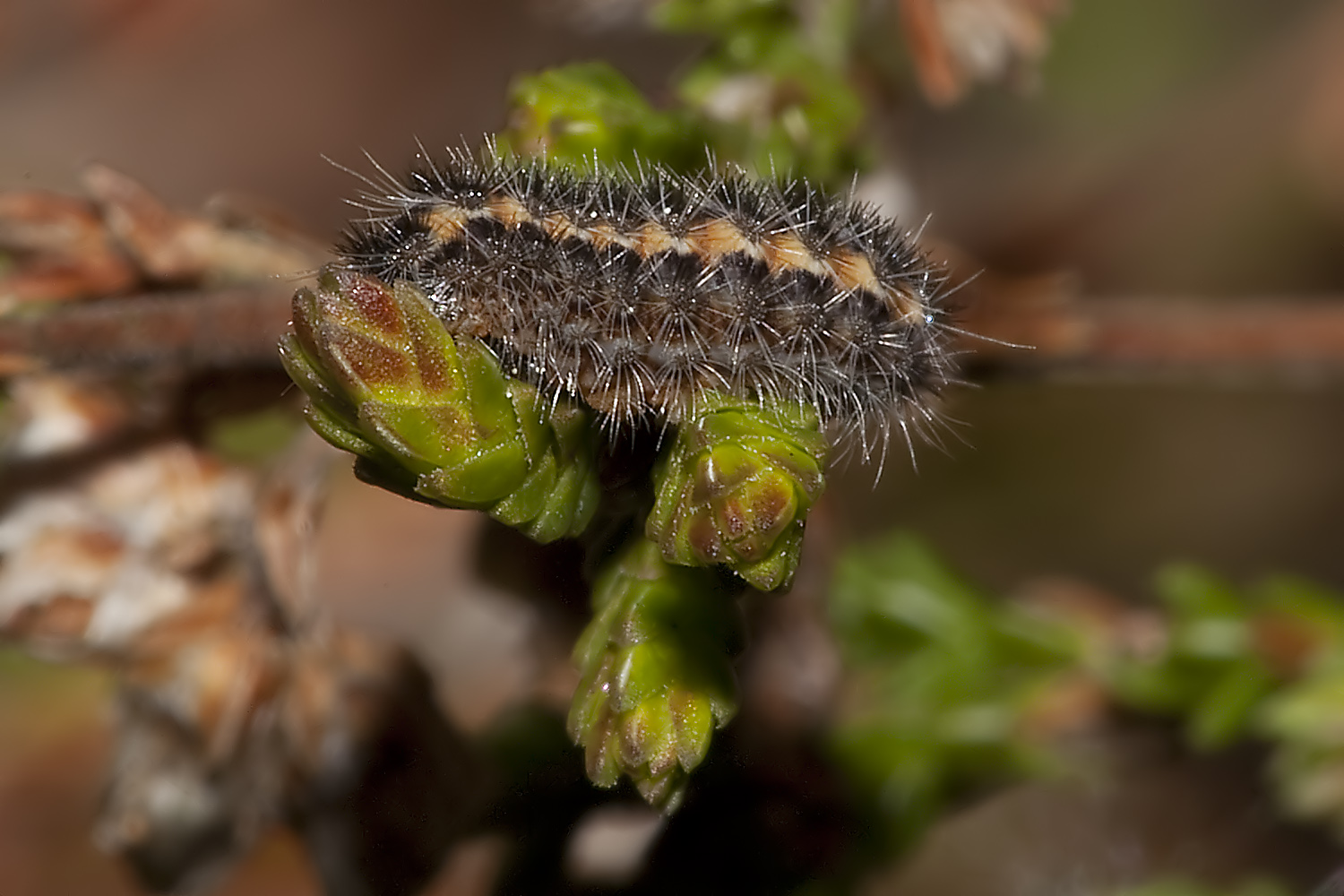
Larva

The length of the forewings is 10–12 mm for males and 8–11 mm for females. The larvae feed on Vaccinium uliginosum, Calluna vulgaris and Andromeda polifolia. (after Denis & Schiffermüller, 1775)

== Subspecies ==
- Rhagades pruni pruni (Denis & Schiffermüller, 1775)
- Rhagades pruni callunae Spuler, 1906

== Bibliography ==
- Šašić, Martina; Nahirnić, Ana; Tarmann, Gerhard M. (2016-12-31). "Zygaenidae (Lepidoptera) in the Lepidoptera collections of the Croatian Natural History Museum". Natura Croatica: Periodicum Musei Historiae Naturalis Croatici. 25 (2): 233–248. doi:10.20302/NC.2016.25.19. eISSN 1848-7386.
