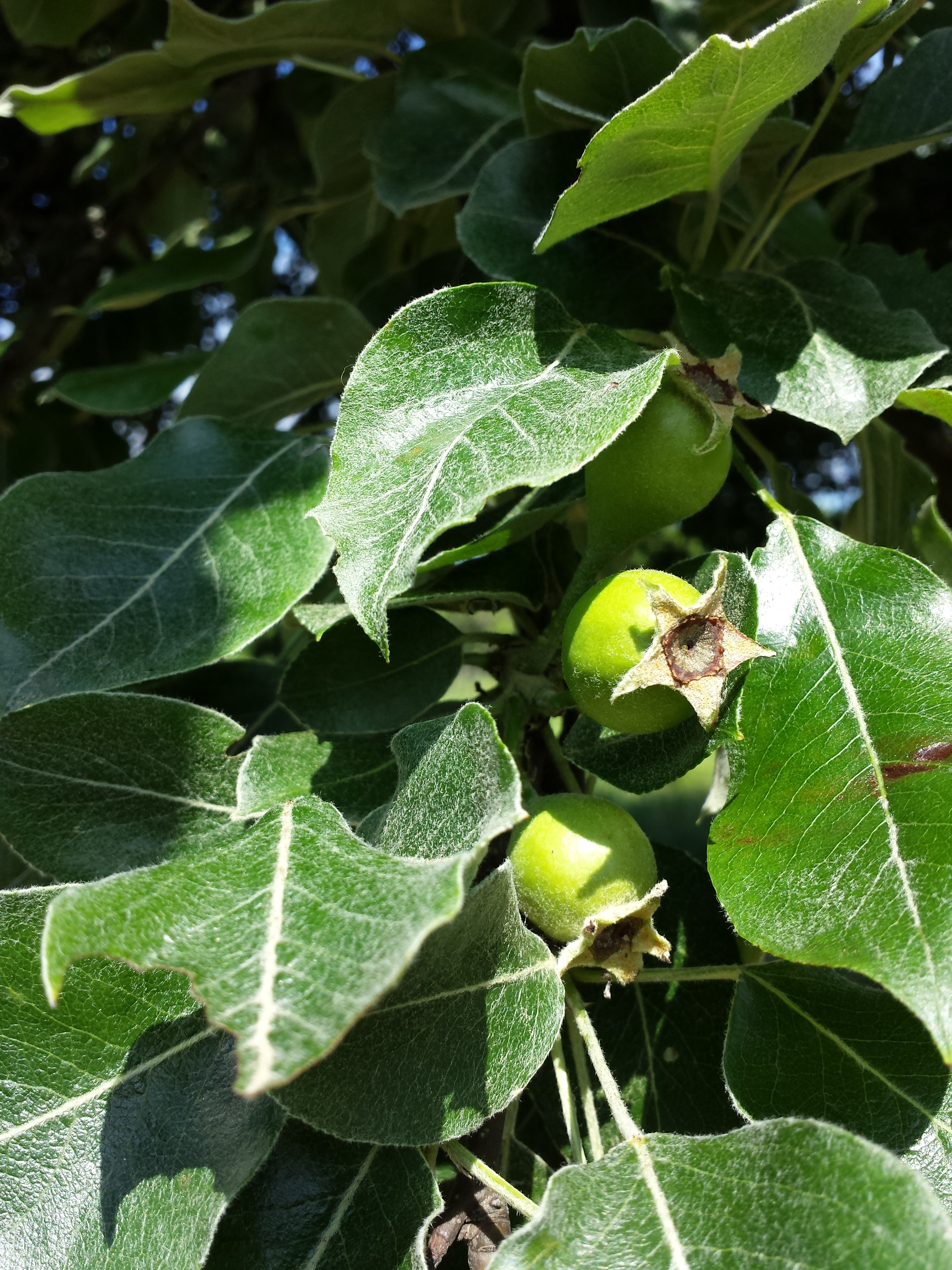

Scientific classification
- Kingdom: Plantae
- Clade: Embryophytes
- Clade: Tracheophytes
- Clade: Spermatophytes
- Clade: Angiosperms
- Clade: Eudicots
- Clade: Rosids
- Order: Rosales
- Family: Rosaceae
- Genus: Pyrus
- Species: P. austriaca

Binomial name
- Pyrus austriaca A.Kern.

= Pyrus austriaca =

Species of flowering plant

Pyrus austriaca, the Austrian pear, is a species of flowering plant in the genus Pyrus found in central and southern Europe, and Turkey. They are very large trees for pears, reaching 20 m (66 ft). It is thought to be a hybrid species of Pyrus pyraster (European wild pear) and Pyrus nivalis (snow pear or yellow pear).
