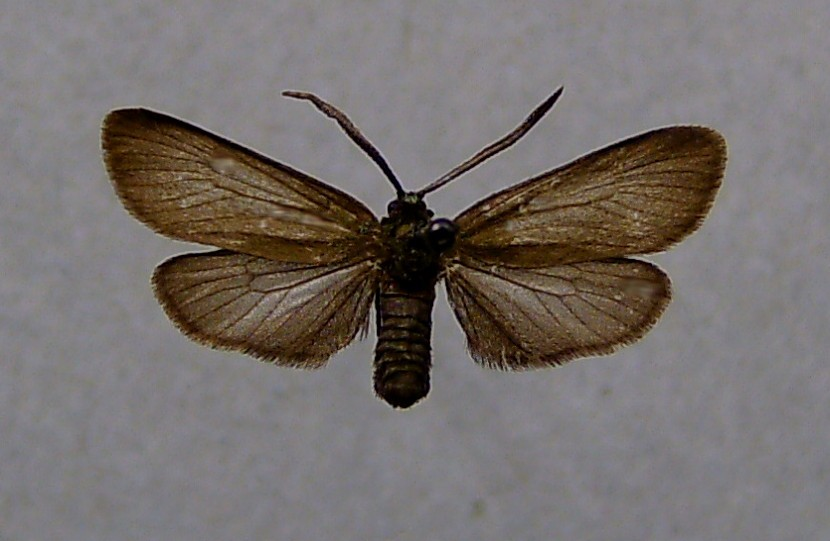
- Rhagades pruni

Scientific classification
- Domain: Eukaryota
- Kingdom: Animalia
- Phylum: Arthropoda
- Class: Insecta
- Order: Lepidoptera
- Family: Zygaenidae
- Subfamily: Procridinae
- Genus: Rhagades; Wallengren, 1863

Synonyms
- Naufockia Alberti, 1954; Wiegelia Efetov & Tarmann, 1995

= Rhagades (moth) =

Genus of moths

Rhagades is a genus of moths of the family Zygaenidae. The genus was erected by Hans Daniel Johan Wallengren in 1863.

== Species ==
- Subgenus Rhagades
  - Rhagades pruni (Denis & Schiffermüller, 1775)
- Subgenus Wiegelia Efetov & Tarmann, 1995
  - Rhagades amasina (Herrich-Schäffer, 1851)
  - Rhagades predotae (Naufock, 1931)
