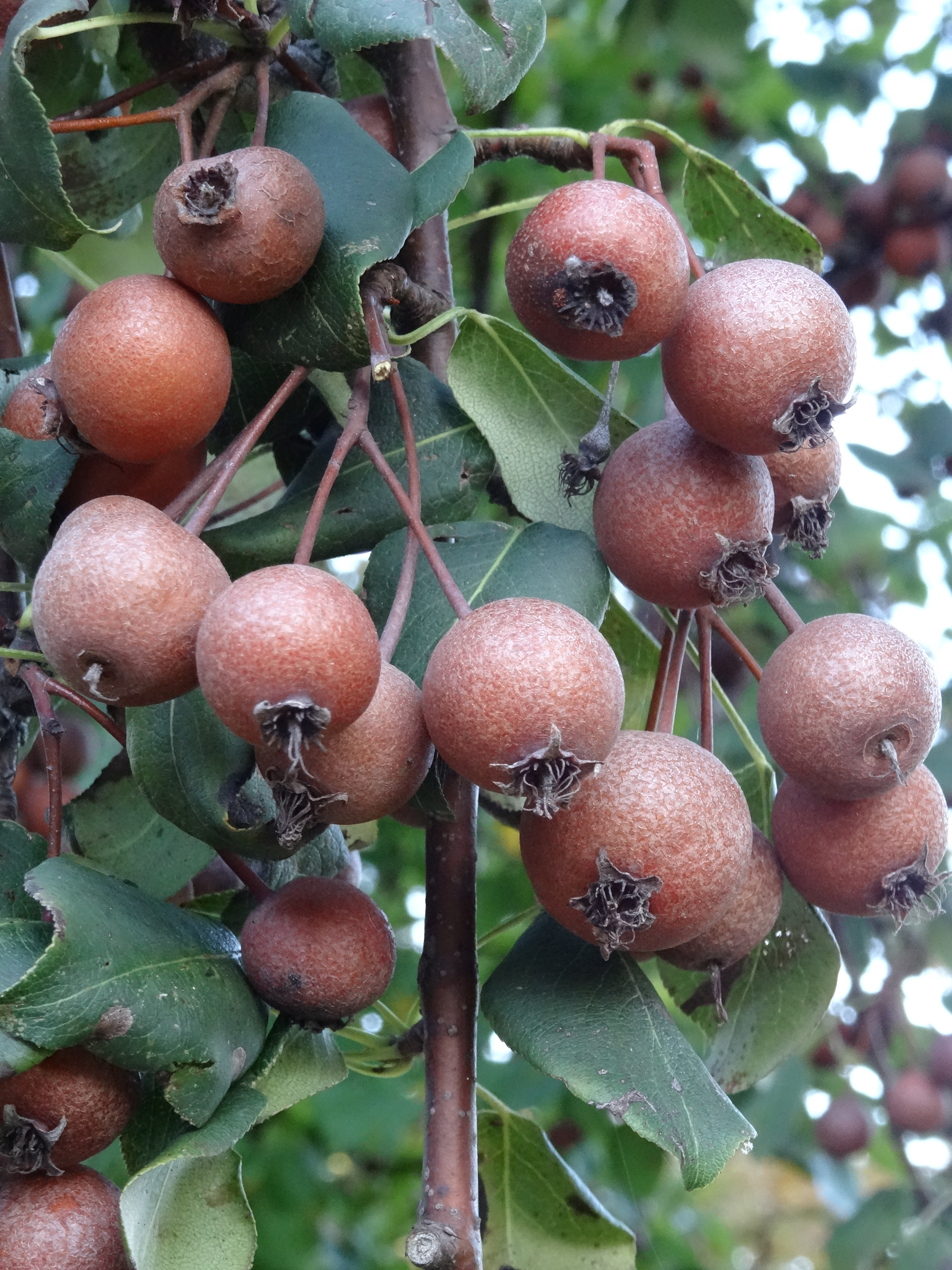

Conservation status
- Least Concern (IUCN 3.1)

Scientific classification
- Kingdom: Plantae
- Clade: Tracheophytes
- Clade: Angiosperms
- Clade: Eudicots
- Clade: Rosids
- Order: Rosales
- Family: Rosaceae
- Genus: Pyrus
- Species: P. cordata

Binomial name
- Pyrus cordata Desv.

Synonyms
- List: Malus longipes Wenz.; Pyrus cordata subsp. briggsii (Syme) Coombe & P.D.Sell; Pyrus cossonii Rehder; Pyrus gharbiana Trab.; Pyrus longipes Coss. & Durieu; Pyrus macropoda Rehder

= Pyrus cordata =

Species of pear tree

Pyrus cordata, the Plymouth pear (English name) or heart-leaved pear (European name), is a rare wild species of pear belonging to the family Rosaceae. It gets its scientific name cordata and French names Poirier à feuilles en cœur, Poirier à feuilles cordées from the shape of its leaves. The English name Plymouth pear is after the city of Plymouth in Devon, where it was originally found in 1870 The Plymouth pear was one of the British trees to be funded under English Natures Species Recovery Programme.

It is a small tree, that grows in hedgerows or at the edge of woods. The Plymouth pear is considered to be either a subspecies of Pyrus pyraster (European wild pear) or a distinct species. It is one of the rarest trees in the UK and it is protected under Schedule 8 of the Wildlife and Countryside Act and seeds have been deposited at Kew's Millennium Seed Bank.

== Description ==
Pyrus cordata is a deciduous shrub or small tree growing up to 10 metres (33 ft) in height. It is hardy and is not frost tender, but its ability to bear fruit and thus seed is dependent upon favourable weather conditions. It is in flower from April to May. The flowers are hermaphroditic and are pollinated by insects. The trees have pale cream blossom with some pink. The smell of the blossom has however been described as a faint but disgusting smell compared to rotting scampi, soiled sheets or wet carpets. The odour attracts mainly flies including some more often drawn to decaying plant matter such as Bibio marci. It is common in Brittany, Northern Portugal and Galicia where it occurs at woodland margins and scrub on acid soils.

== Distribution ==
The Plymouth pear has an Atlantic distribution and is found in Western Europe in France (notably in Brittany), Spain (notably in Galicia), Portugal and with a small presence in the United Kingdom (in Devon and Cornwall) where it is now believed to be an archaeophyte.

== Habitat ==
It occurs in thickets, hedgerows, scrub and open woods with cool-temperate climates, in lowlands and hills. Not much about its requirements in the UK are known, but conservationists are looking at how it behaves in Brittany to get an idea about its requirements.

=== English population ===
The species receives its English name from the area it was originally found growing in Plymouth in 1871 by a local naturalist, T. R. Archer Briggs. In the United Kingdom the species is very rare and is confined to two areas – Plymouth and Truro. The genetic diversity of the species in the UK is very low with the two widely scattered populations being genetically identical which suggests that one of the populations was established from clonal material taken from the other (suckers or cuttings).

However this lack of genetic diversity is a threat to the population because most of the seeds are infertile, but efforts are being made to conserve the population by controlled breeding of trees in botanical gardens and by attempting to induce genetic mutations and variation in cultivated specimens. Genetic material from other parts of Europe is being avoided, so no trees are being introduced from the mainland European population. The conservation of the species involves attempting to increase the genetic diversity and so it is hoped that some mutations will take place with the cultivated stock which it is hoped will allow them to breed more successfully (Pears are self-sterile, so clones cannot breed easily with other clones).

The species suffers from low seed fertility caused by the inbreeding of the two, British populations and conservation efforts are attempting to combat this. The two populations are also threatened by the use of the landscape but they are being preserved in protected areas in their range.

Botanists at Kew Gardens where conservation efforts are taking place have concluded that the Plymouth pear was brought from Brittany as a hedging plant several hundred years ago.

== Places found ==
- Estover Industrial Estate, in Plymouth.
- Cannon Mill industrial estate, Estover Road, Plymouth.
- Yardley Gardens at Estover
- Derriford Hospital Opposite the entrance and in the Hospital carpark.
- Truro: Found in the hedges of the country lanes immediately south of the city.
- Forder Valley Nature Reserve.
- Efford Marsh Nature Reserve.
- Plymbridge Lane, Plymouth.
- Devonport Park, Plymouth.

== Specimen trees ==
- Royal Botanic Gardens, Kew. Three trees outside Queen's Cottage
- Wakehurst Place, Kew's country garden.
- Charles Church, roundabout at Plymouth.
- Carclew House, near Truro
- Lanhydrock estate - The National Trust planted several specimens for a recovery programme in 1996.
- Tregothnan House gardens, Cornwall
