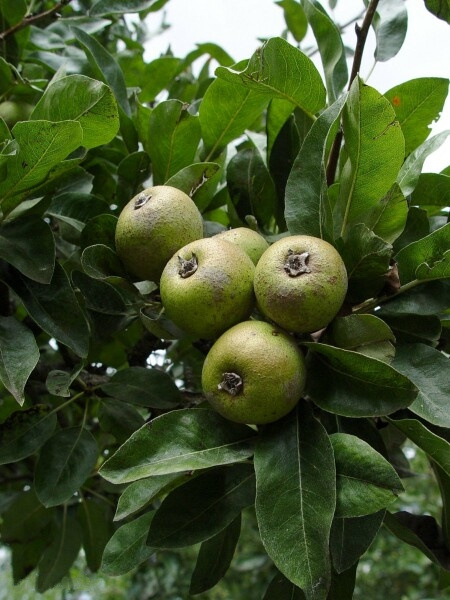

Conservation status
- Data Deficient (IUCN 3.1)

Scientific classification
- Kingdom: Plantae
- Clade: Tracheophytes
- Clade: Angiosperms
- Clade: Eudicots
- Clade: Rosids
- Order: Rosales
- Family: Rosaceae
- Genus: Pyrus
- Species: P. nivalis

Binomial name
- Pyrus nivalis Jacq.

= Pyrus nivalis =

Species of pear tree

Pyrus nivalis, commonly known as yellow pear or snow pear, is a species of tree in the family Rosaceae that grows naturally from South-East Europe to Western Asia. Like most pears, its fruit can be eaten raw or cooked; it has a mild sour taste. The fruit is picked in October, when it is still dry and unripe; it will not become soft and sweet until the end of November or December, hence the name snow pear (German: Schneebirne).

The plant is very colorful and may grow up to 10 meters tall and 8 meters wide. It is a very hardy plant that is able to survive with a small supply of water and can brave very high/low temperatures. It may hybridize with other pears, producing, for example, Pyrus austriaca in a cross with Pyrus pyraster.

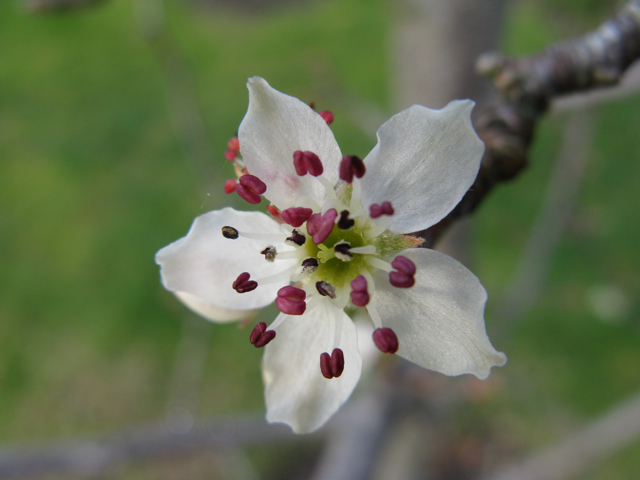
Flower close-up
