= Mandai (food) =

Indonesian fermented dish

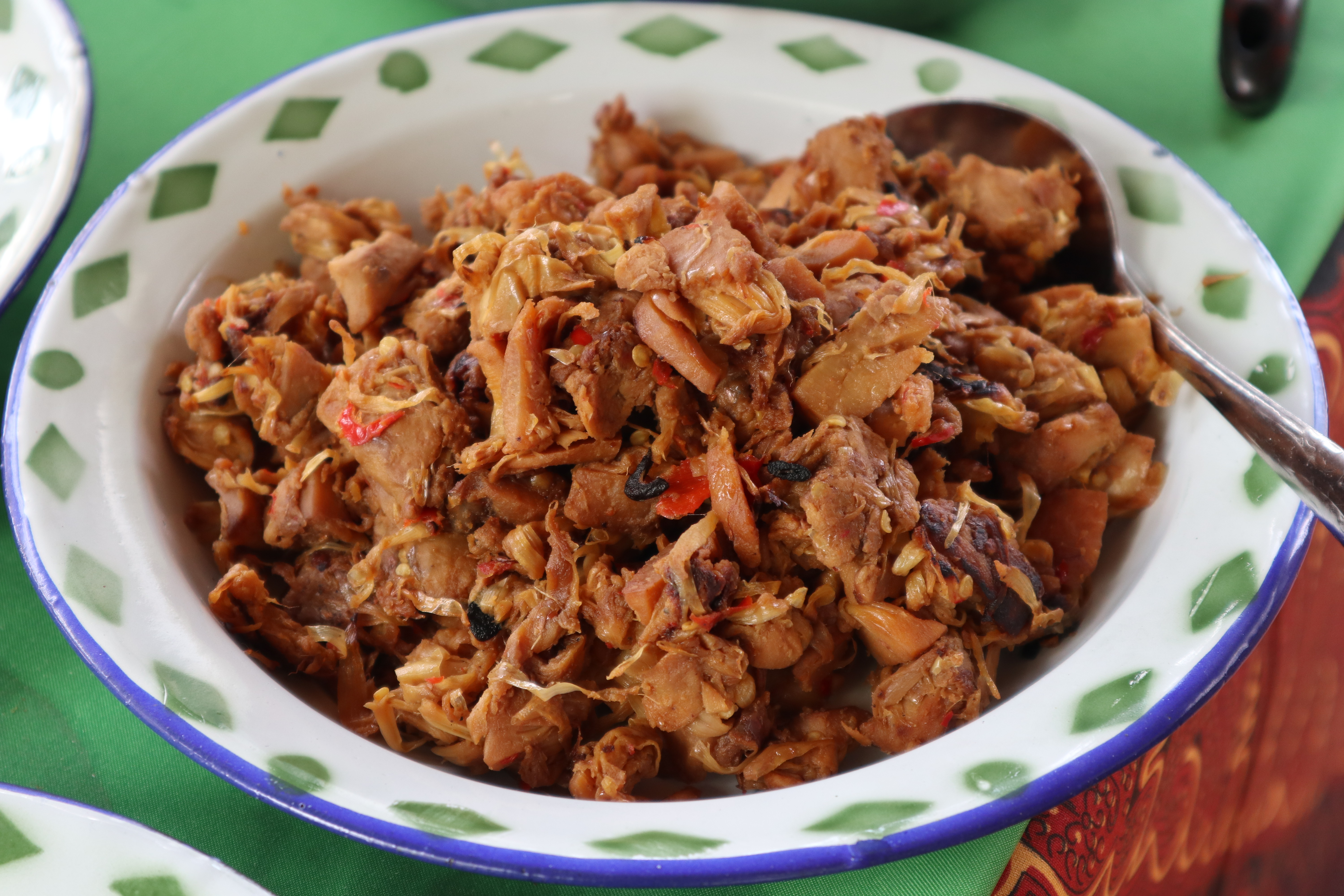
- Stir-fried mandai
- Place of origin: Kalimantan, Indonesia
- Main ingredients: Pith of cempedak or jackfruit

Mandai, also known as Dami, is a fermented food originating from Kalimantan in Indonesia, generally associated with the Banjar people and known as a local specialty of Banjarmasin. It is made through fermentation of the pith of the cempedak (Artocarpus integer) fruit or jackfruit in brine. It is eaten cooked with rice, processed as sambal, or prepared as a fried snack.

== Production ==
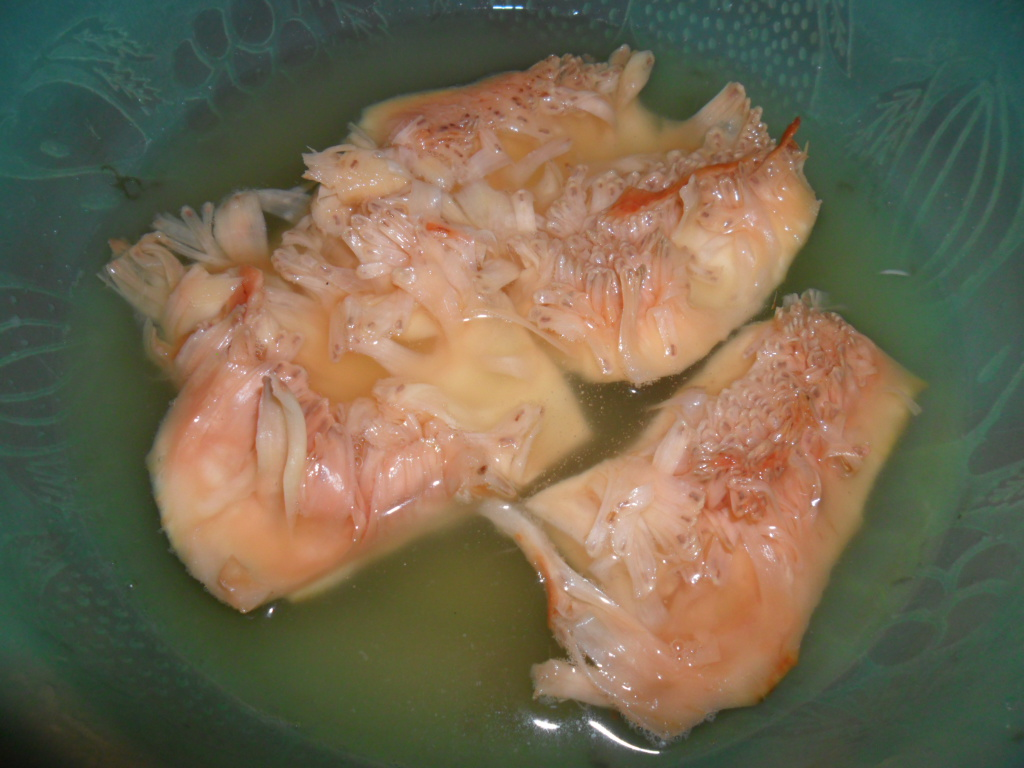
Mandai during the fermentation process

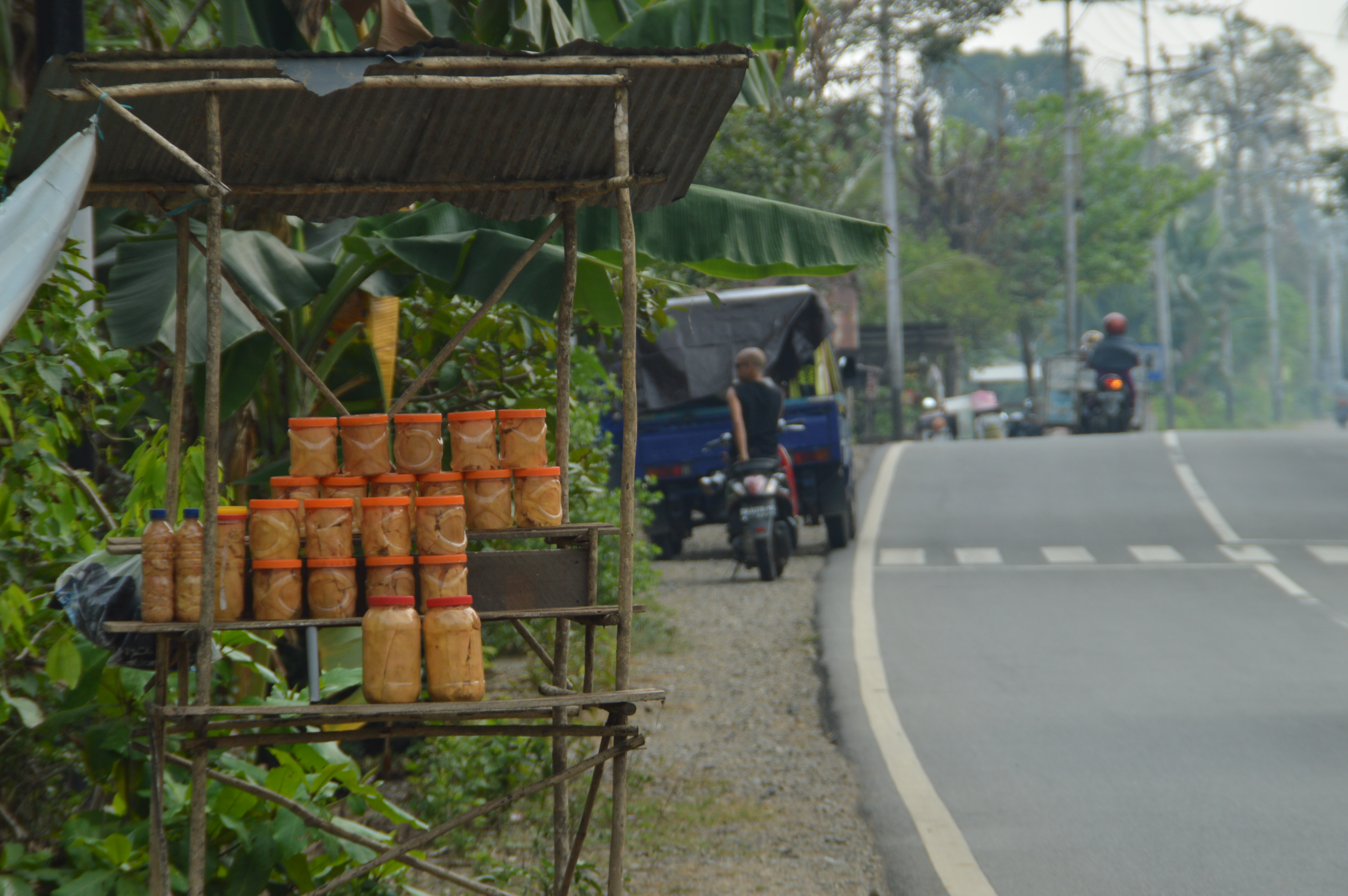
Mandai in jars for sale in Balangan

Mandai is mainly produced from the pith of the cempedak (Artocarpus integer) fruit, usually collected as a waste product after the main flesh had been removed. The pith is separated from the fruit's hard outer skin and cut into small pieces, before being salted and fermented in jars or basins. The pith is typically fermented for three to seven days at room temperature until it had softened and turned a yellowish color. Some mandai can be fermented for up to one month. The fermentation process is conducted by the lactic acid bacteria Lactiplantibacillus plantarum.

As cempedak trees produce fruit seasonally twice a year, the production of Mandai provided an additional food source when the trees are not fruiting. Mandai can generally be stored for up to a year. The food is typically associated with Banjarese cuisine. It is found in the provinces of Central Kalimantan, South Kalimantan and East Kalimantan, where it can be found in various restaurants. Mandai are also produced from the pith of the jackfruit (known as nangka locally), although the cempedak variety (known as mandai tiwadak in Banjarese) is generally more popular. They are often produced by small enterprises in Kalimantan, and sold in jars. Mandai sellers can be found at markets in cities such as Banjarmasin, where it is considered a local specialty.

== Use ==
The texture of Mandai has been described as meat-like, and springy with a sour-savory flavor. The meat-like texture led to Mandai being nicknamed "Banjarese steak". It can be cooked by itself and served with rice through stir-frying, roasting or baking, or ground with chilli to create a sambal variety known as sambal mandai. When stewed in coconut milk, it is known as mandai batanak. Mandai are also deep-fried into fritters as a snack.

== See also ==
- Tempoyak, fermented durian
- Asinan, general term for pickled vegetables in Indonesia
