= Megono =

Rice dish in Java, Indonesia

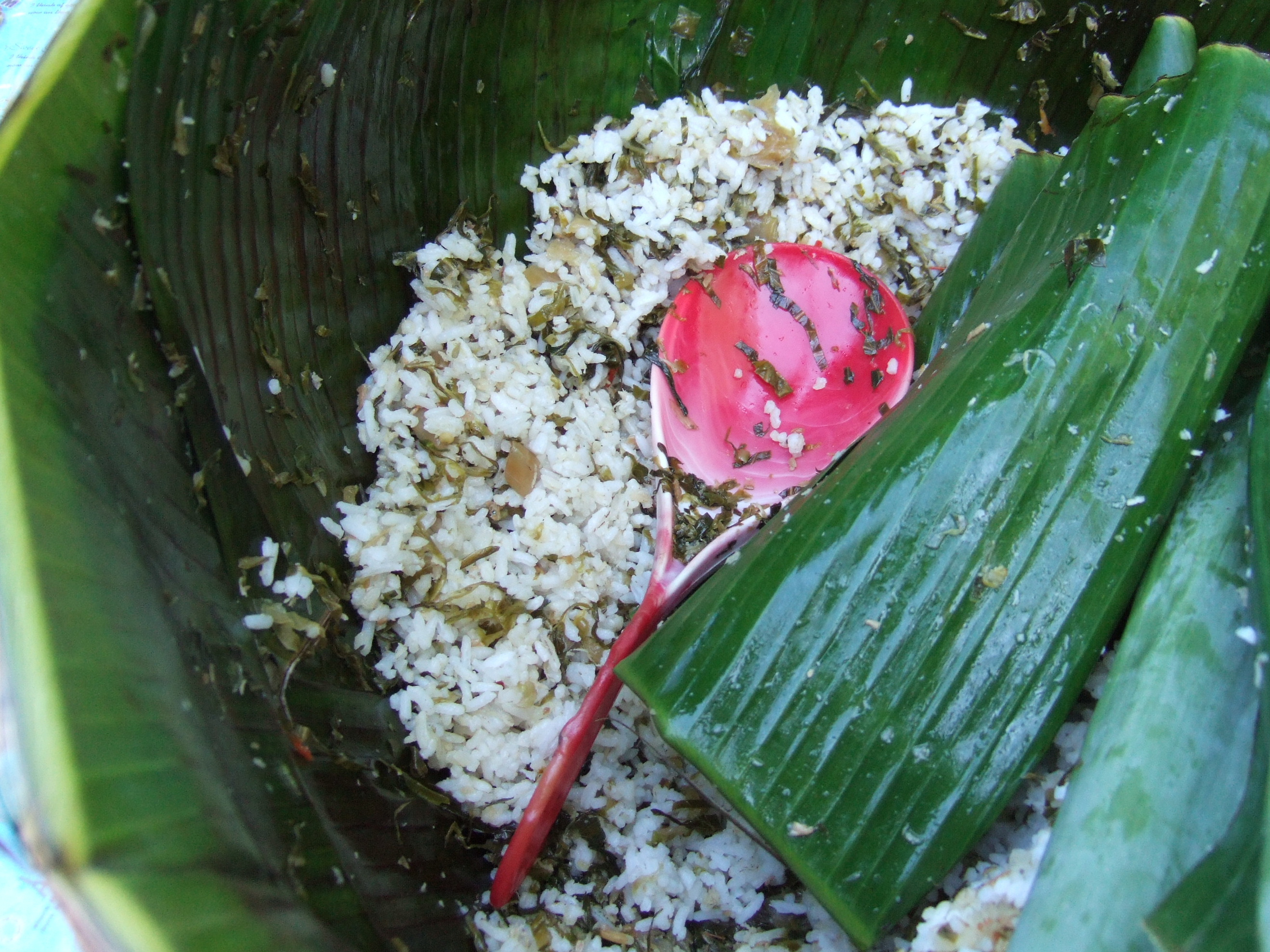
- A serving of nasi megono
- Course: Main course
- Place of origin: Indonesia
- Region or state: Central Java
- Serving temperature: Hot or room temperature
- Main ingredients: Rice topped with chopped young jackfruit, mixed with grated coconut, along with other spices

Megono (Javanese: ꦩꦼꦒꦤ, romanized: Mêgana) is a Javanese dish from the region of Central Java, Indonesia. Megono originally comes from the regency of Pekalongan on the north coast of Java, and consists of rice topped with chopped young jackfruit, mixed with grated coconut, along with other spices. Nasi megono is usually served with mendoan, a thin fried, half-cooked, starchy tempeh.

== Etymology ==
"Megono" comes from the Javanese word mergo, meaning "because", and ono, meaning "there is".
