= Domates mücveri =

Turkish appetizer

- Course: Appetizer
- Place of origin: Turkey
- Created by: Ottoman cuisine
- Serving temperature: hot, warm
- Main ingredients: Tomato paste

Domates mücveri are fried tomato balls served as an appetizer in Turkey. The dish is made from crushed or pureed tomatoes fried in oil. The batter is tomatoes and flour kneaded into a dough along with spices, parsley, onion, and mint; the dough is then fried in cooking oil and served as an appetizer.

== See also ==
- Mücver
- Latke
