= Tomatokeftedes =

Greek dish

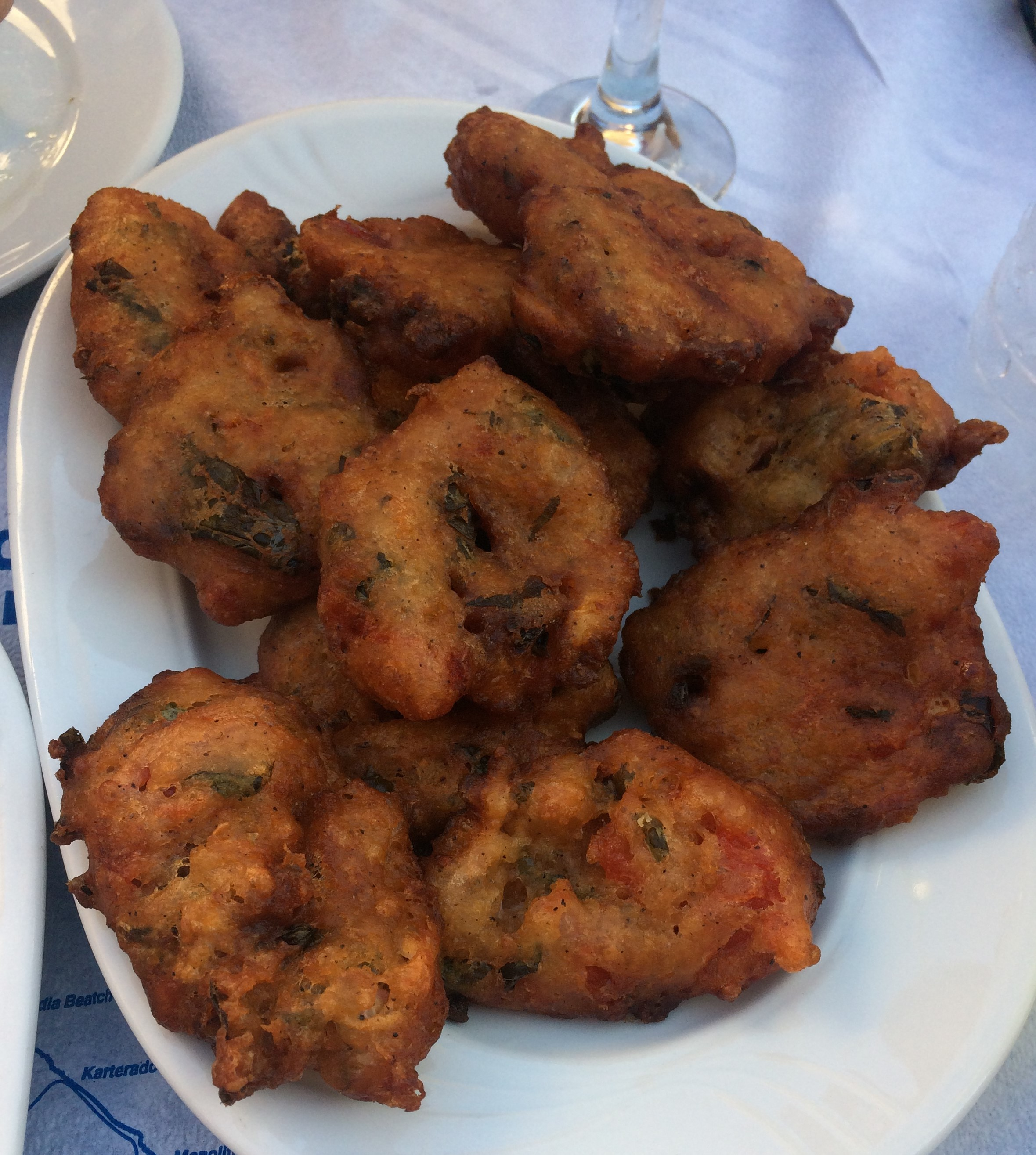
- A plate of tomatokeftedes served in Oia, Santorini
- Alternative names: Domatokeftedes
- Course: Appetizer
- Place of origin: Greece
- Region or state: Santorini, Thira (regional unit)
- Serving temperature: hot, warm
- Main ingredients: Tomato paste

Tomatokeftedes are fried tomato balls served as an appetizer on the Greek island of Santorini, and generally Cyclades. The dish is made from crushed or pureed tomatoes fried in oil. The batter is tomatoes and flour kneaded into a dough along with spices, parsley, onion, and mint; the dough is then fried in cooking oil and served as an appetizer. Santorini-grown tomatoes are preferred, as the island's rugged terrain and pumice-laced soil make for more robust fruits.
