= Fritter =

Deep-fried sweet or savoury snack

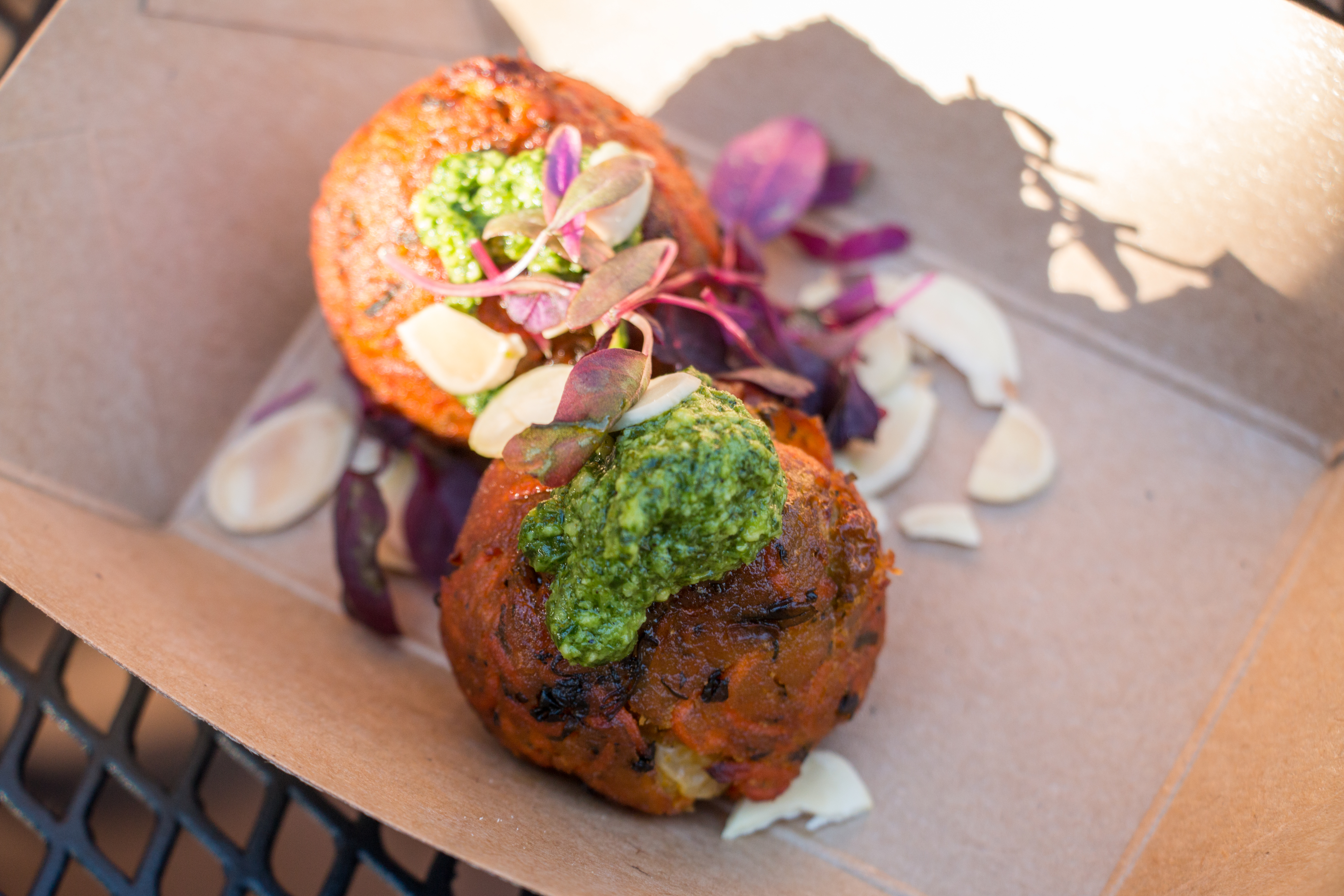
- Carrot and chickpea fritters
- Main ingredients: Batter or dough
- Ingredients generally used: Small pieces of meat, seafood, fruit, vegetables or other ingredients

A fritter is a portion of meat, seafood, fruit, vegetables, or other ingredients which has been battered or breaded, or just a portion of dough without further ingredients, that is deep-fried. Fritters are prepared in both sweet and savory varieties.

== Definition ==
The 1854 edition of An American Dictionary of the English Language by Noah Webster defines fritter as a transitive verb meaning "to cut meat into small pieces to be fried". Another definition from 1861 is given as "a pancake cont. chopped fruit, poultry, fish; also a small piece of meat fried".

== Varieties ==
=== Africa ===
==== West Africa ====
West African countries have many variations similar to fritters. The most common process includes the blending of peeled black-eyed peas with peppers and spices to leave a thick texture. A Yoruba version, akara, is a popular street snack and side dish in Nigerian culture. Another popular fritter made by Nigerians is 'puff-puff', typically made by deep-frying a dough containing flour, yeast, sugar, butter, salt, eggs and water. Ojojo is a Yoruba water yam fritter, while mosa is made from corn or plaintains. Dundun Oniyeri/ Yamarita is made from battered yam.

==== Egypt ====
Falafel, or taʿmiya (Arabic: طعمية, romanized: ṭaʿmiyya) is an example of a fritter widely eaten in Egypt as well as other countries in North Africa. In Egypt, it is made from crushed fava beans which are mixed with various herbs and spices and then deep-fried.

==== South Africa ====
Pumpkin fritters (commonly known as pampoenkoekies), usually served with cinnamon sugar and served at any time of day, are popular in South Africa. Variations often include banana instead of pumpkin.

==== Kenya ====
Fritters are commonly referred to as bhajia or viazi karai, and are a popular street snack in Kenya.

=== Asia ===
==== South Asia ====
Fritters are common roadside snacks all over South Asia and are commonly referred to as pakora (pakoda) or bhaji (bhajia) in local parlance. The onion bhaji is especially well-known.

In India and Pakistan, a pakora is a fritter of assorted vegetables and spices.

In the South Indian state of Kerala, banana fritters are popular.

Piyaji is a Bengali dish of fritters with onions.

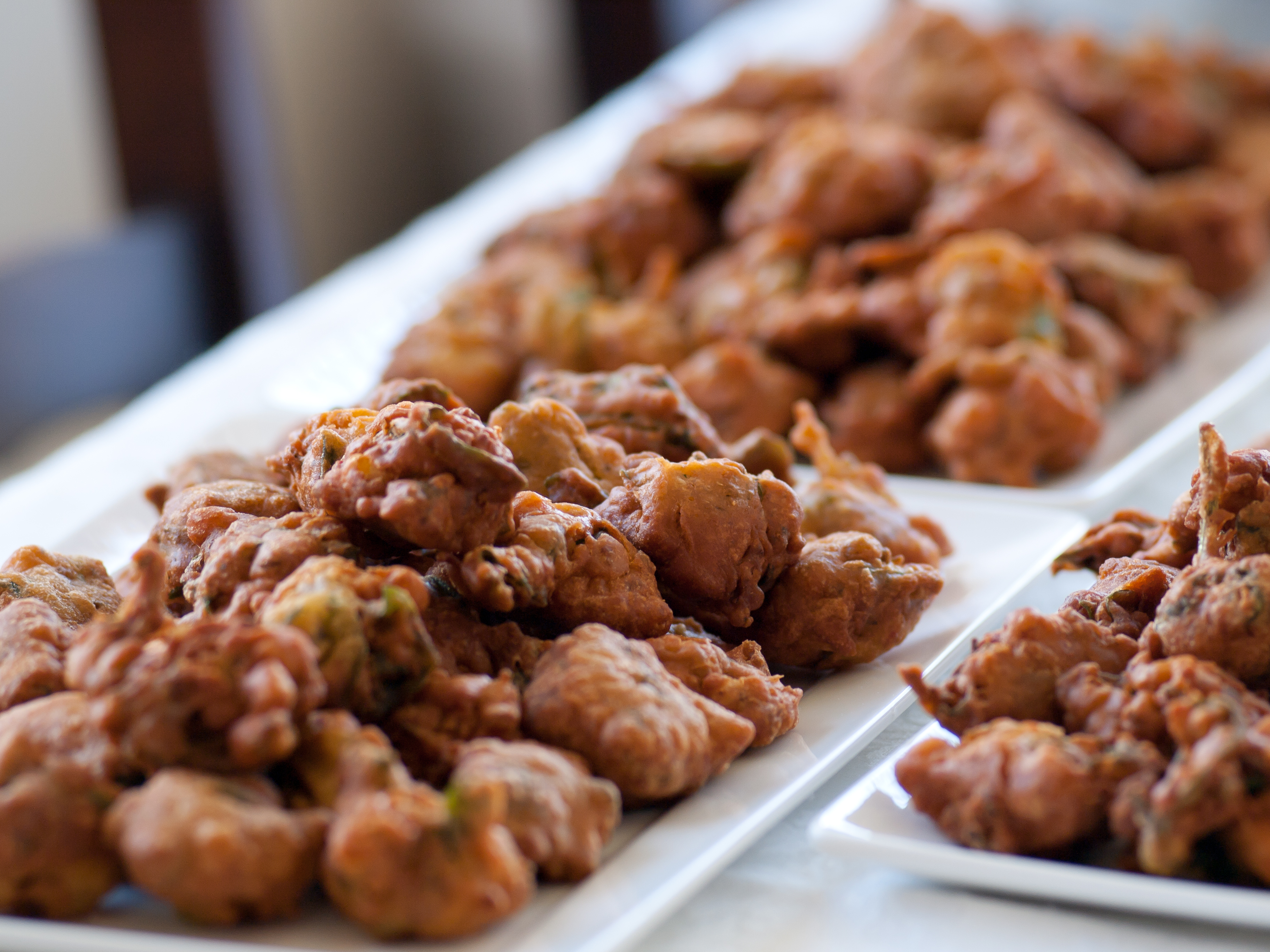
Chilli pakoras

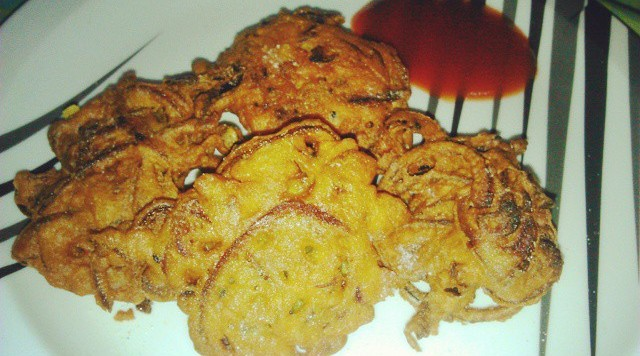
Onion fritters (piyaji), a Bengali dish

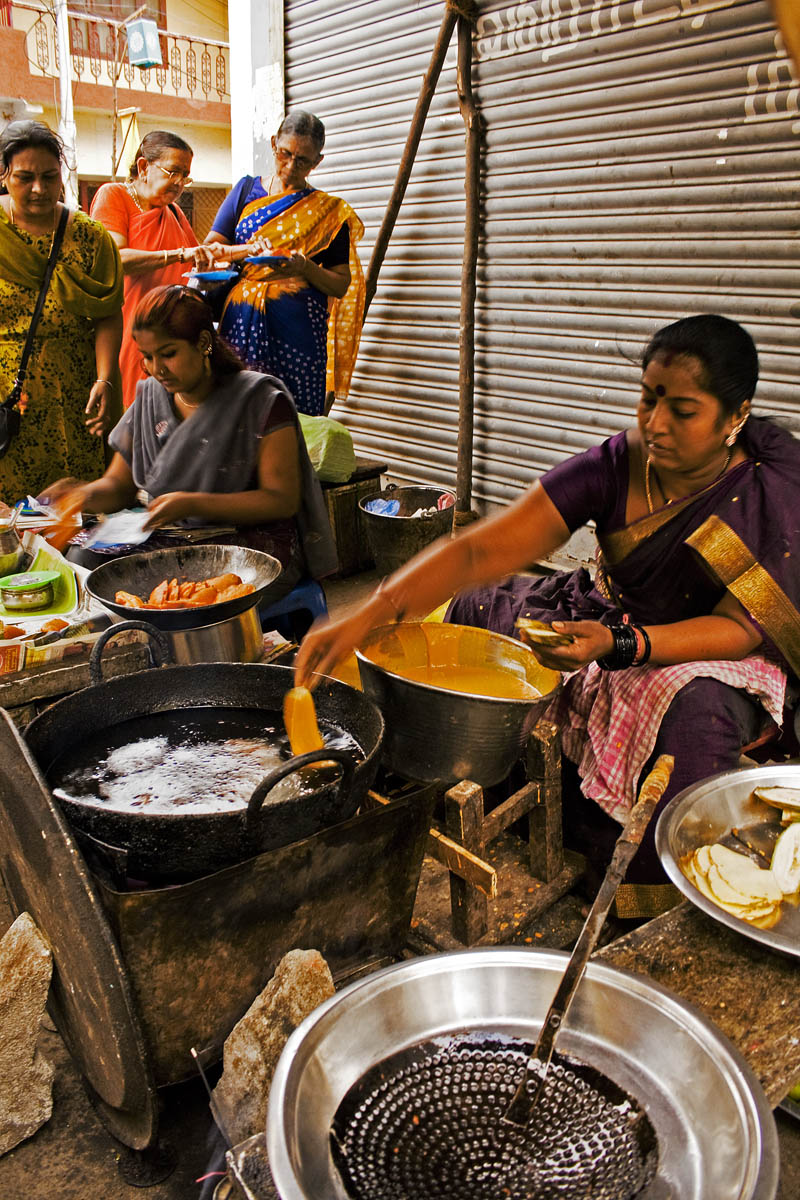
A woman making bajjis in Mylapore

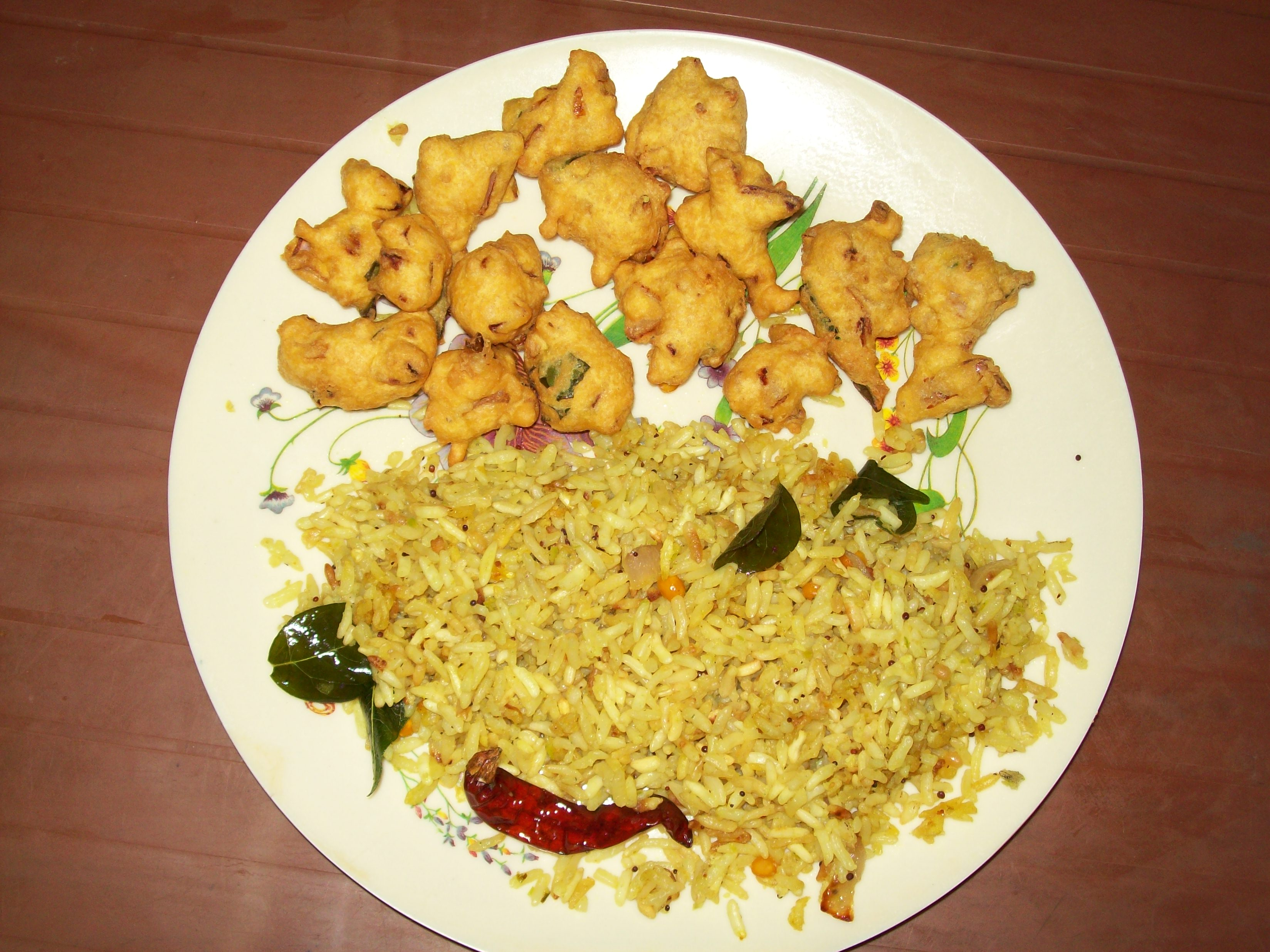
Uggani bajji, rice and fritters, a typical breakfast in Rayalaseema

==== Southeast Asia ====
===== Brunei =====
In Brunei, fritters are known as cucur and they are eaten as snacks. Cucur is also part of local street food and usually sold in street market-style food booth (locally known as gerai). They are usually made with fillings which are commonly made with banana, shrimp, yam, sweet potatoes and vegetables (usually sliced cabbages or carrots). Some local fruits, when they are in season, are also made into cucur, most commonly durian, breadfruit (sukun), tibadak (Artocarpus integer) and tarap (Artocarpus odoratissimus).

===== Indonesia =====
In Indonesia, fritters come under the category of gorengan (Indonesian: fritters, from goreng "to fry"), and many varieties are sold on travelling carts or by street vendors throughout Indonesia. Various kinds of ingredients are battered and deep-fried, such as bananas (pisang goreng), tempe mendoan, tahu goreng (fried tofu), oncom, sweet potato, cassava chunk, cassava tapai, cireng (tapioca fritters), bakwan (flour with chopped vegetables), Tahu isi (filled tofu), and breadfruit. These are often eaten accompanied by fresh bird's eye chili. The variety known as bakwan commonly contains flour with chopped vegetables such as carrot and cabbage, whereas the fried patties called perkedel typically consist of mashed potatoes or ground corn (perkedel jagung or bakwan jagung).

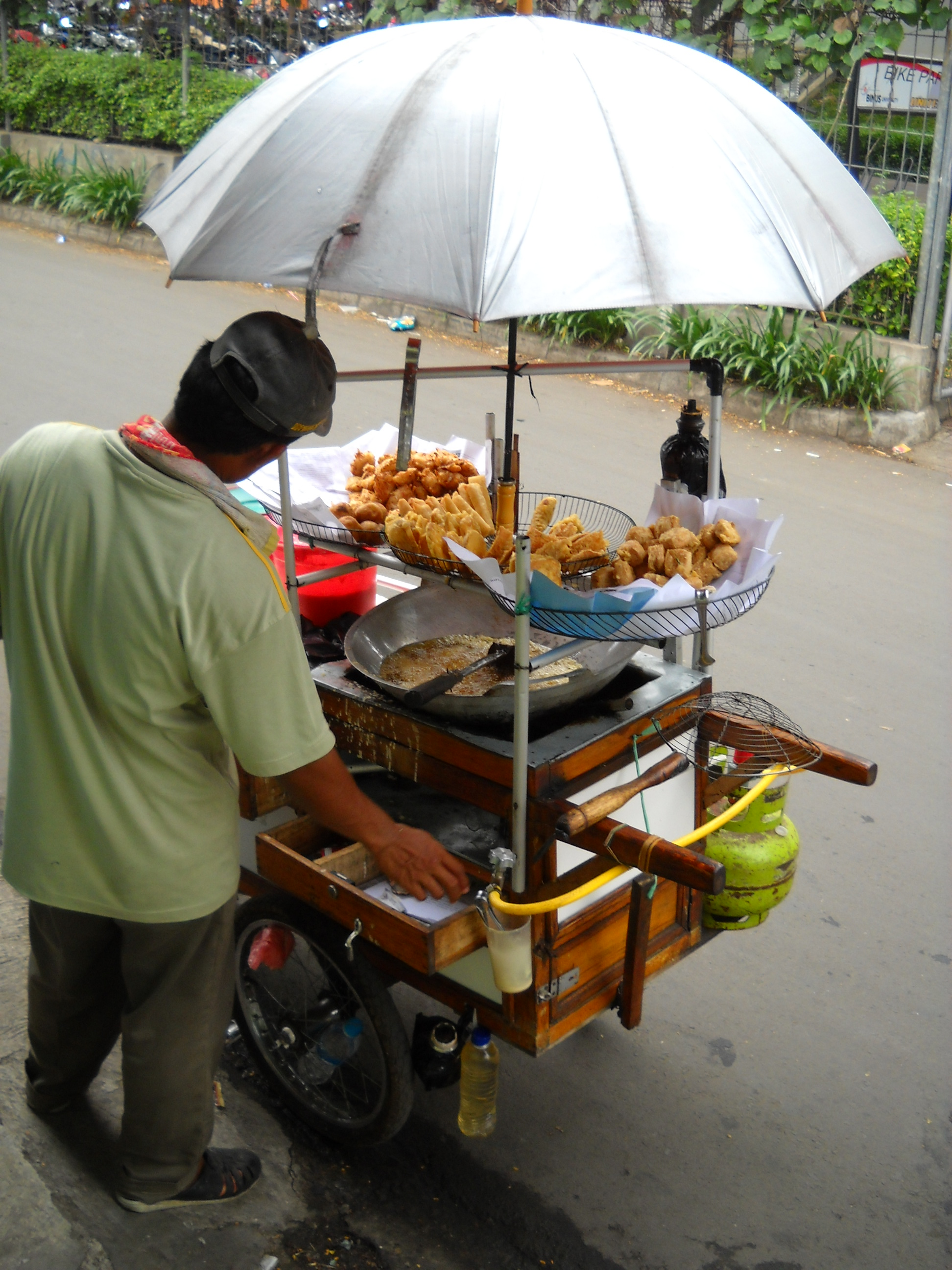
Gorengan, Indonesian street vendor of assorted fritters

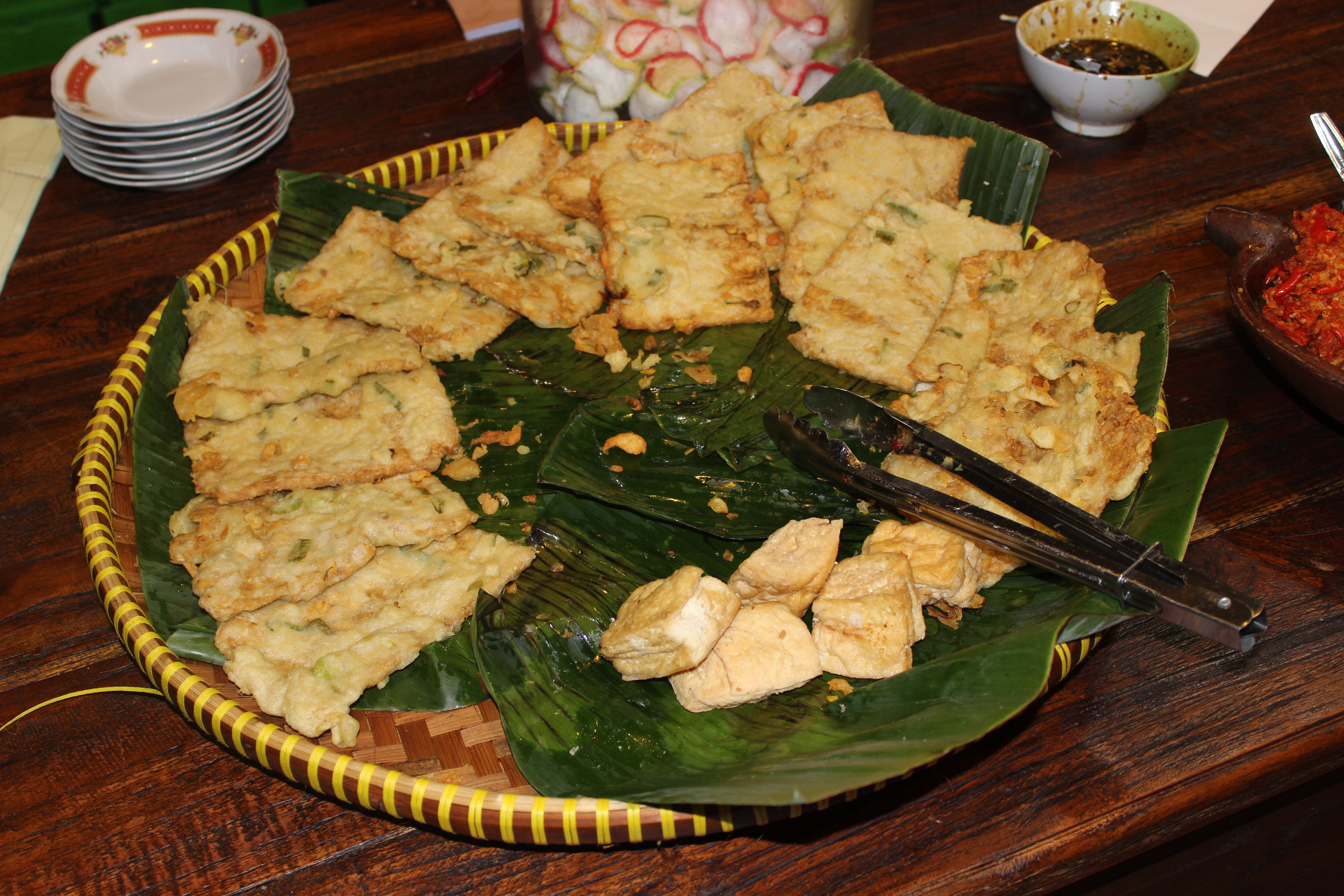
Indonesian tempeh mendoan and tofu fritters

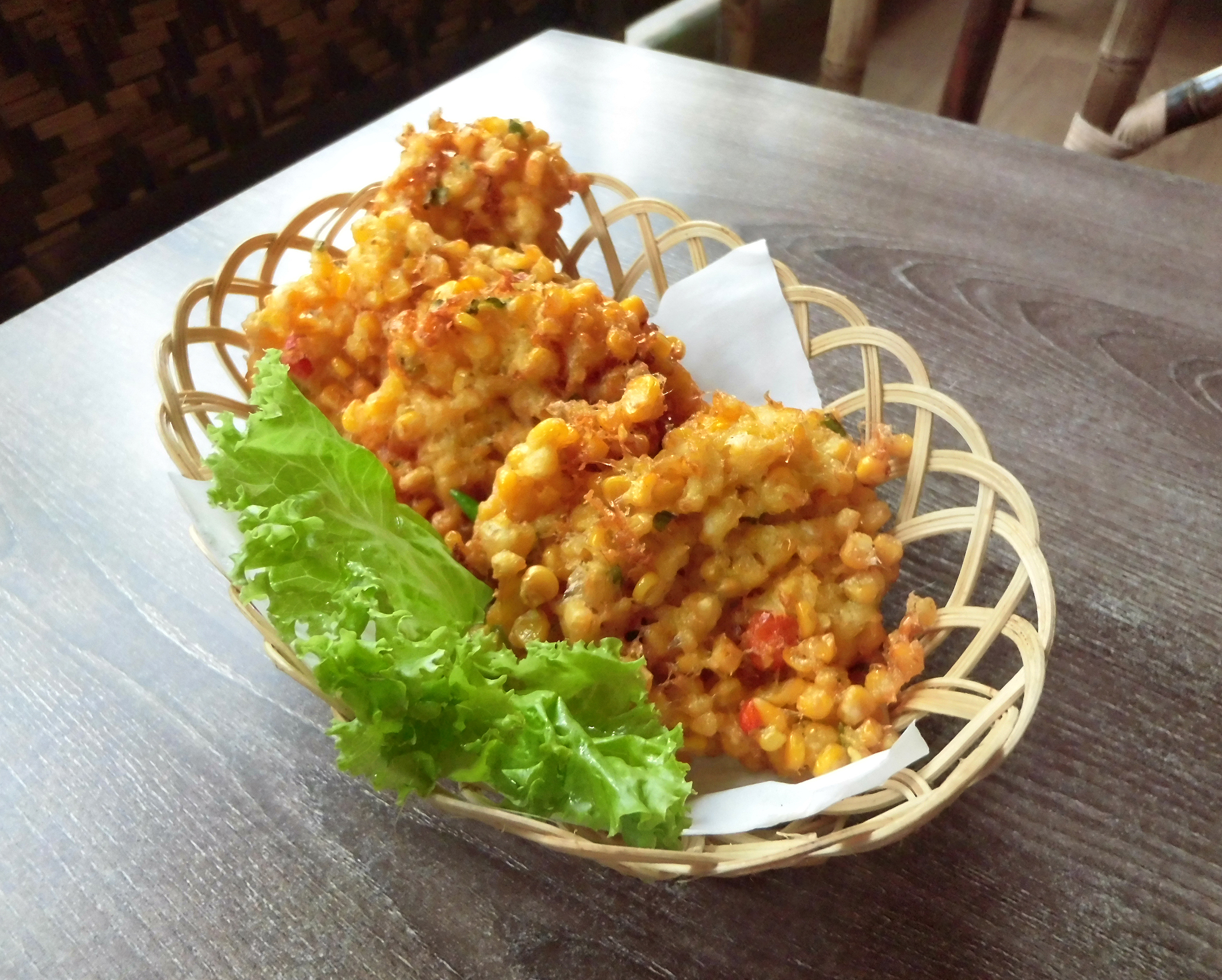
Bakwan jagung, Indonesian corn fritter

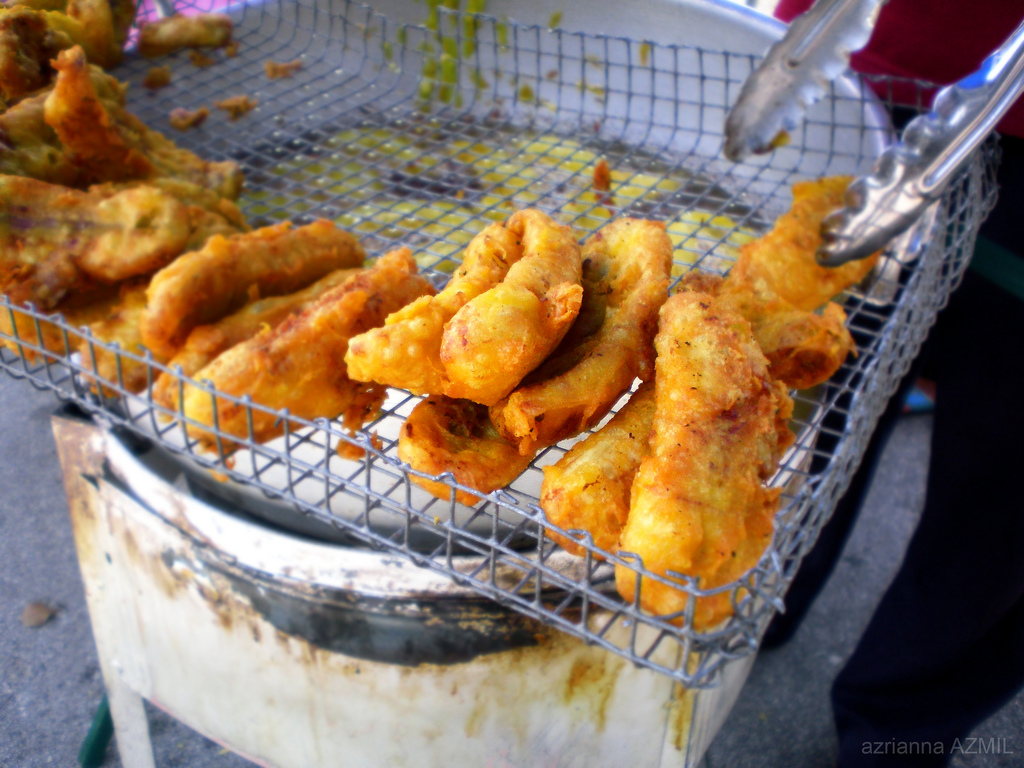
Fritter peddler offering pisang goreng, Indonesian banana fritter

===== Malaysia =====
In Malaysia, it is common for a type of fritter called "cucur" (such as yam, sweet potato and banana) to be fried by the roadside in a large wok and sold as snacks.

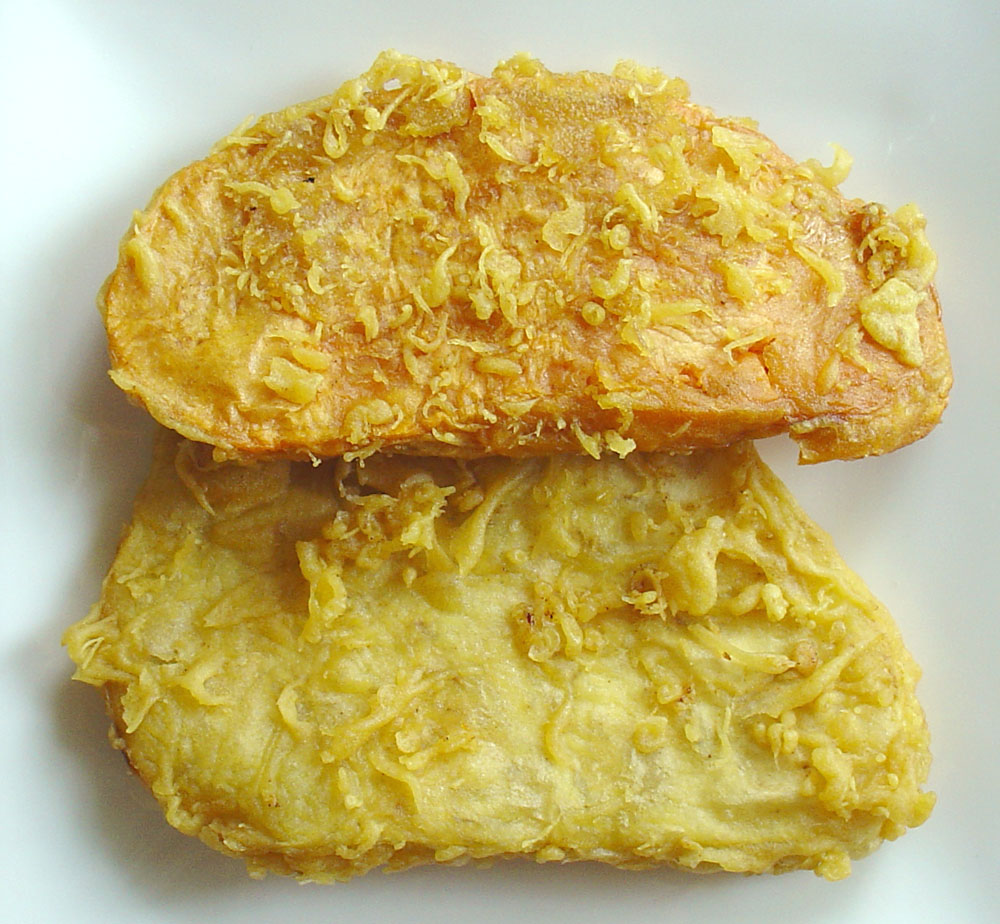
Malaysian roadside yam and sweet potato fritters

===== Myanmar =====
In Burmese cuisine, fritters are called a-kyaw (Burmese: အကြော်), while assorted fritters are called a-kyaw-sone (Burmese: အကြော်စုံ). The most popular a-kyaw is the gourd fritter (ဘူးသီးကြော်). Diced onions, chickpea, potatoes, a variety of leafy vegetables, brown bean paste, Burmese tofu, chayote, banana and crackling are other popular fritter ingredients. Black beans are made into a paste with curry leaves to make bayagyaw—small fritters similar to falafel. Unlike pisang goreng, Burmese banana fritters are made only with overripe bananas with no sugar or honey added.

The savory fritters are eaten mainly at breakfast or as a snack at tea. Gourd, chickpea and onion fritters are cut into small parts and eaten with Mohinga, Myanmar's national dish. These fritters are also eaten with Kao hnyin baung rice and with Burmese green sauce—called chin-saw-kar or a-chin-yay. Depending on the fritter hawker, the sauce is made from chili sauce diluted with vinegar, water, cilantro, finely diced tomatoes, garlic and onions.

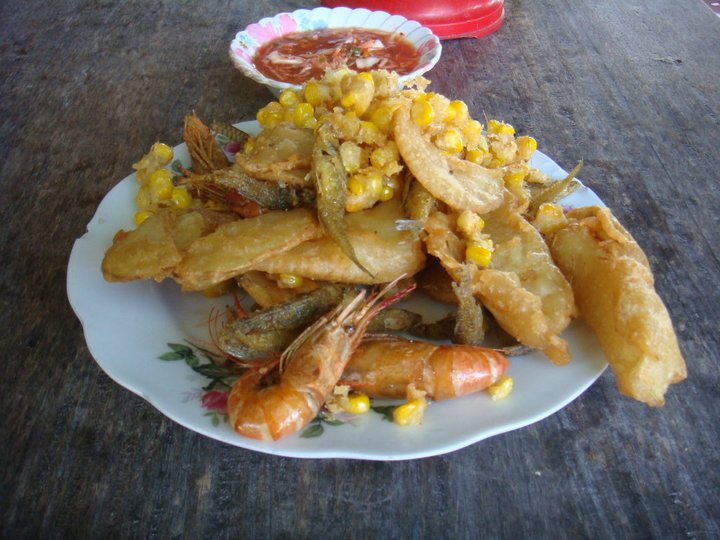
Fried snacks of Myanmar

===== Philippines =====
In the Philippines, egg fritters are called tokneneng (duck) or kwek-kwek (quail), and squid fritters are called kalamares. These, along with shrimp fritters called okoy, and banana fritters called maruya are also sold in travelling carts or street side vendors.

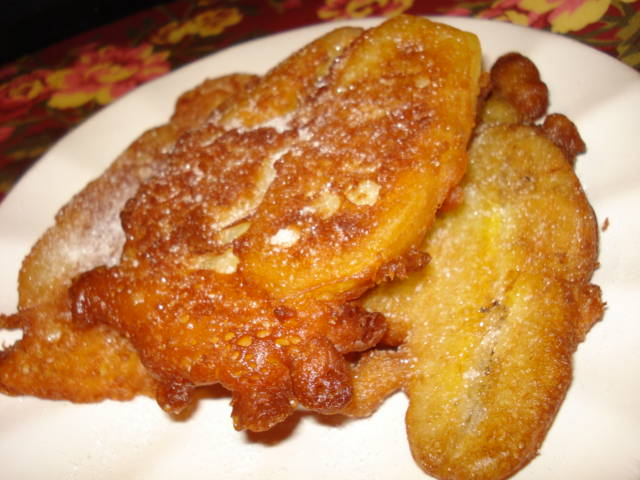
Maruya or kumbo, banana fritters

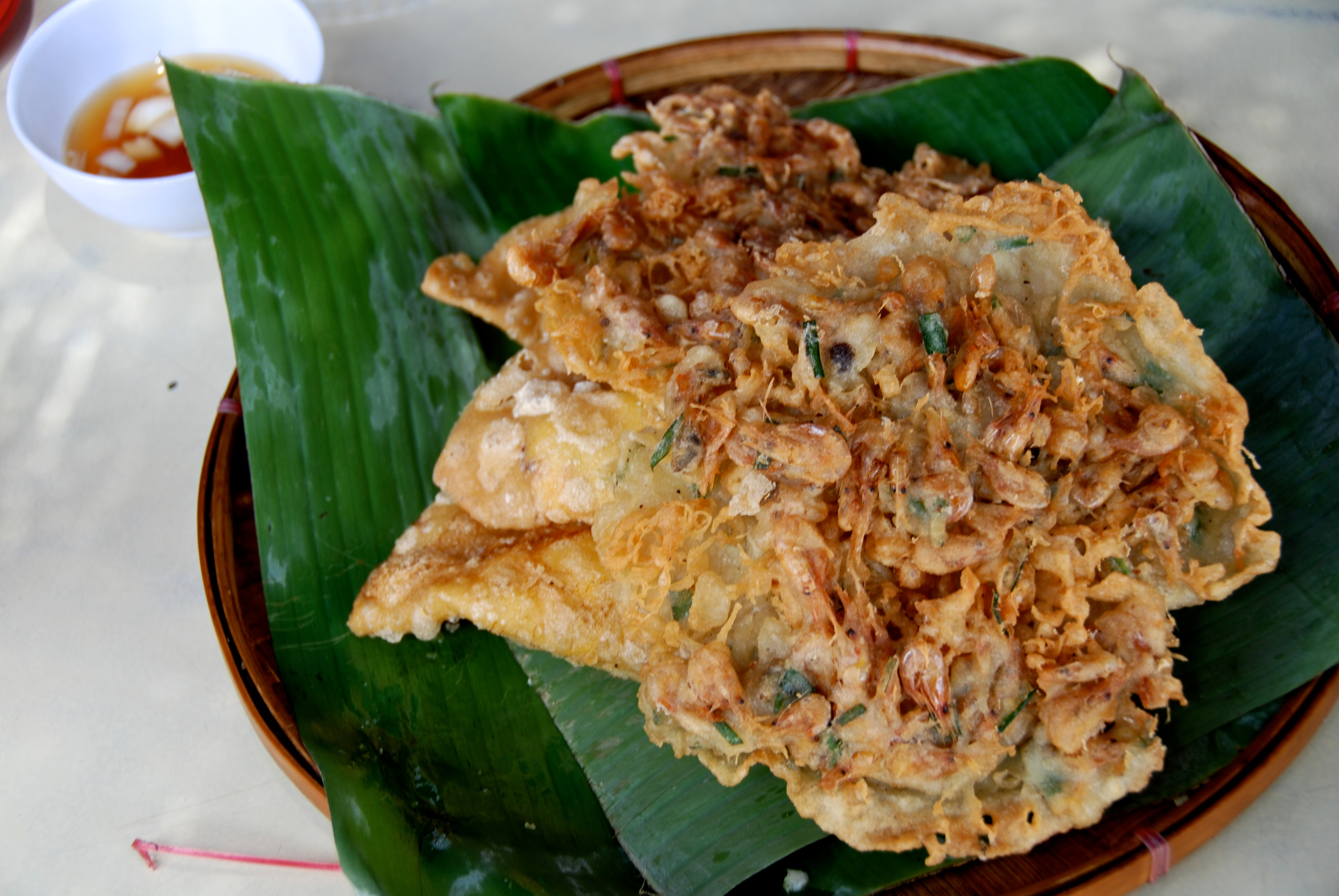
Okoy, shrimp and glutinous rice flour fritters

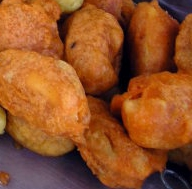
Kwek-kwek, quail egg fritters

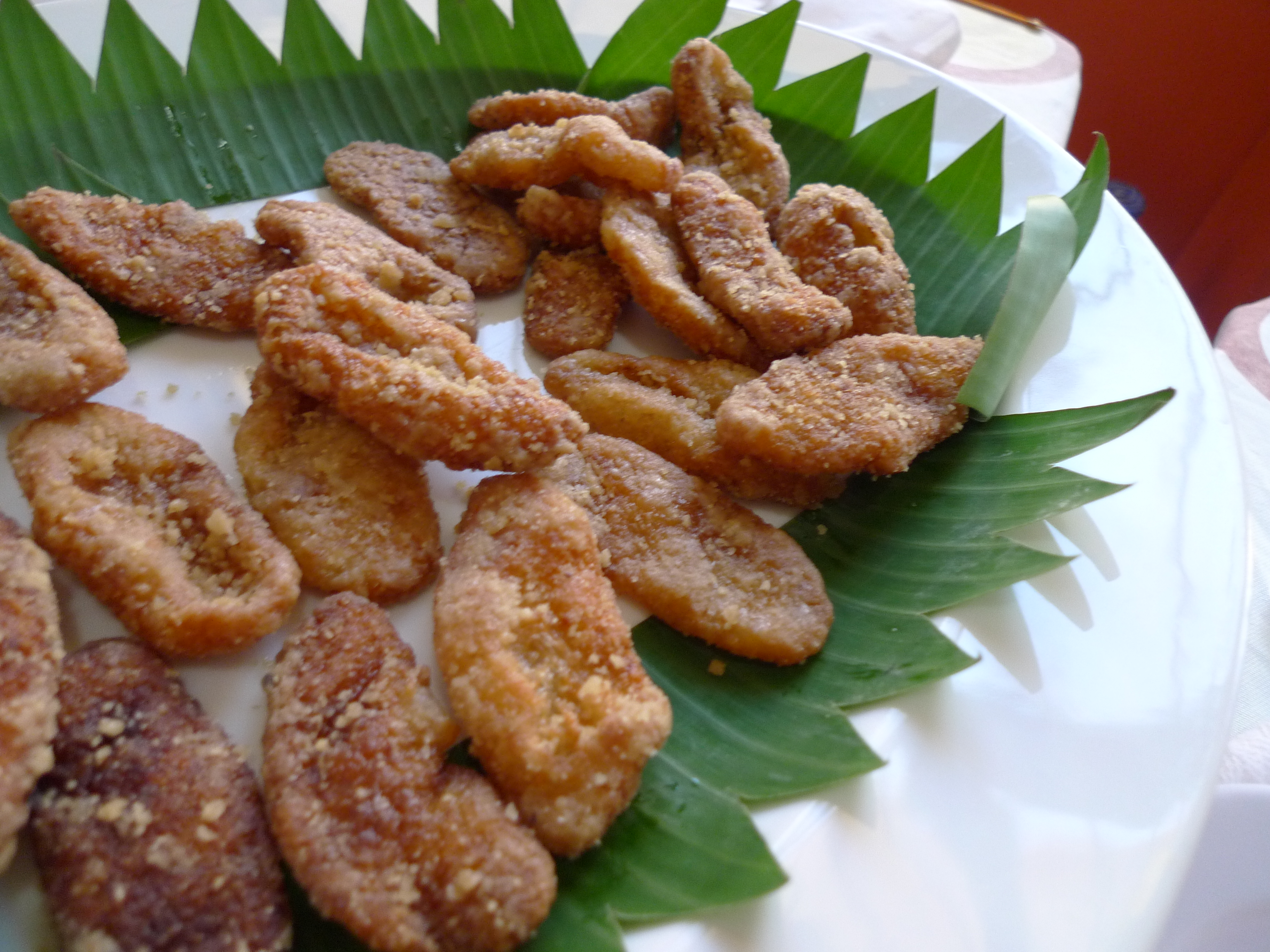
Pinakufu, glutinous rice flour fritters coated in sugar and coconut

===== Thailand =====
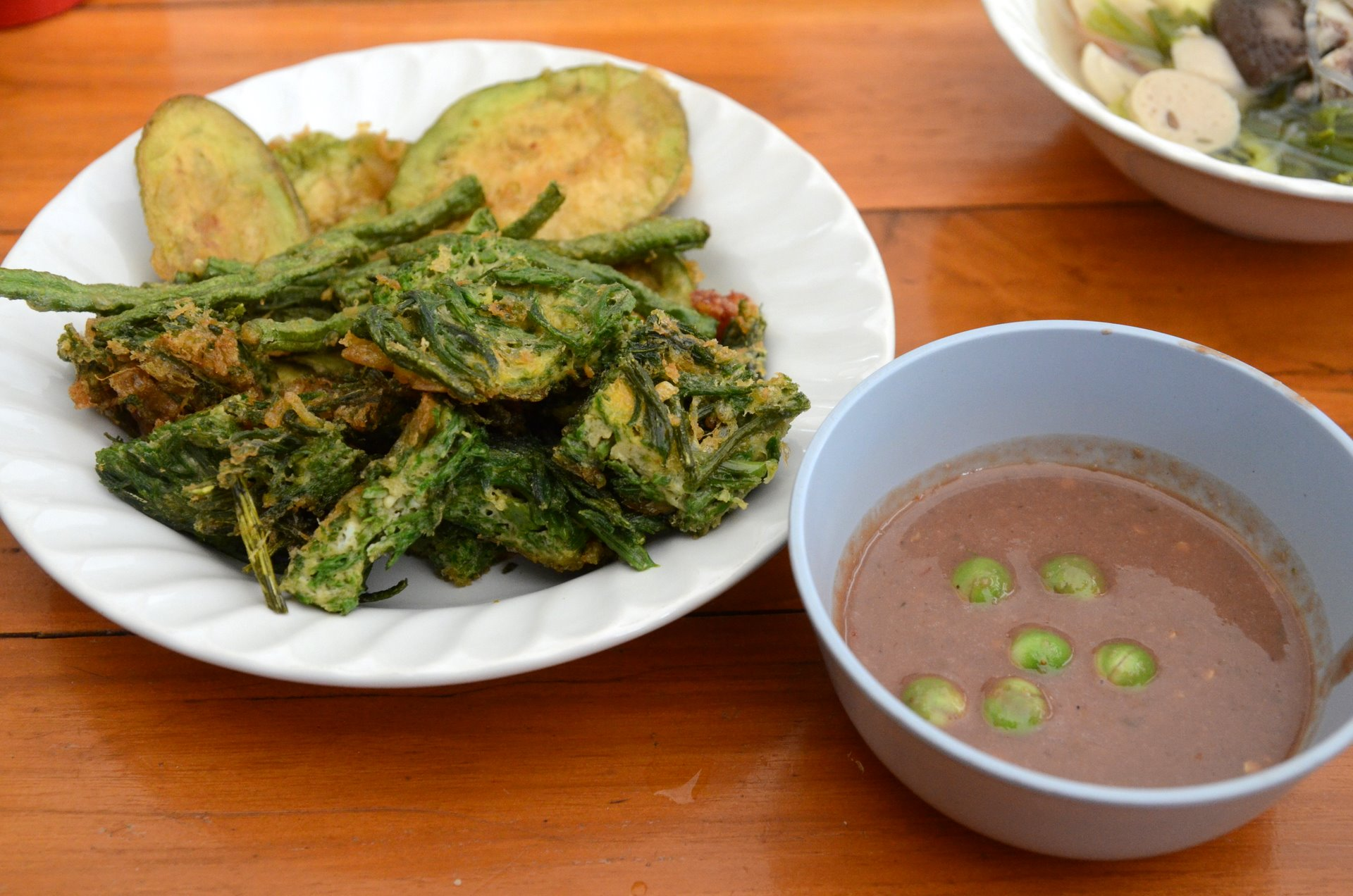
Nam phrik kapi served with vegetable fritters; a common dish in Thai cuisine

==== East Asia ====
===== China =====
Throughout China, fritters are sold at roadsides. They may contain pork, but are commonly vegetarian.

A couple making fritters in Hainan, China. Each contains some fermented beans, chopped spring onion, and a small cube of pork meat. These sell for 5 mao (jiao), equivalent to around 8 US cents.

===== Japan =====
In Japanese cuisine, takoyaki is a type of ball-shaped fritter made with a wheat batter, minced octopus, ginger and tempura scraps. Tempura is vegetable or seafood dipped and fried in a light crispy batter and served as a common accompaniment to meals.

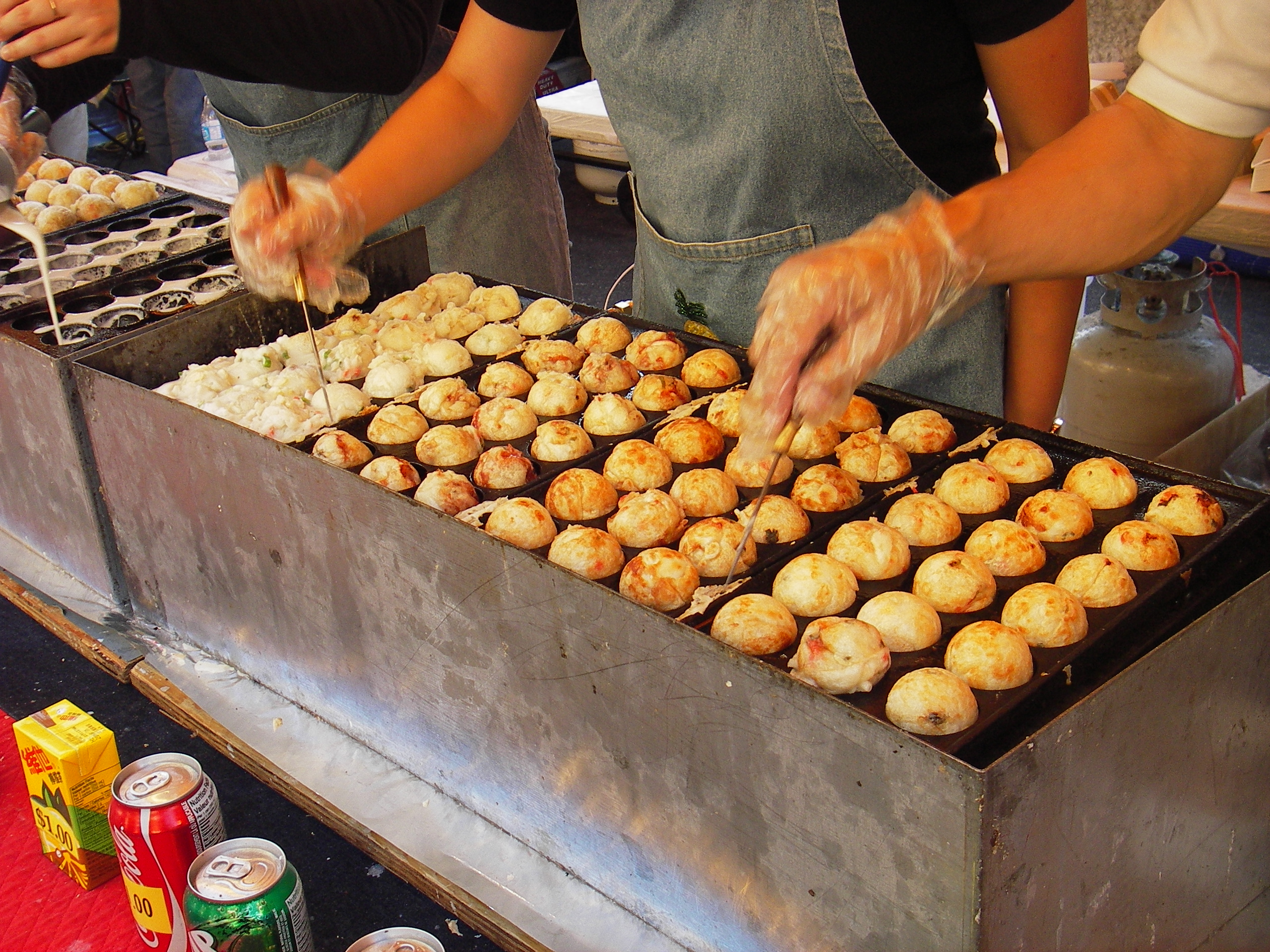
Takoyaki being prepared

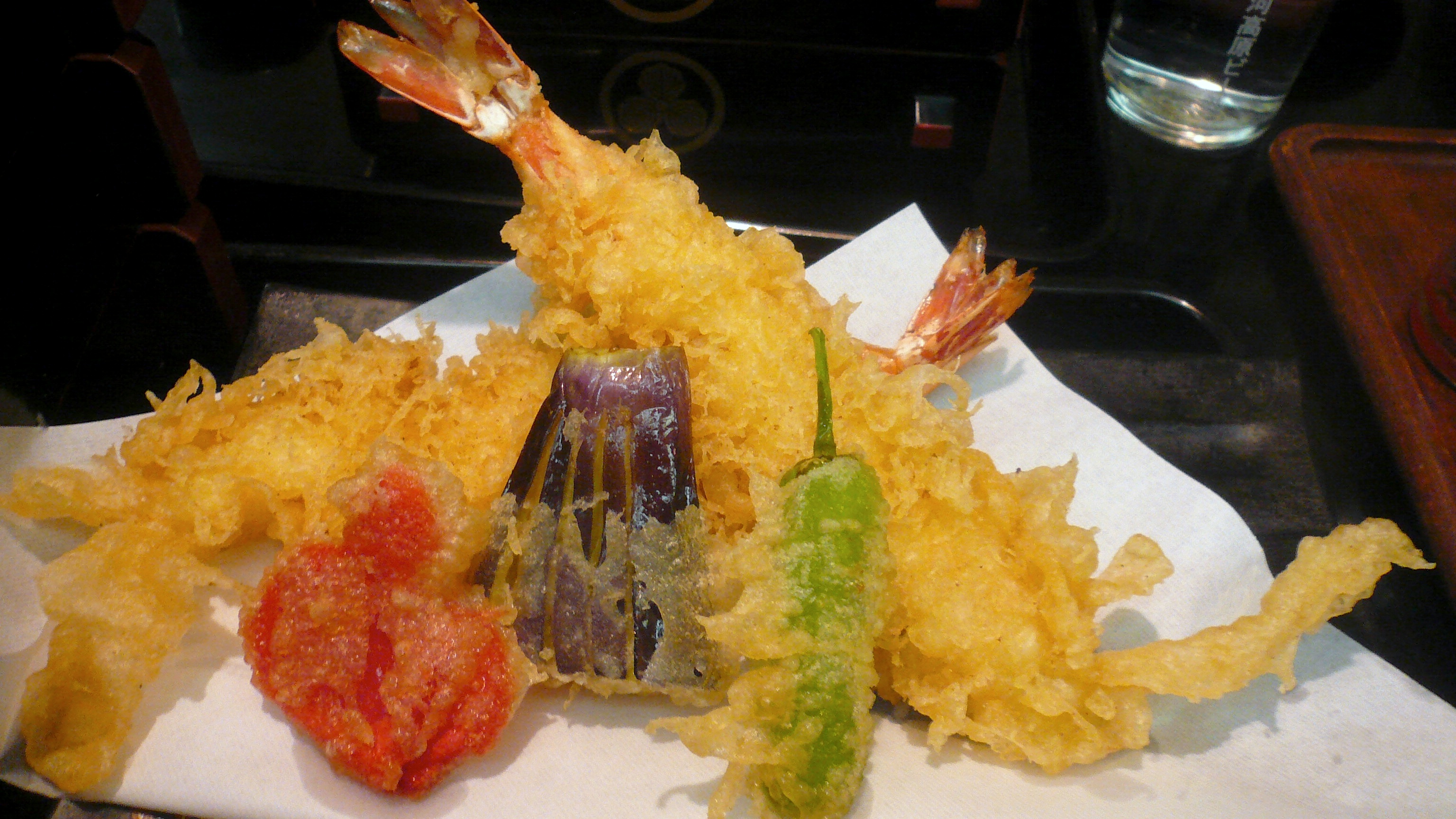
Tempura

===== Korea =====
In Korean cuisine, deep-fried foods are known as twigim (튀김). Twigim is often battered and breaded, but there are varieties without breading, as well as varieties without breading and batter. Popular twigim dishes include dak-twigim (fried chicken), gim-mari-twigim (fried seaweed roll), goguma-twigim (fried sweet potato), gul-twigim (fried oyster), ojingeo-twigim (fried squid), and saeu-twigim (fried shrimp).

Traditional vegetarian deep-fried foods associated with Korean temple cuisine include twigak and bugak. Twigak are made from vegetables such as dasima (kelp) and bamboo shoot, without breading or batter. Bugak are made from vegetables such as dasima, perilla leaves, and chili peppers, which are coated with glutinous rice paste and dried thoroughly.

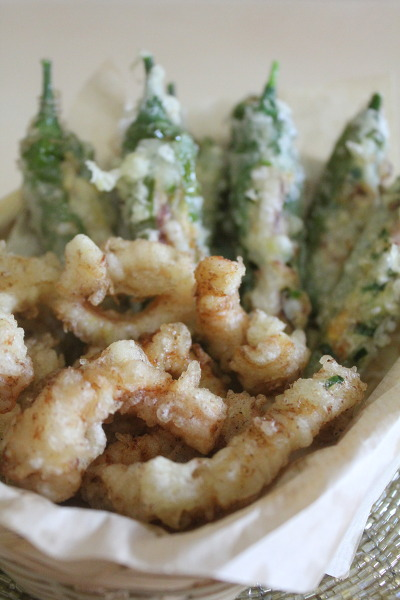
Korean Ojingeo-twigim (squid fritters) and gochu-twigim (chilli fritters)

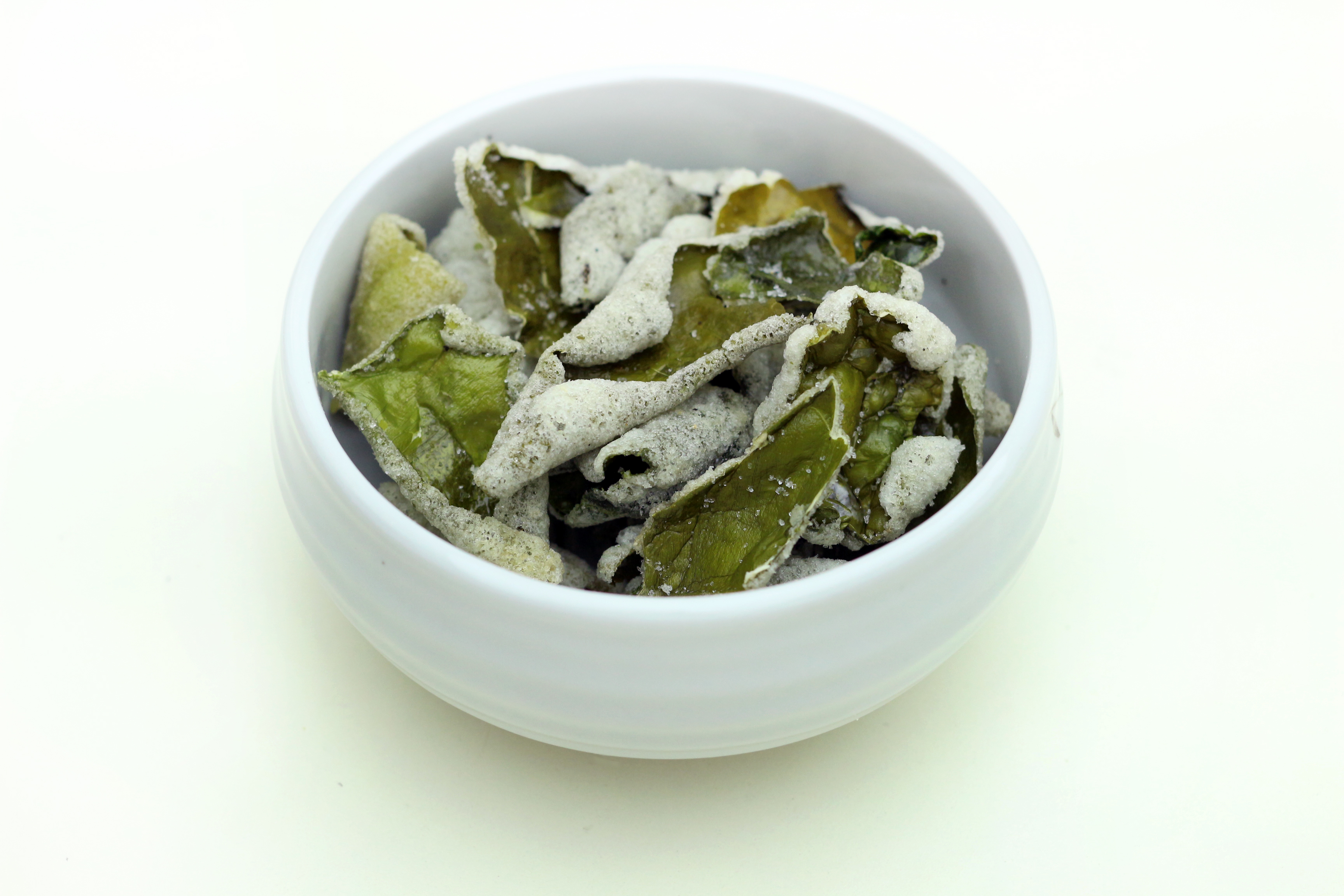
Dasima-bugak (coated kelp fries)

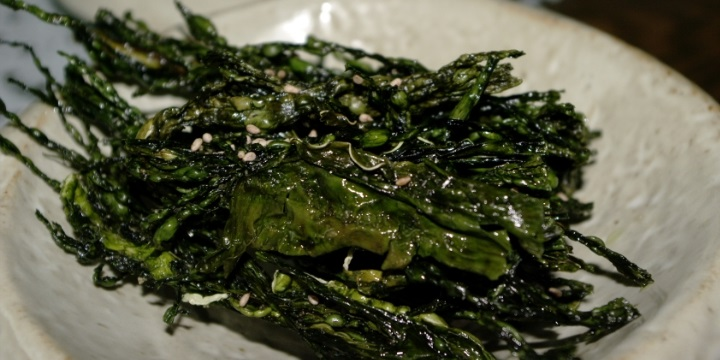
Miyeok-twigak (seaweed fries)

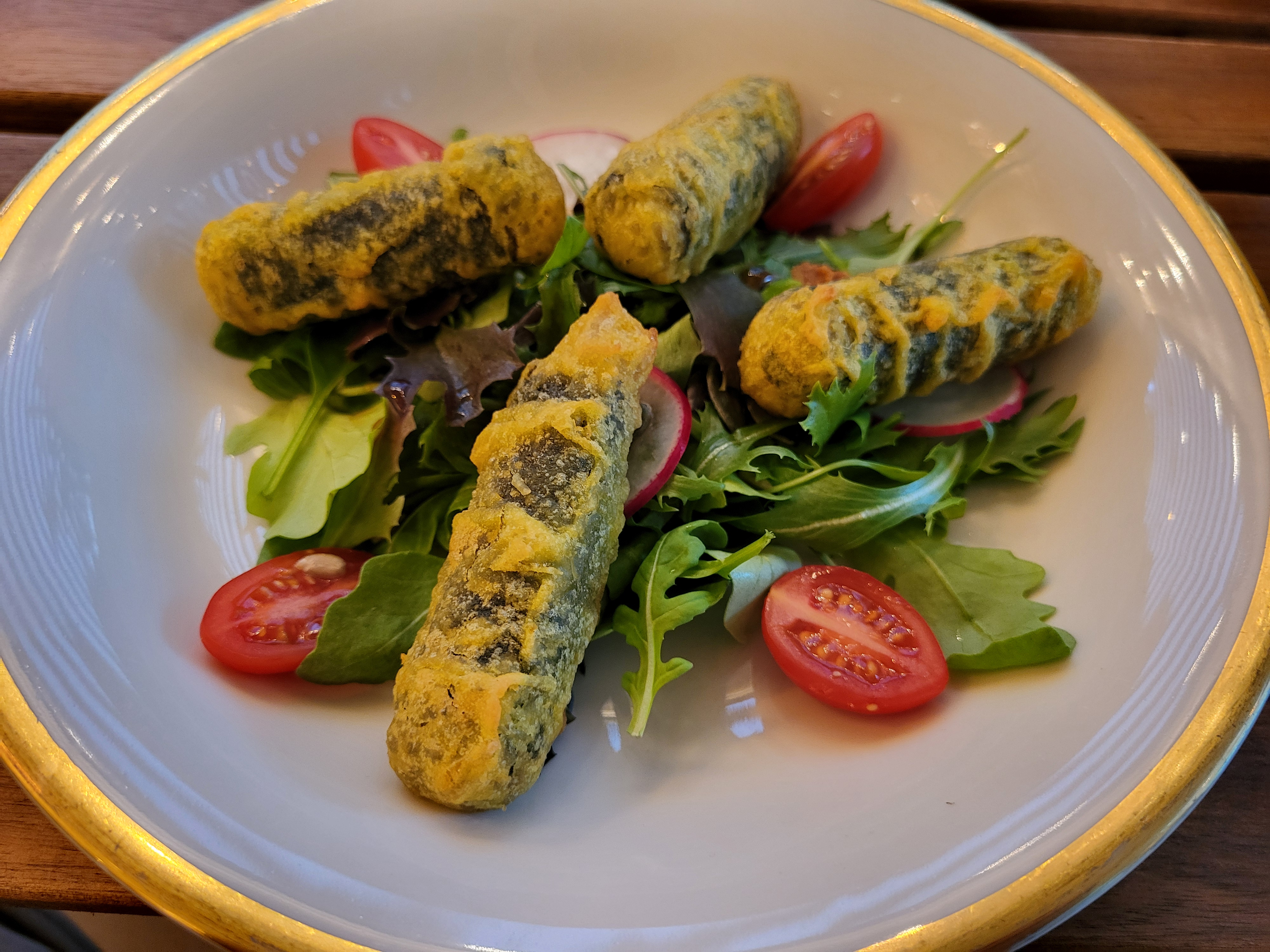
Gim-mari-twigim

==== West Asia ====
===== Iran =====
The Iranian variety is called kuku, which comes in different versions like the ones with potatoes or the ones with herbs. This type of fritter resembles a crustless quiche.

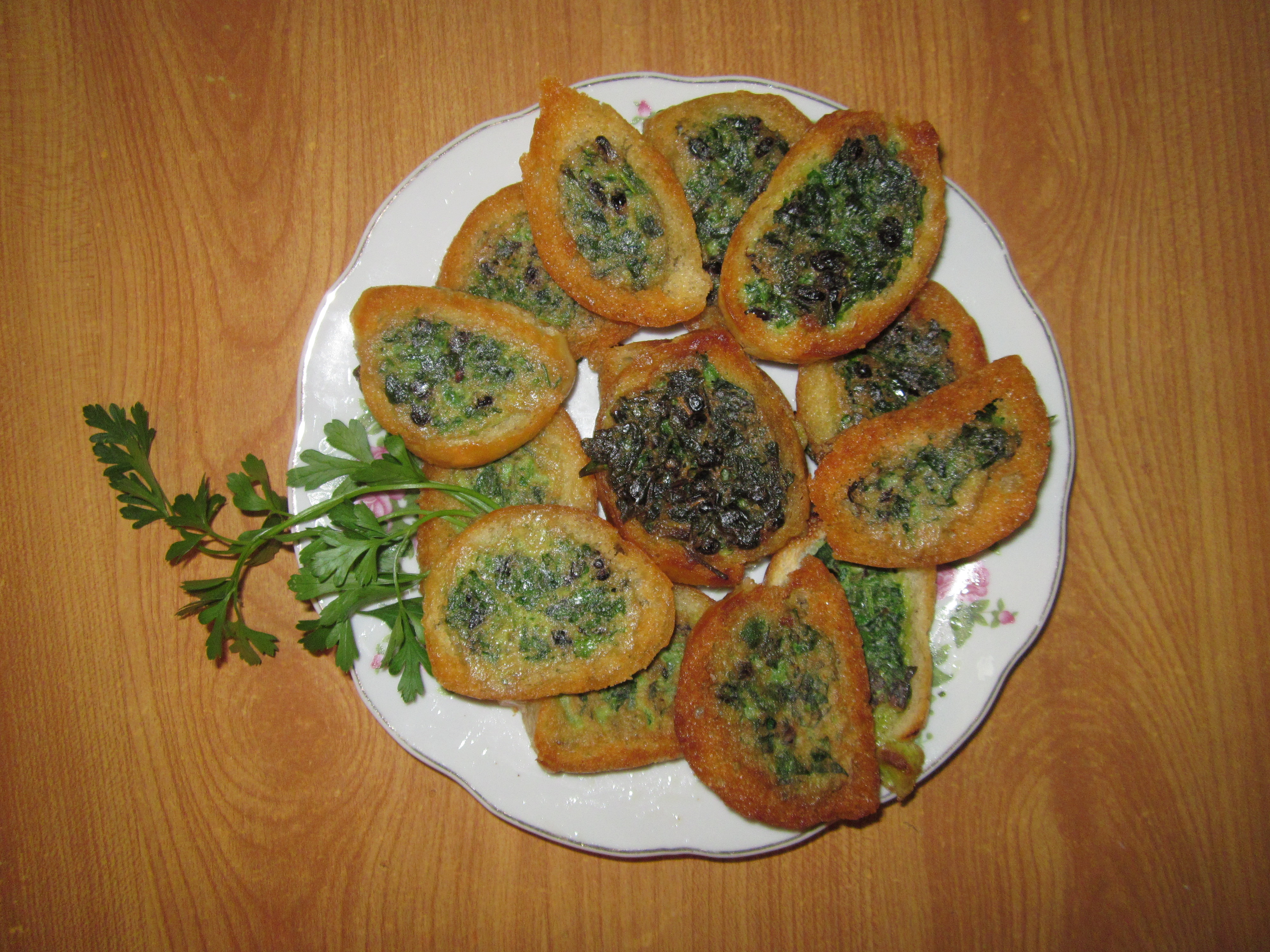
Kuku-sabzi

=== Oceania ===
==== Australia ====
Battered and deep fried slices of potato are a popular snack food in Australia, often as a part of Fish and chips. There is a noted regional variance in the name used, with Potato cake, Potato Scallop, & Potato Fritter depending on State.

==== New Zealand ====
Whitebait fritters are popular in New Zealand.

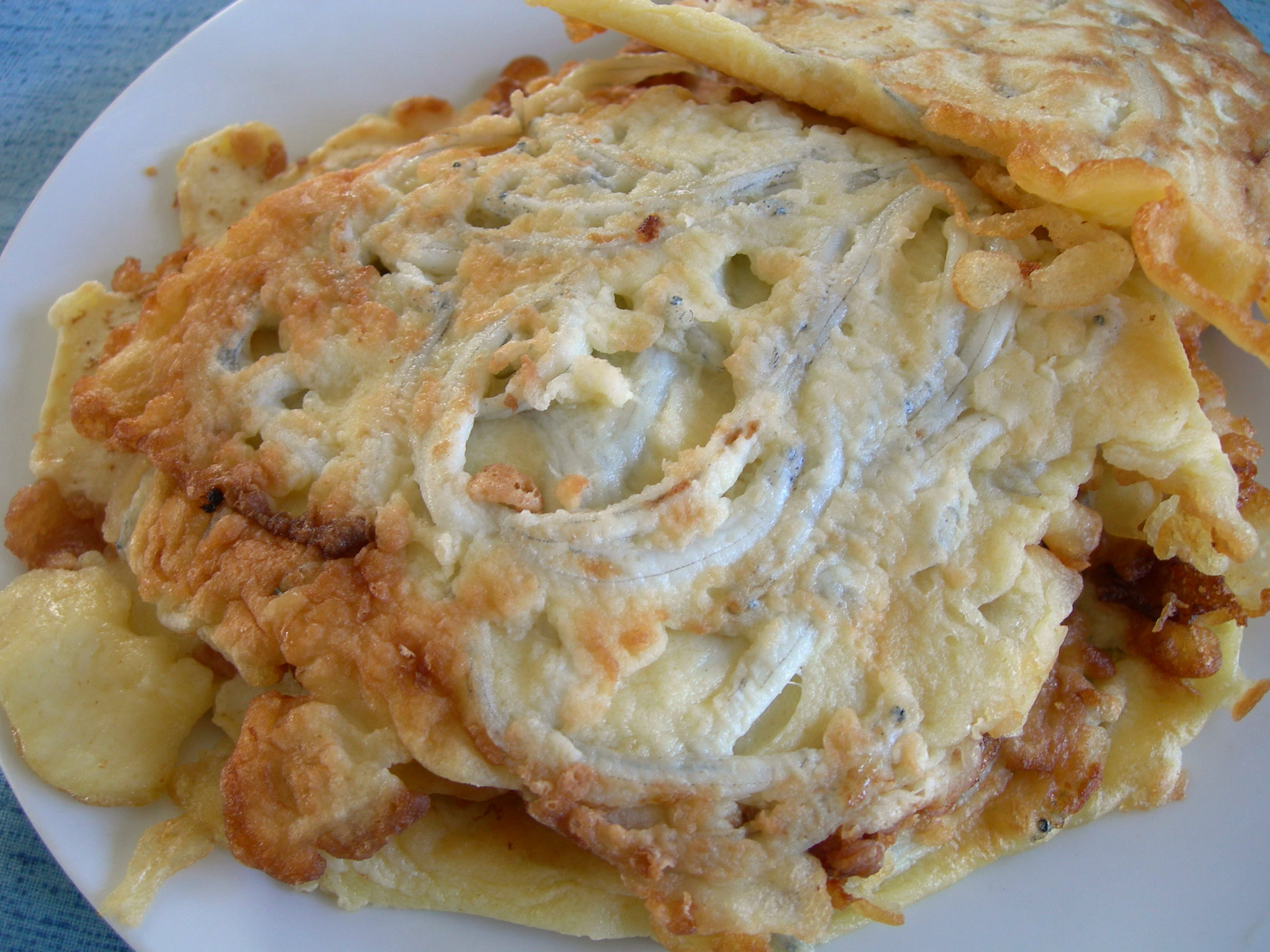
New Zealand whitebait fritters

=== Europe ===
==== Netherlands ====
An oliebol, literally 'oil ball', is a simple dough ball fried in oil. Varieties contain currants or raisins, the so-called 'krentenbol'. They are traditionally prepared or bought ready-made specifically to be consumed on New Year's Eve.

==== Portugal ====
Peixinhos da horta is a traditional dish in Portuguese cuisine. The name of the dish is literally translated as "little fish from the vegetable garden", as it resembles small pieces of colorful fish. Its preparation involves coating green beans, bell peppers, squash, or other vegetables in a wheat flour batter and deep-frying them. It was introduced to Japan by Portuguese sailors in the sixteenth century, where it eventually developed into tempura.

==== United Kingdom ====
In British fish and chip shops, the fish and chips can be accompanied by "fritters", which means a food item, such as a slice of potato, a pineapple ring, an apple ring or chunks, or mushy peas fried in batter. Hence: "potato fritter", "pineapple fritter", "apple fritter", "pea fritter", etc. At home and at school, fritters are also sometimes made with meat, especially Spam and corned beef. A fritter roll or roll and fritter is a potato fritter inside a bread roll, served with salt and vinegar.

==== Ukraine ====
Deruny are traditional Ukrainian potato pancakes made from grated raw potatoes, onion, flour, and egg, typically shallow-fried in oil..

Tsybulnyky' or tsibulyanyki – Ukrainian onion pancakes or fritters

=== North America ===
==== Canada and the United States ====
The apple fritter is a fried pastry popular within Canada and the United States. Early versions of apple fritters appear in Martha Washington's Booke of Cookery, a manuscript dating to the 18th century, which includes various fritter recipes common in colonial American kitchens. The apple fritter has also been documented as early as 1508, in The Boke of Keruynge, in which it is mentioned that they are "good hot". An apple fritter recipe typically includes a batter made from flour, sugar, baking powder, salt, milk, eggs, and a bit of oil. Fresh apples are peeled, cored, and chopped, then folded into the batter. The fritters are deep-fried in vegetable oil and, once golden, are coated in cinnamon-sugar for a sweet finish. In Canada, the apple fritter remains especially popular; Tim Hortons, a leading Canadian coffee and doughnut chain, reported that the apple fritter became their top-selling doughnut in 2023.

==== Caribbean ====
Conch fritters are commonly prepared in the Bahamas.

==== Mexico ====
Tortitas are golden-brown fritters made in Mexico from Mexican cuisine. One variant is the tortita de papa (potato fritter). This dish consists of boiled potato dough fried in oil. The first written recipes for tortitas can be found in Mexican cookbooks from the 19th century.

== See also ==
- Akara – Yoruba deep-fried been cake
- Acarajé – Deep-fried bean cake.
- Arancini – Italian snack food.
- Beignet – Deep-fried pastry.
- Boortsog – Traditional fried dough of Central Asian and Middle Eastern cuisines.
- Buñuelo – Fried dough ball.
- Banana fritter
- Carimañola – South American meat pie in a burrito-shaped yuca fritter.
- Crab cake – American crab dish.
- Croquette – Small breaded, deep-fried food.
- Cuchifritos – Various fried foods prepared principally of pork.
- Corn fritter
- Fishcake – Fried minced or ground seafood.
- Fried dough foods
- Kevum
- List of doughnut varieties
- List of bread dishes
- List of deep-fried foods
- Mandazi – Fried bread.
- Mücver – Turkish fritter or pancake, made from grated zucchini.
- Pakora – Spiced fritter originally from the Indian subcontinent.
- Pholourie – Fried, spiced dough balls.
- Potato pancake – Shallow-fried pancakes of grated or ground potato.
- Vada – Category of savoury fried snacks from India.
- Zalabiyeh – Deep-fried pastry common to West Asia and Indian subcontinent.
