= Tsybulnyky =

Ukrainian onion pancakes

Цибульники
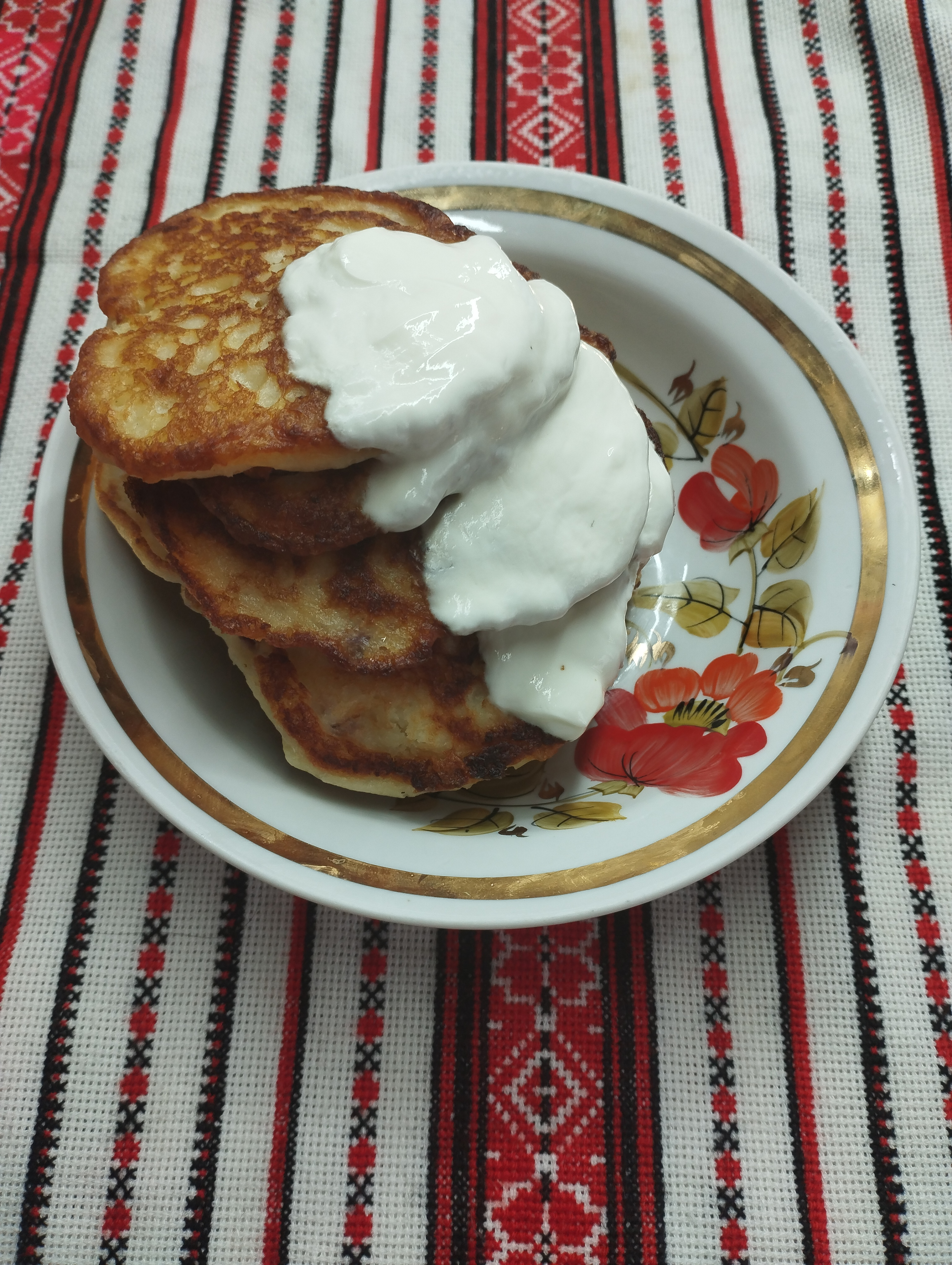
- Type: Pancakes, fritters
- Place of origin: Ukraine
- Region or state: Western Ukraine
- Serving temperature: Hot
- Main ingredients: Flour, eggs, onion, oil, salt

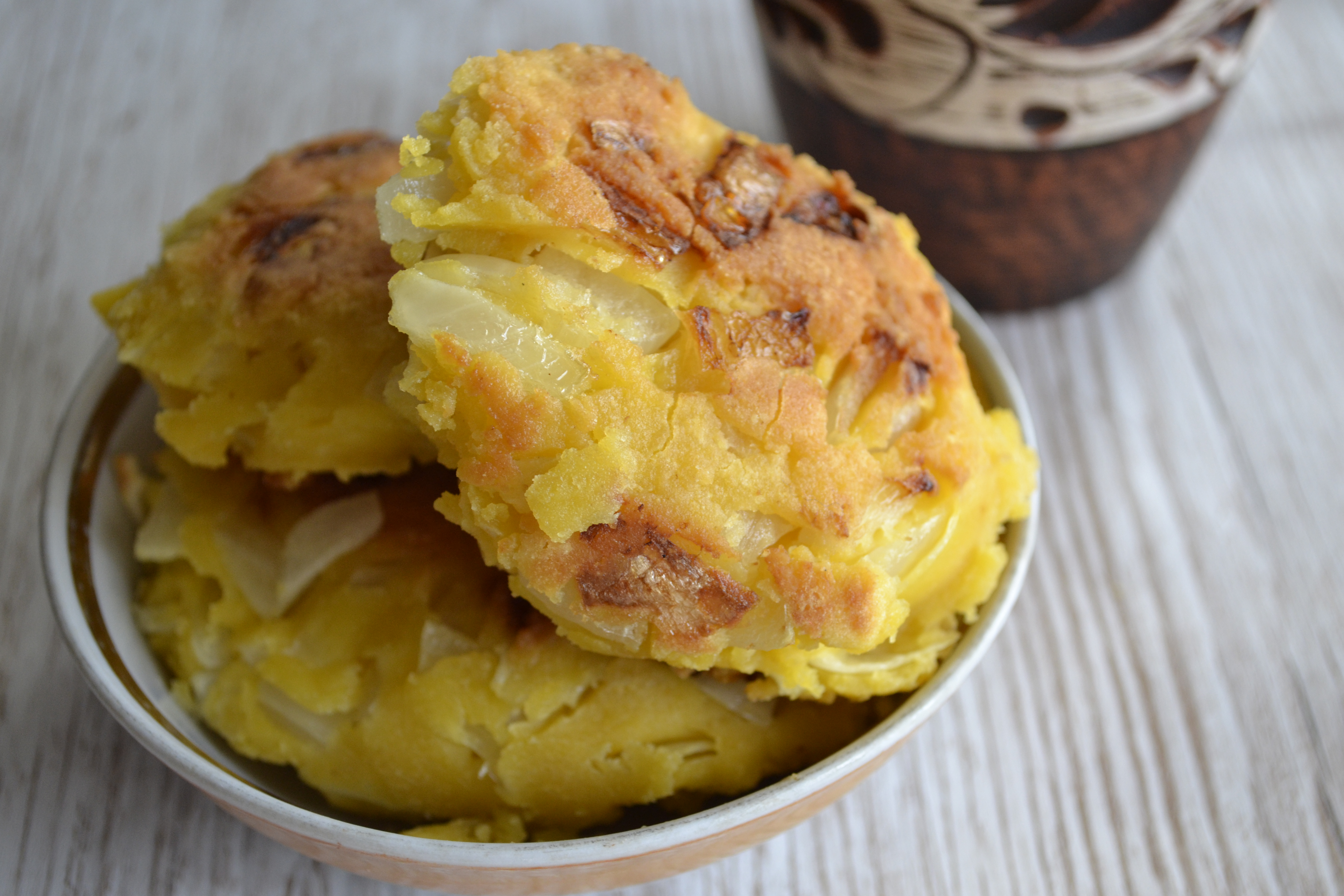

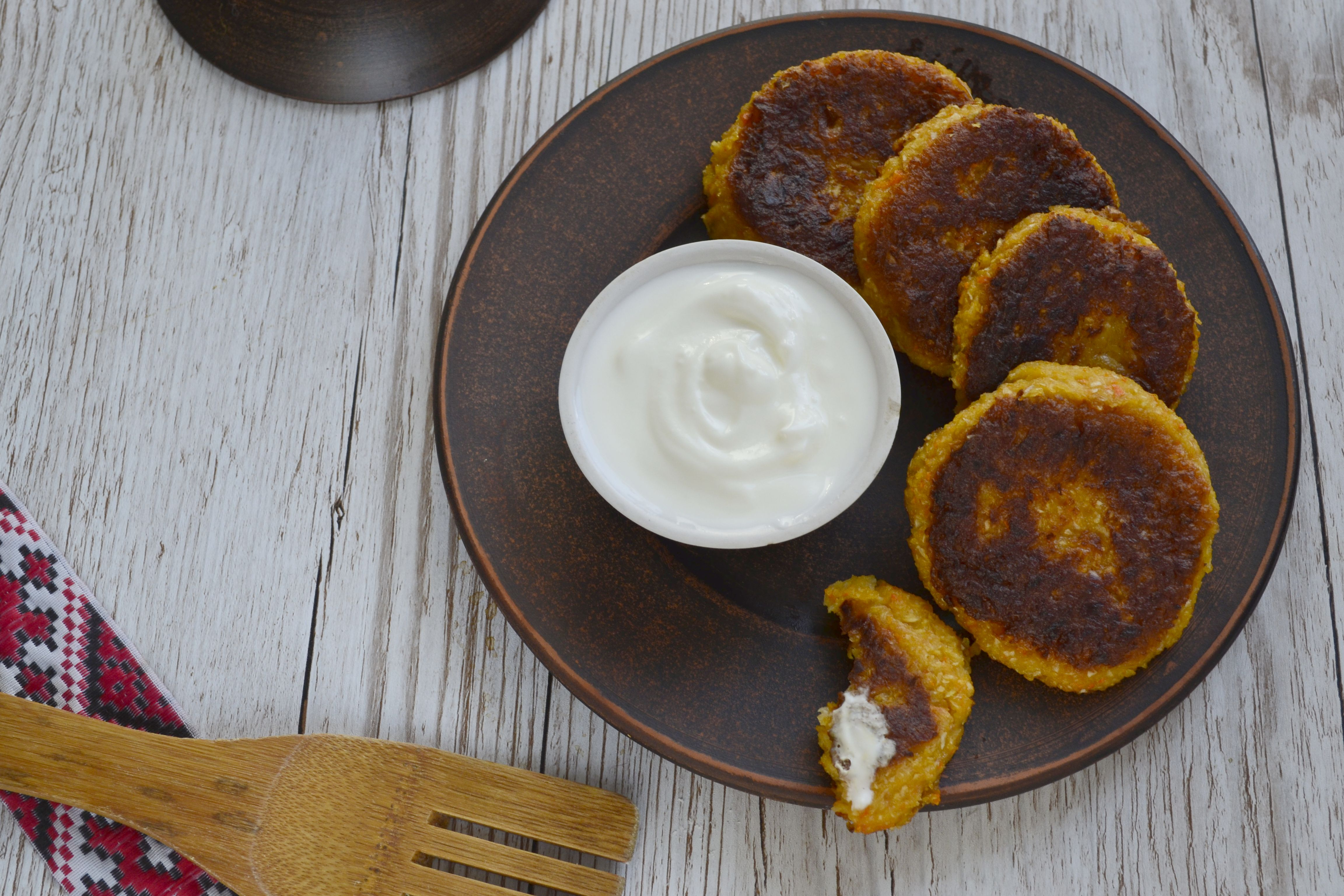
Tsybulnyky

Tsybulnyky or tsibulyanyki (from ukrainian "tsybulya", onion) – Ukrainian onion pancakes or fritters. They are especially popular in western Ukraine, particularly in Lviv.

== History ==
There is a legend about how this dish appeared. Once the Tatars laid siege to Lviv and sent parliamentarians to negotiate the surrender of the city. They refused the invaders and showed them large food reserves. The Tatars believed them and lifted the siege. But in reality, in order to outwit the invaders and portray abundance, the residents drove all the livestock to the gate, put empty barrels on the carts, and piled leftover food on top. Meanwhile, women in starving Lviv fed the city's defenders almost exclusively with onions. In particular, onion pancakes.

Tsybulnyky from Rachyn became an part of the gastronomic heritage of the Tarakaniv community, located in the Rivne region.

== Preparation ==
Onion fritters are made from grated or finely chopped onions, wheat flour, eggs and salt. The resulting mass is mixed and fried in a frying pan with oil. Onion fritters are traditionally served hot with sour cream, often with borscht or as a separate dish.
