= Tomato fritter =

Deep-fried tomato balls

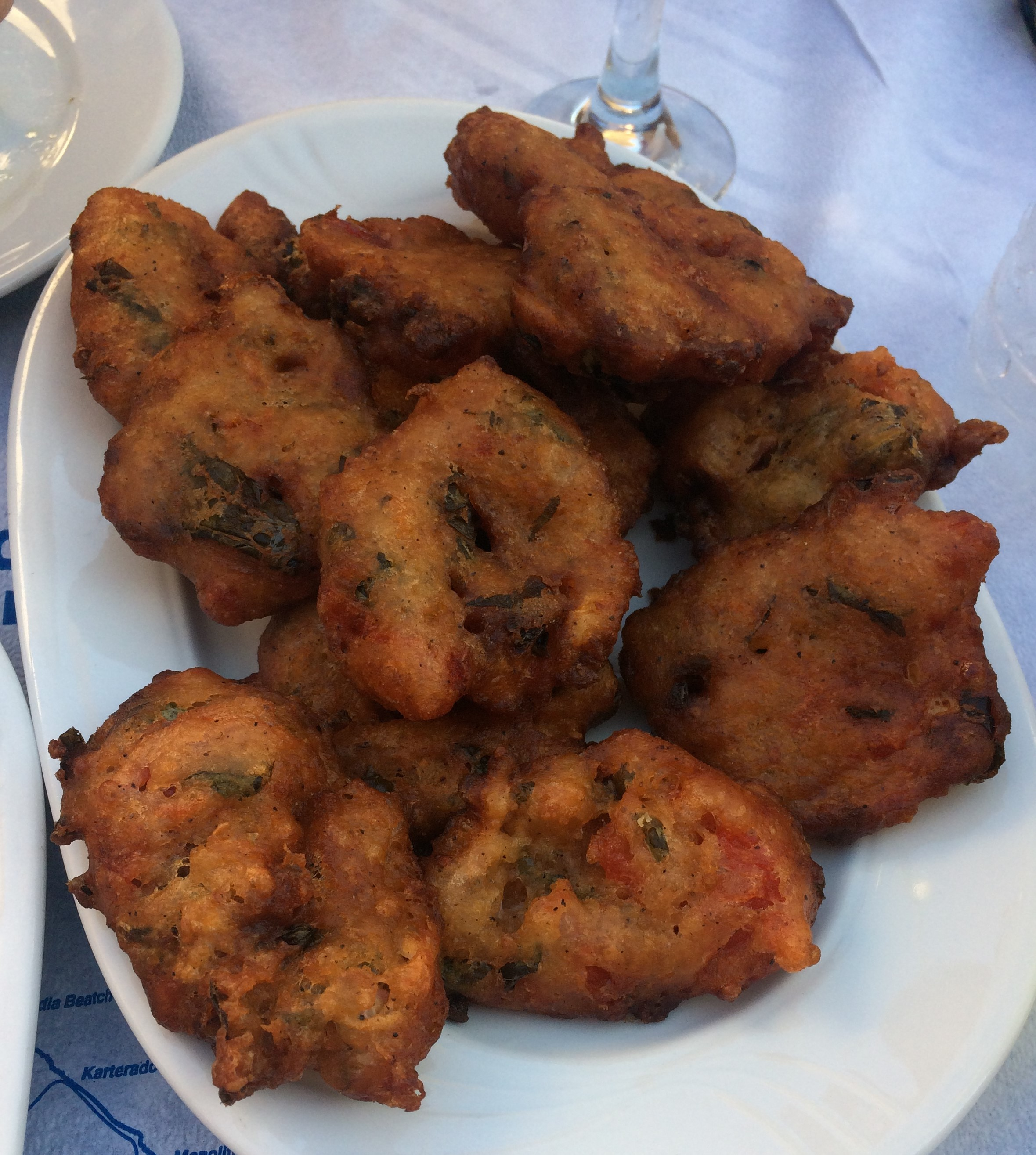
- Tomato fritters from Santorini, Greece
- Alternative names: Tomatokeftedes, domates mücveri, frittelle di pomodori
- Type: Fritter
- Region or state: Mediterranean
- Main ingredients: Tomato, flour
- Ingredients generally used: Herbs (mint or parsley), onion, egg, breadcrumbs, cheese

Tomato fritter is a fritter primarily made from tomato. It is a meze (appetizer) or side dish in the Mediterranean cuisine, precisely in Greece, Turkey, and Italy.

== History ==
One of the earliest recipe for tomato fritters appears in the 19th-century Ottoman cookbook Fenn-i Tabâhat, titled salçalı ve domatesli mücver. The preparation involves mixing peeled, seeded, and finely chopped tomatoes with eggs, breadcrumbs, salt, and pepper, frying the mixture on both sides with oil, and drizzling with garlic-infused tomato paste once finished.

== Variants ==
=== Greece ===
Tomatokeftedes (Greek: ντοματοκεφτέδες) are traditional Greek tomato fritters associated with Santorini and the Cyclades. They are typically made from finely chopped and/or grated tomatoes combined with onion (and sometimes scallion), feta cheese, herbs and spices of choice, such as mint, parsley, basil, dried oregano, paprika, and flour and/or breadcrumbs, salt, pepper, and sometimes an egg, lemon, and vinegar, then spooned into hot cooking oil and fried. They may be served with yogurt and finished with paprika and mint.

=== Turkey ===
Domates mücveri is a tomato-based preparation within the broader mücver tradition of vegetable fritters. Traditionally, Turkish tomato fritters involved mixing peeled, seeded, and finely chopped tomatoes with eggs, breadcrumbs, and salt, as attested in the 19th-century Ottoman cookbooks. Modern recipes vary considerably but generally contain tomatoes mixed with onions, herbs and spices of choice, such as dried mint, parsley, dill, black pepper, red pepper flakes, cheddar cheese, an egg, flour, egg, breadcrumbs, or cheese.

=== Italy ===
Frittelle di pomodori are another tomato-based fried preparation. Recipes vary, with tomatoes being combined with ingredients such as flour, egg, or breadcrumbs before being fried.
