= Mücver =

Turkish fritter or pancake, made from grated zucchini

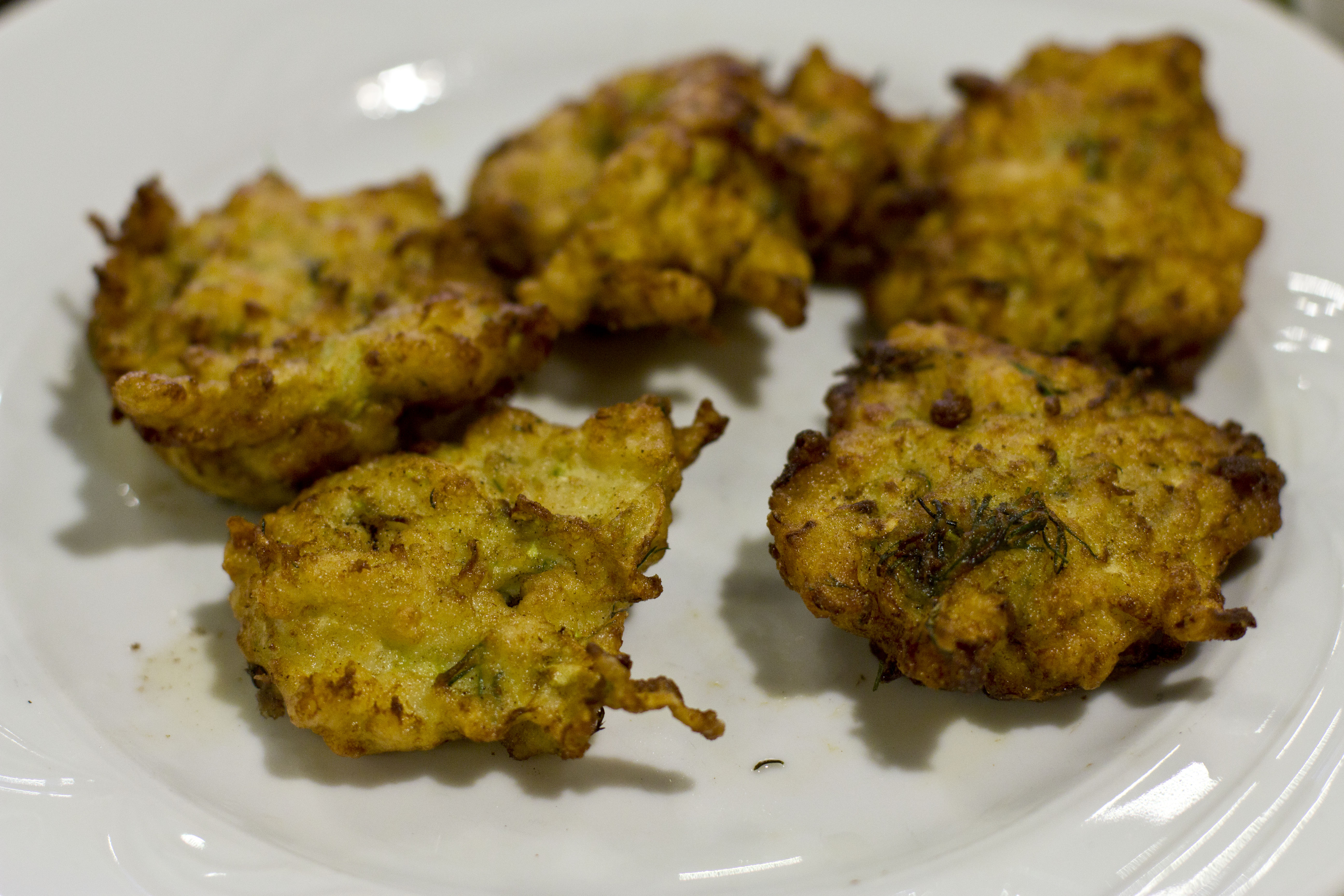
- Alternative names: Mucver
- Type: Pancake
- Serving temperature: Hot
- Main ingredients: Grated zucchini (courgette) or potatoes, egg, onion, dill and cheese and flour.

Mücver is a Turkish fritter or pancake, made from grated zucchini (courgette). They are typically pan-fried in oil and their batter often includes a mixture of eggs, onion, dill, parsley, flour, and sometimes potatoes and cheese (beyaz peynir or kaşar). They are similar to Jewish latkes and potato pancakes from various cultures.

== History ==
Though mücver is currently known as a vegetable patty made with zucchini, in the Ottoman cuisine, it used to be known as a cooking technique. Written as mücmer in Ottoman records, it transformed into mücver in modern Turkish.

== See also ==
- List of fried dough foods
- Latke – Jewish potato pancake dish
- Vada – Category of savoury fried snacks from India
- Potato pancake – Shallow-fried pancakes of grated or ground potato
- Domates mücveri – Turkish appetizer
