= Ojojo =

Yoruba yam fritters

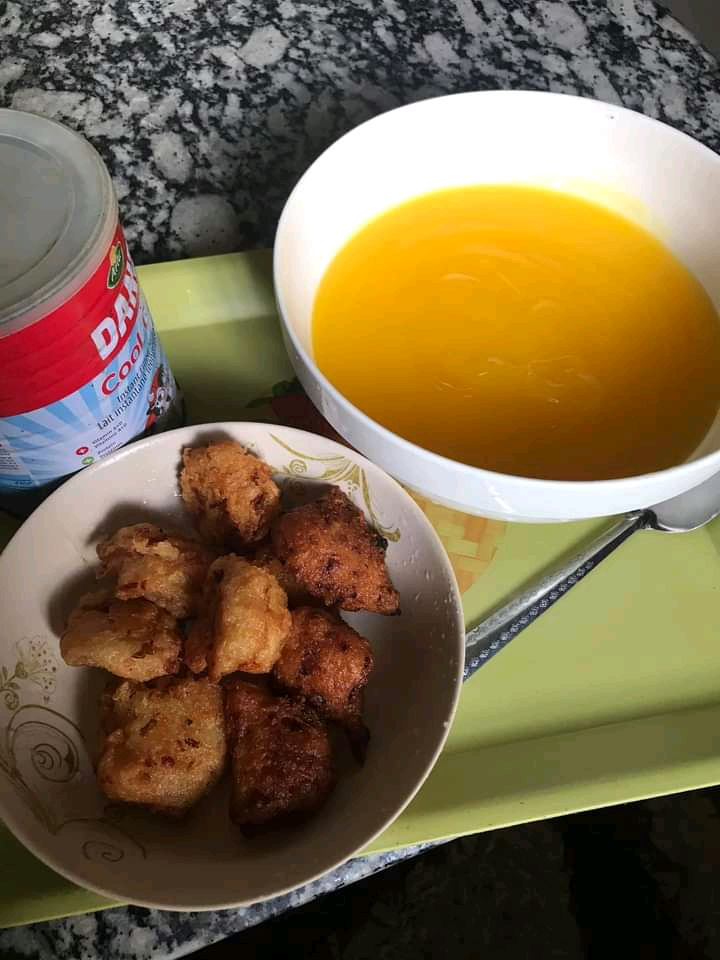
Ojojo

Ojojo is a savory Yoruba fried snack that is made from water yams (Isu Ewura).It is common among the Ijebu. Ojojo has health benefits. Water yams are a type of yams with higher water content. They are grated to make the batter for ojojo. In the batter, pepper, crayfish powder, garlic, onion, bullion cube and other spices are added. No water is added. Dried shredded fish can also be added to the ojojo batter. It is deep fried in oil and has a round shape. Ojojo can be eaten with Akara and Eko or Akamu. It can also be eaten with Garri, custard, hot pap (Ogi) or oatmeal.
