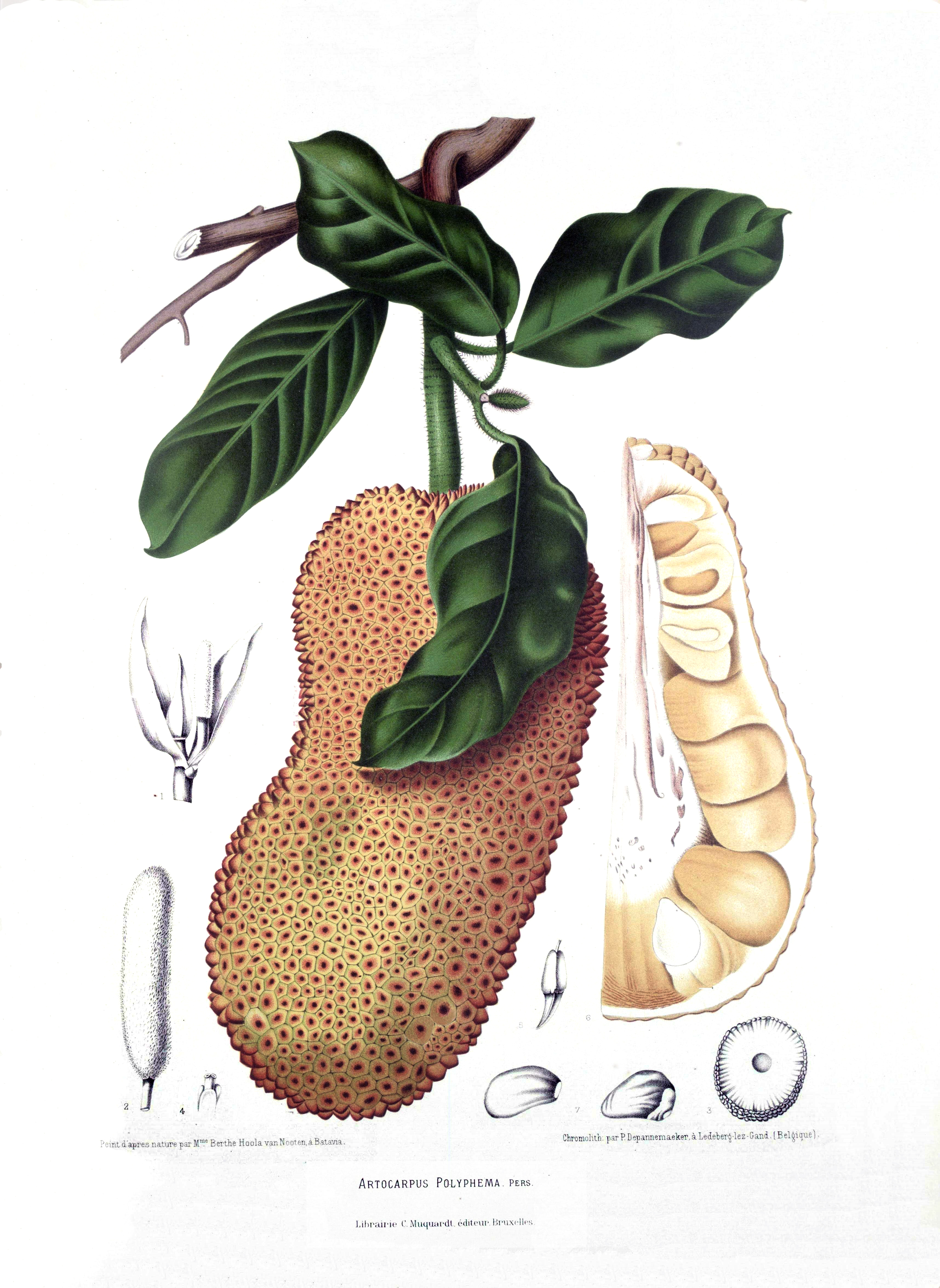

Conservation status
- Least Concern (IUCN 3.1)

Scientific classification
- Kingdom: Plantae
- Clade: Embryophytes
- Clade: Tracheophytes
- Clade: Angiosperms
- Clade: Eudicots
- Clade: Rosids
- Order: Rosales
- Family: Moraceae
- Genus: Artocarpus
- Species: A. integer

Binomial name
- Artocarpus integer (Thunb.) Merr.

Varieties
- Artocarpus integer var. integer; Artocarpus integer var. silvestris Corner

Synonyms
- Artocarpus integrifolius L.f., nom. illeg. superfl.; Artocarpus integrifolius var. hirsutus Stokes, not validly publ.; Radermachia integra Thunb.; Sitodium cauliflorum Gaertn., nom. illeg. superfl.; Sitodium macrocarpon Thunb., nom. illeg. superfl.; Saccus integer (Thunb.) Kuntze; synonyms of var. integer: Artocarpus champeden (Lour.) Stokes; Artocarpus hirsutissimus Kurz; Artocarpus jaca Miq.; Artocarpus pilosus Reinw. ex Miq.; Artocarpus polyphemus Pers., nom. illeg. homonym. post.; Polyphema champeden Lour.; Saccus champeden (Lour.) Kuntze

= Artocarpus integer =

Chempedak

Asian tree related to breadfruit and jackfruit

Artocarpus integer, called chempedak or cempedak, is a species of tree in the family Moraceae, in the same genus as breadfruit and jackfruit. It is native to Southeast Asia, ranging from Peninsular Malaysia and Peninsular Thailand to Sumatra, Borneo, Java, Sulawesi, and the Maluku Islands. Cempedak is an important crop in Malaysia and is also popularly cultivated in southern Thailand and parts of Indonesia, and has the potential to be utilized in other areas. It is currently limited in range to Southeast Asia, with some trees in Australia and Hawaii.

The species was first described as Radermachia integra by Carl Peter Thunberg in 1776. In 1917 Elmer Drew Merrill placed the species in genus Artocarpus as A. integer. Two varieties are accepted:

- Artocarpus integer var. integer – Peninsular Thailand, Peninsular Malaysia, Sumatra, Java, Borneo, Sulawesi, and the Maluku Islands
- Artocarpus integer var. silvestris Corner – Peninsular Malaysia and Peninsular Thailand

== Description ==
Cempedak trees are large, evergreen trees. They can grow to a height of 20 m, although most reach only a dozen meters. The trees are monoecious, with male and female flowers growing on the same tree. There are many varieties, although few are named. The vigorously growing tree can bear heavy crops of fruit once or twice a year.

=== Fruit ===
The syncarp may be cylindrical to spherical in shape, and ranges from 10 to 15 cm across and 20 to 35 cm in length. The thin and leathery skin is greenish, yellowish to brownish in color, and patterned with pentagons that are either raised protuberances or flat eye facets.

Fleshy, edible arils surround the large seeds in a thick layer. The arils are edible raw, or they can be prepared in a number of ways. They are yellowish-white to orange in color, sweet and fragrant, soft, slippery and slimy on the tongue and slightly fibrous. Ripe cempedak fruit has a pungent smell that has been described as harsh and penetrating like that of durian. The taste of the fruit is similar to the related jackfruit and breadfruit with a hint of durian. The seeds, which are also edible, are flattened spheres or elongated, about 2–3 cm in length.

Cempedak is similar to jackfruit in many ways, but is smaller than jackfruit and the peduncle is thinner. The male inflorescence of cempedak is pale green to yellow compared to the dark green of jackfruit. The cempedak flesh is darker yellow and juicier when ripe.

== Habitat and ecology ==
Artocarpus integer grows in evergreen tropical rain forests from sea level to 1,500 m (4,900 ft) elevation, and is common in logged forests.

== Cultivation ==
=== Conditions ===
Cempedak trees are normally planted in non-eroded and well-drained soils, although they can tolerate temporary flooding, from sea level up to 1,200 m (3,900 ft) elevation, at temperatures between 13–47 °C (55–117 °F) and with annual rainfall of 1,250–2,500 mm (49–98 in).

=== Propagation ===
In the Malay Archipelago, cempedak is usually cultivated with other fruit trees in mixed orchard systems of small farmers and occasionally in large fruit plantations. The trees are normally propagated by bud-grafting to maintain desired genetic traits. Plants are also propagated by seed, but the seeds spoil quickly after removal from the fruit, so they must be planted immediately after cleaning.

=== Flowering and fruit ===
Trees begin to bear fruit at 3–6 years for trees planted by seed and at 2–4 years for clonal trees. Blossoms are common from February to April and then again in August to October in southern Malaysia, as opposed to in western Java, where cempedak tend to flower in July and August. From flowering to ripening fruit takes about 2–4 months.

=== Harvest ===
The timing of harvest is critical in assuring fruit quality. One of the most reliable ways to determine the maturity of cempedak is to tap the fruit and listen for a dull hollow sound. Skin color can also be an indicator of maturity, as ripened skins turn from green to a yellower color. The development of a characteristic odor similar to that of durian can also mark maturity of the fruit, in addition to the spines of the fruits' skin becoming flattened. Fruit are harvested ideally before falling to avoid damage, loss of shelf life and premature ripening. The harvested fruit produces a latex exudate, and is left to drain in the field before being moved from the orchard. The fruit has a short shelf life of 2–3 days.

== Uses ==
Cempedak is sought after for its edible, pulpy flesh that is typically yellow/orange and rich in beta-carotene. It has a sweet flavor akin to that of durian and mango.

The fruit is normally consumed in the areas where it is cultivated and can be eaten fresh or cooked. The large fruit are often cut open and sliced into pieces for sale. The seeds can be fried, boiled or grilled, then peeled and eaten with salt. The taste of the seeds is similar to water chestnuts. The young fruit, like young jackfruit, can be used as a vegetable. In this case, the young fruit is peeled, sliced and boiled, then sometimes seasoned or added as an ingredient to other foods, such as curries. In South and East Kalimantan, Indonesia, people historically consume cempedak's lactic acid bacteria-fermented inner skin, traditionally termed dami or mandai. The skin can be processed by peeling the fruit until it looks white, then fermenting the inner skin. Mandai is usually consumed after frying.

The wood is of good quality, strong and durable, and used as building material for home furnishings or boats. The fibrous bark can be used to make ropes. Yellow dye can also be produced from the wood.

== Gallery ==
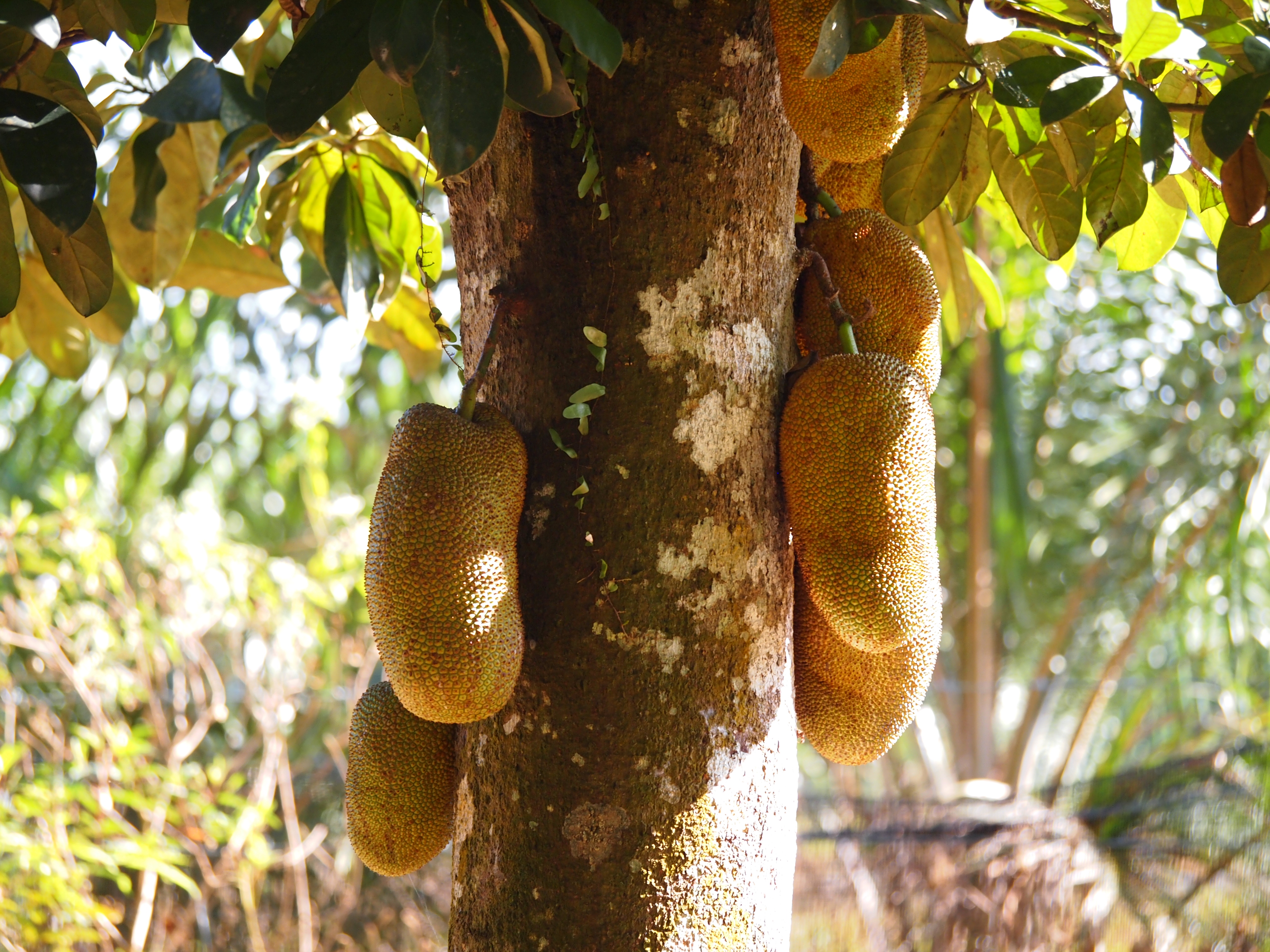
Mature fruit on tree

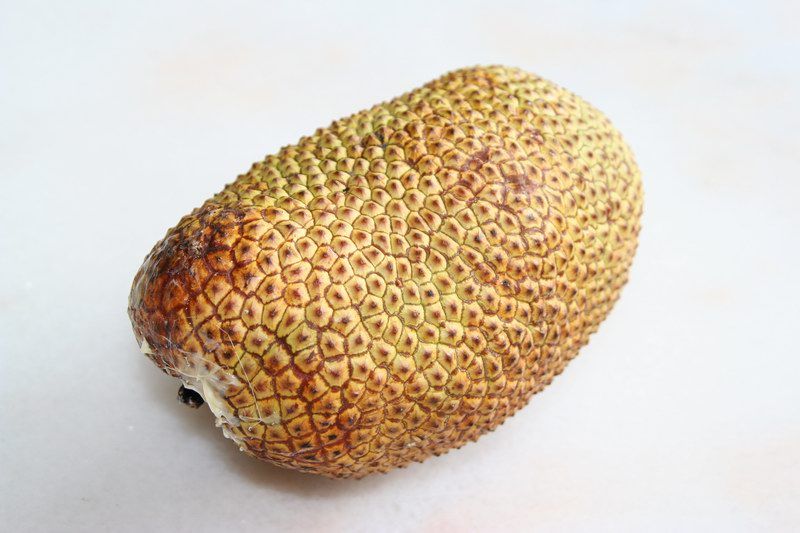
Whole fruit

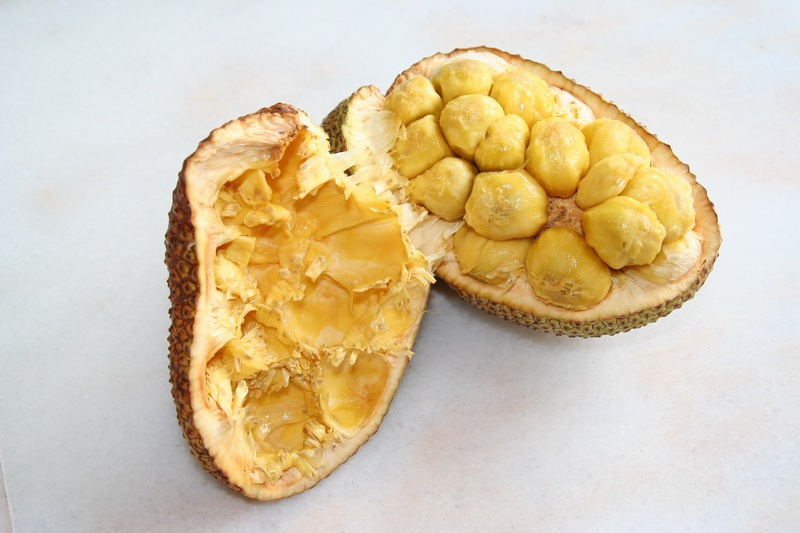
Fruit cut open

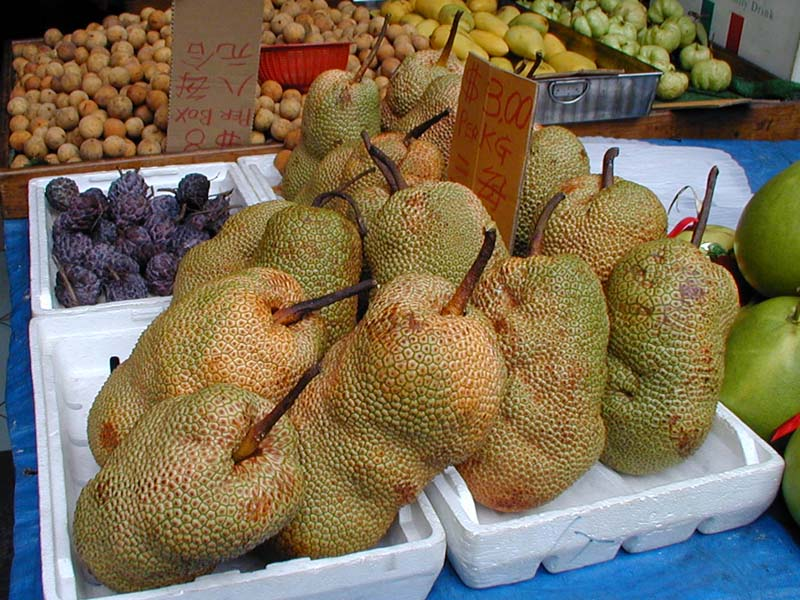
For sale in Chinese market

== See also ==
- Domesticated plants and animals of Austronesia
- List of fruits
