= Mendoan =

Indonesian fritter made of tempeh

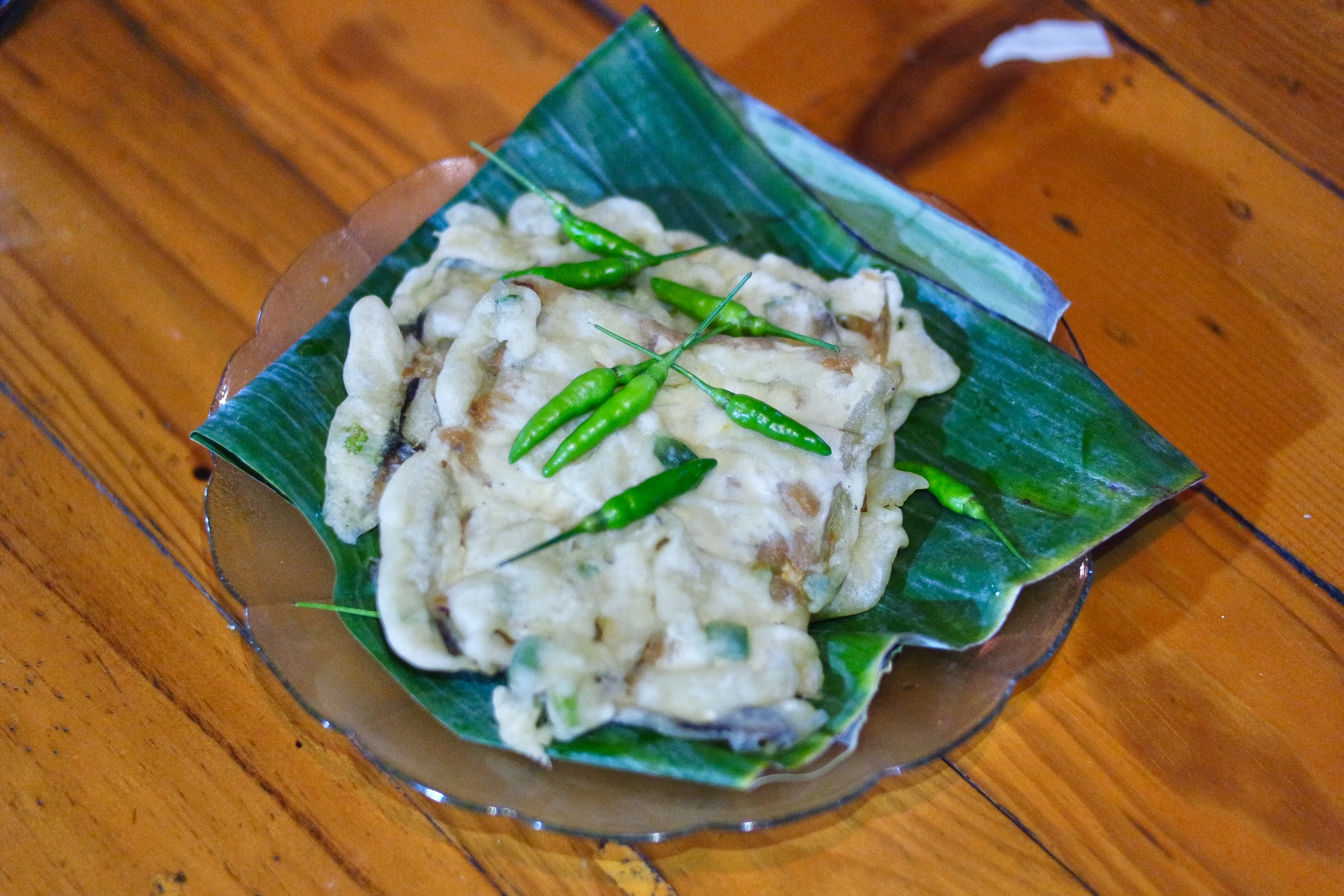
- Mendoan Banyumas
- Type: Food
- Place of origin: Indonesia
- Region or state: Banyumas, Central Java
- Main ingredients: Tempeh, Tofu

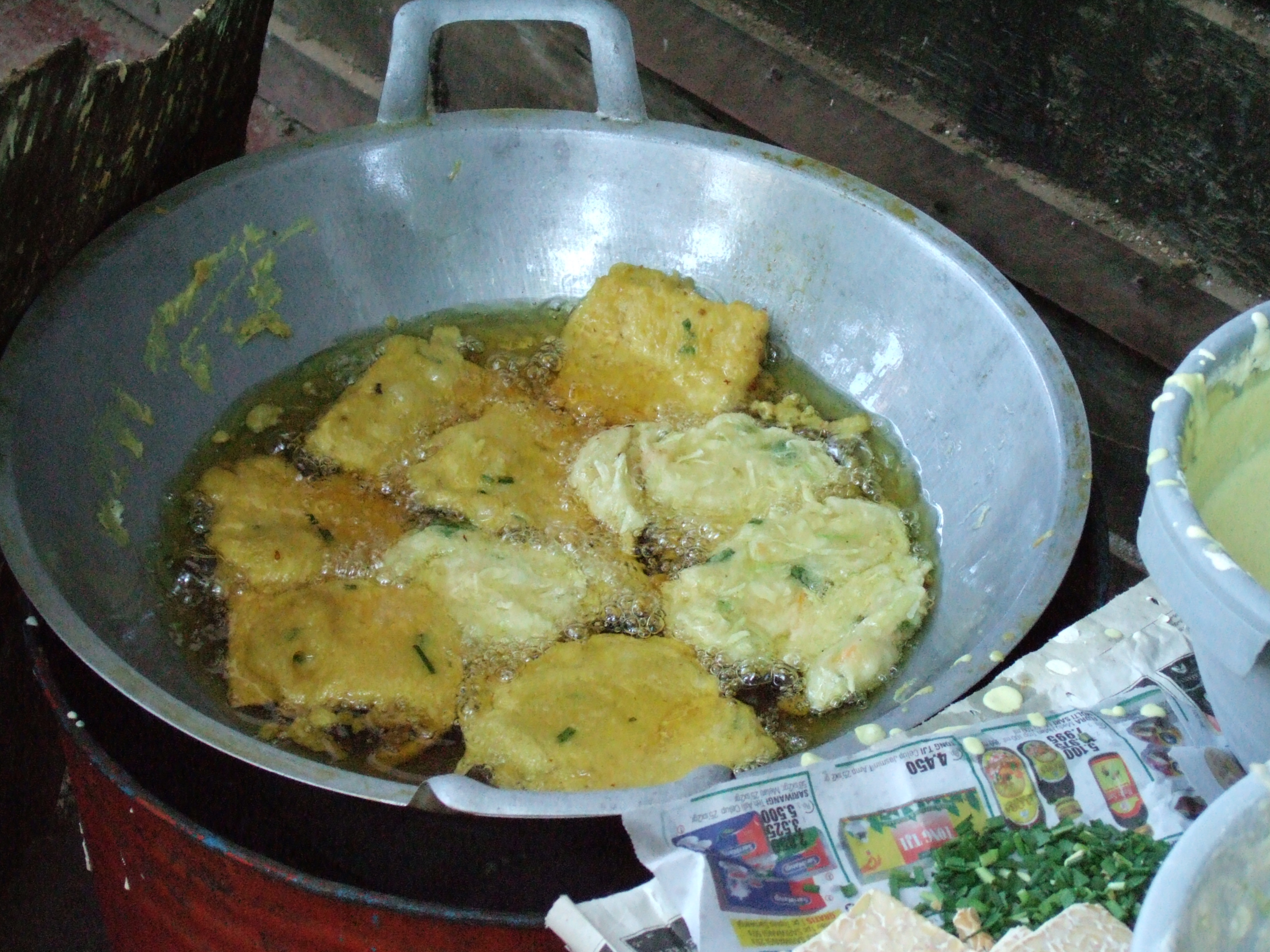
Frying

Mendoan is a type of fried food that comes from the residency of Banyumas, Central Java, Indonesia. The word mendoan comes from the Banyumasan language word Mendo which means half-cooked or mushy; mendoan means cooking with much hot oil quickly so the cooking is not properly completed. Mendoan is often made of tempeh and tofu.

== See also ==
- Javanese cuisine
