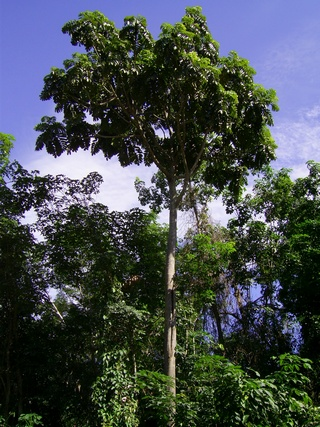
- Entawak in East Kalimantan, Indonesia

Conservation status
- Vulnerable (IUCN 3.1)

Scientific classification
- Kingdom: Plantae
- Clade: Tracheophytes
- Clade: Angiosperms
- Clade: Eudicots
- Clade: Rosids
- Order: Rosales
- Family: Moraceae
- Genus: Artocarpus
- Species: A. anisophyllus

Binomial name
- Artocarpus anisophyllus Miq.

Synonyms
- A. klidang Boerl. (1900); A. superbus Becc. (1902)

= Artocarpus anisophyllus =

Entawak

Species of tree

Artocarpus anisophyllus, the entawak or mentawa, is a tropical tree in the Moraceae. It is native to the central parts of Southeast Asia, and is present in Peninsular Malaysia, Sumatra, Borneo and the intervening islands. It is called popwan in Palawan, Philippines.

Rarely cultivated in its native range, it is a large rainforest tree growing up to 45 m (148 ft). It bears round, 3–4 in (76–102 mm) long, brownish yellow fruit. The entawak's flesh is orange-red and may taste like a pumpkin in flavor, while it also has edible seeds which are commonly roasted and salted to be eaten. The fruit is eaten fresh. It is a distant relative to the well known jackfruit and breadfruit, and the genus Artocarpus comprises several other species known for their tasty fruits, such as tarap. It is propagated by seeds, grafting and cuttings besides other viable methods. While it grows exceedingly well in tropical climates, it is not as well-adapted to subtropical climates. When grown from seed the germination may take 1–3 months and it will probably bear fruit within 8–9 years. It cannot survive temperatures below 50 °F (10 °C) and requires temperatures higher than 70 °F (21 °C) to flourish.

== Gallery ==
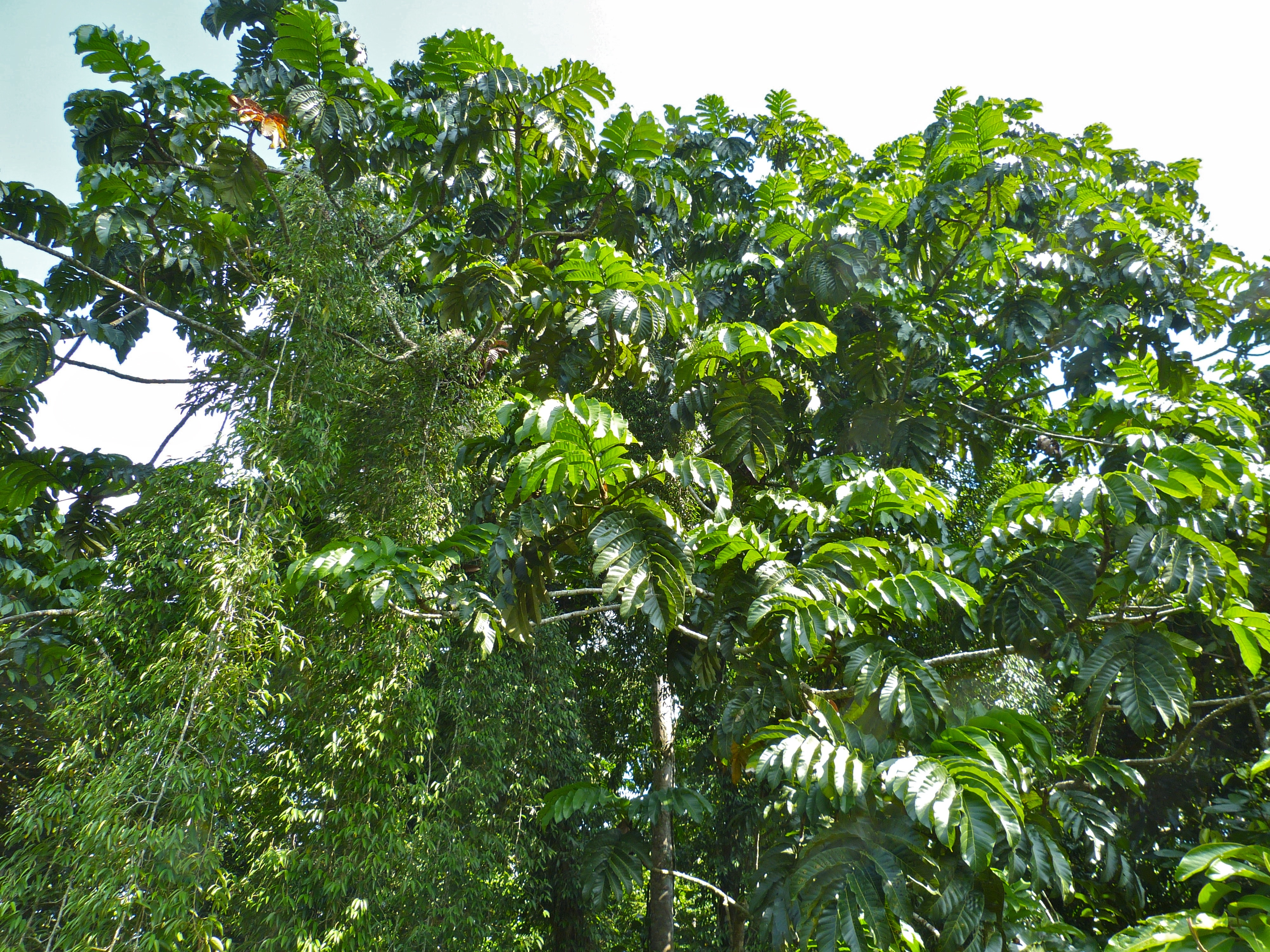
Foliage

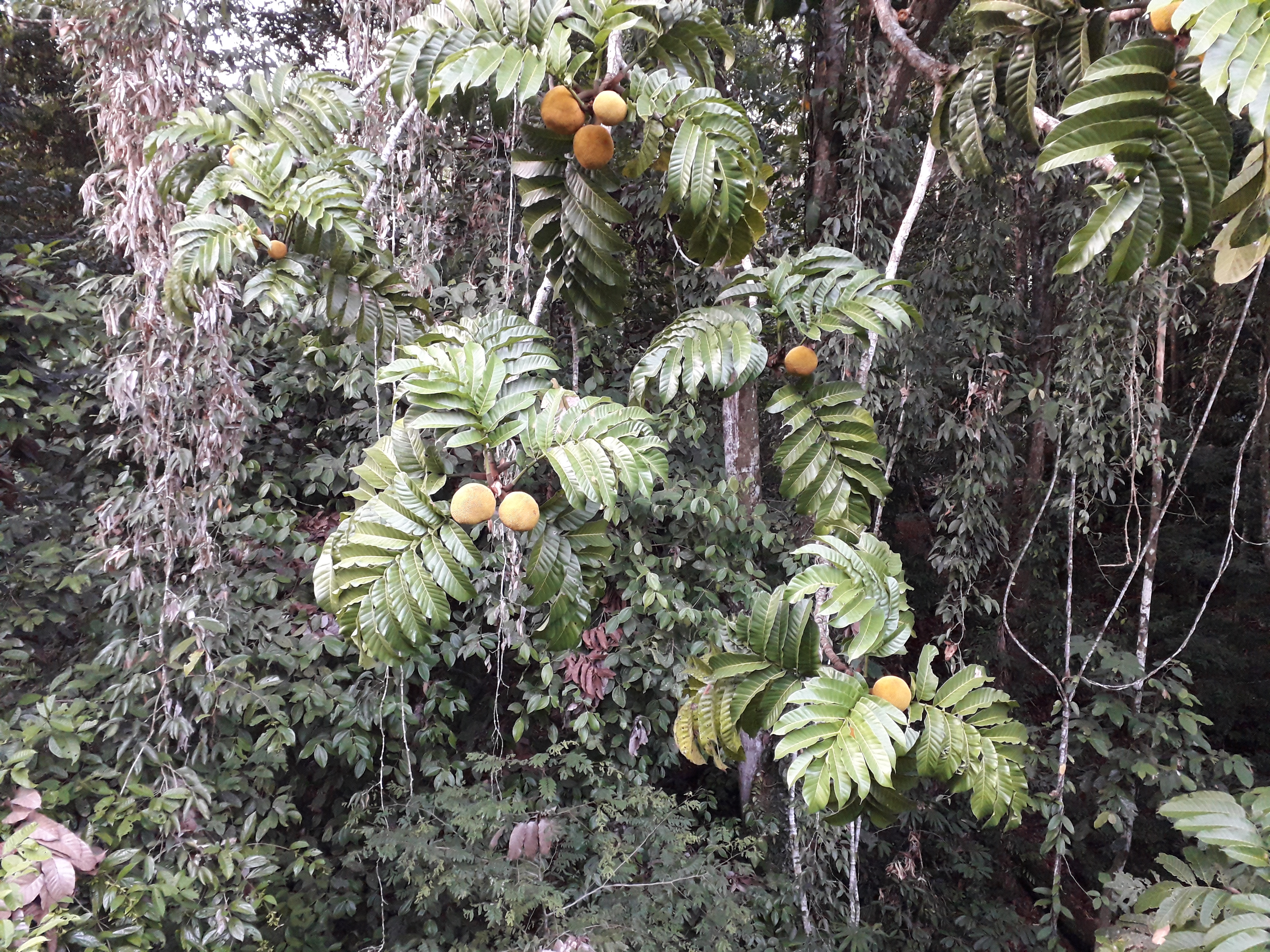
Foliage and fruit

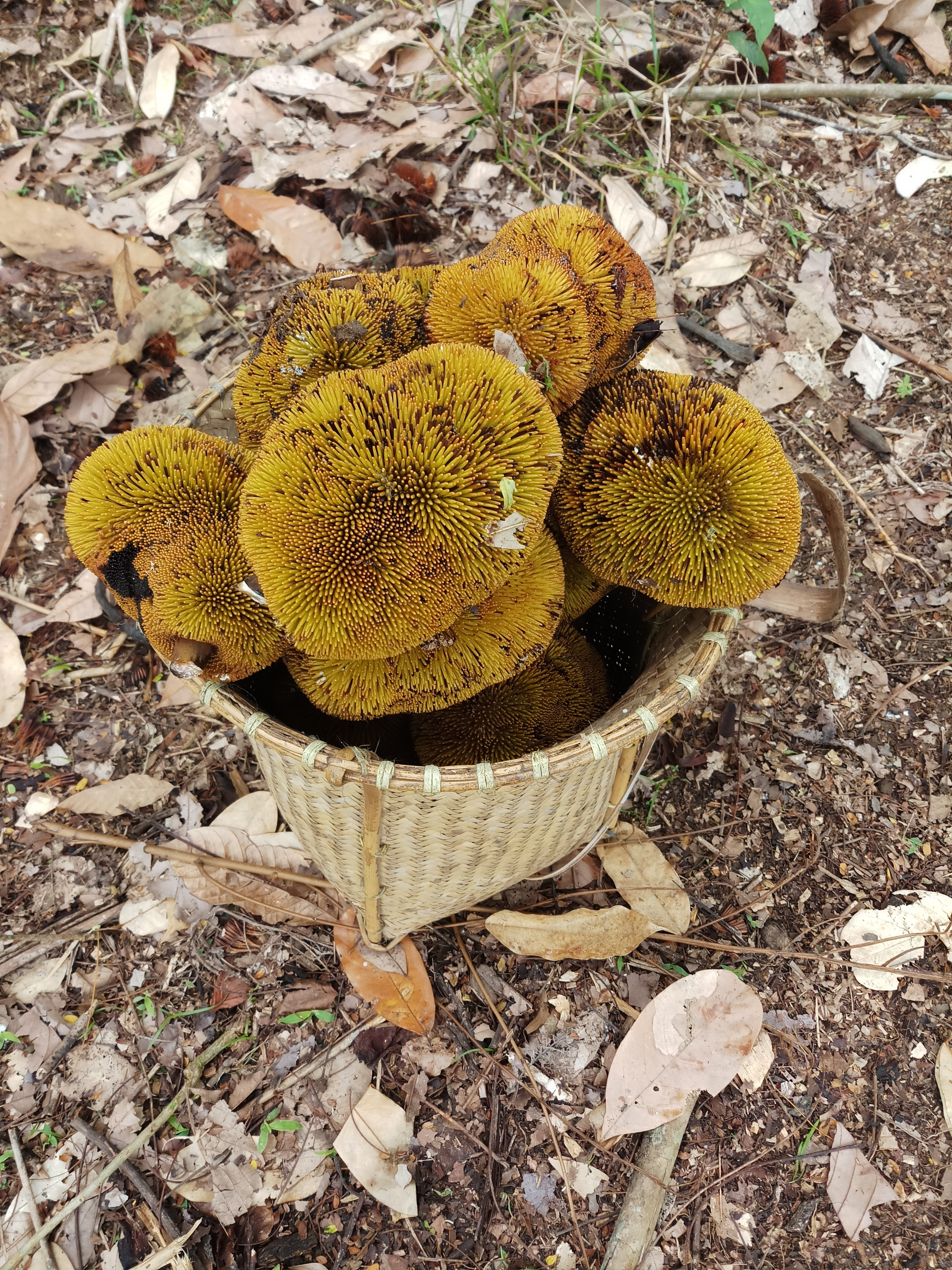
Collected fruit

== See also ==
- Domesticated plants and animals of Austronesia
