= Monkey jack =

Monkey jack can refer to:

- A mechanical jack
- Monkey jack fruit or its tree: Artocarpus lacucha or Artocarpus rigidus
