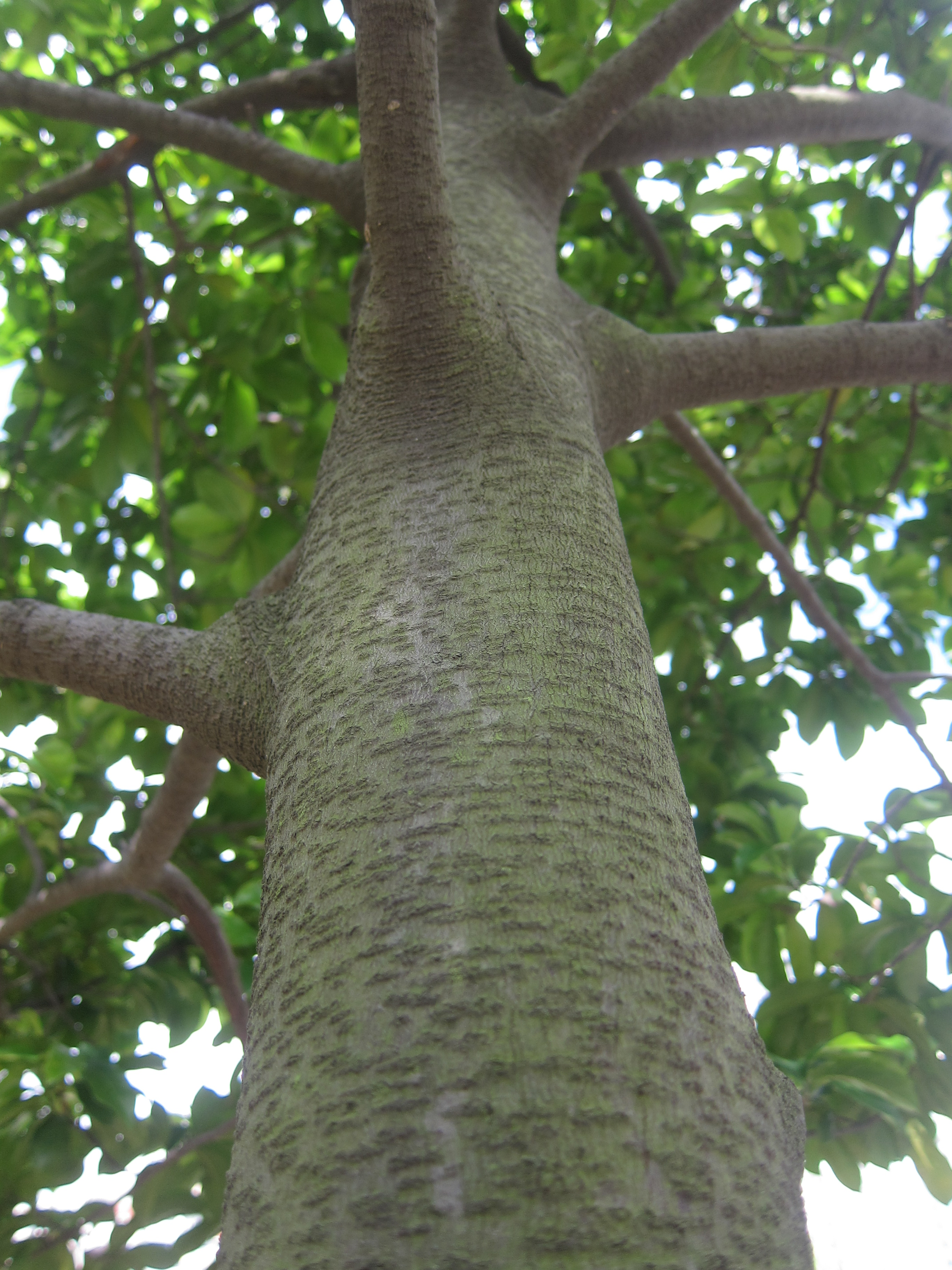

Conservation status
- Near Threatened (IUCN 3.1)

Scientific classification
- Kingdom: Plantae
- Clade: Tracheophytes
- Clade: Angiosperms
- Clade: Eudicots
- Clade: Rosids
- Order: Rosales
- Family: Moraceae
- Genus: Artocarpus
- Subgenus: A. subg. Pseudojaca
- Species: A. lamellosus

Binomial name
- Artocarpus lamellosus Blanco

Synonyms
- Artocarpus lanceolatus Trécul; Artocarpus nitidus Trécul; Saccus lanceolatus (Trécul) Kuntze; Saccus nitidus (Trécul) Kuntze

= Artocarpus lamellosus =

Species of flowering plant

Artocarpus lamellosus is a tree species in the family Moraceae. It is a wild species of the breadfruit/jackfruit genus (Artocarpus) which is endemic to the Philippines. It may be referred to as the butong in Tagalog and its Vietnamese name is mít nhỏ (also chay rừng which may be used for other forest species of Artocarpus).

== Formerly placed here ==
The following subspecies of A. nitidus have been elevated to species of their own:

- A. nitidus subsp. borneensis (→Artocarpus borneensis)
- A. nitidus subsp. griffithii (→Artocarpus griffithii)
- A. nitidus subsp. humilis (→Artocarpus humilis)
- A. nitidus subsp. lingnanensis (→Artocarpus parvus)
