= Artocarpus horridus =

Scientific classification
- Kingdom: Plantae
- Clade: Tracheophytes
- Clade: Angiosperms
- Clade: Eudicots
- Clade: Rosids
- Order: Rosales
- Family: Moraceae
- Genus: Artocarpus
- Species: A. horridus

Binomial name
- Artocarpus horridus F.M.Jarrett

Species of flowering plant

Artocarpus horridus is a species of flowering plant in the genus Artocarpus. It is native to the Maluku island chain in indonesia.

== Description ==
Artocarpus horridus grows in wet, tropical biomes. It is considered Threatened.
