= Artocarpus rubrovenius =

Conservation status
- Least Concern (IUCN 3.1)

Scientific classification
- Kingdom: Plantae
- Clade: Embryophytes
- Clade: Tracheophytes
- Clade: Angiosperms
- Clade: Eudicots
- Clade: Rosids
- Order: Rosales
- Family: Moraceae
- Genus: Artocarpus
- Species: A. rubrovenius

Binomial name
- Artocarpus rubrovenius Warb.

Synonyms
- Artocarpus rubrovenia; Artocarpus rubrovenus

Species of flowering plant

Artocarpus rubrovenius is a species of flowering plant in the family Moraceae. It is a tree endemic to the Philippines. It is threatened by habitat loss. The species was first described in 1904.
