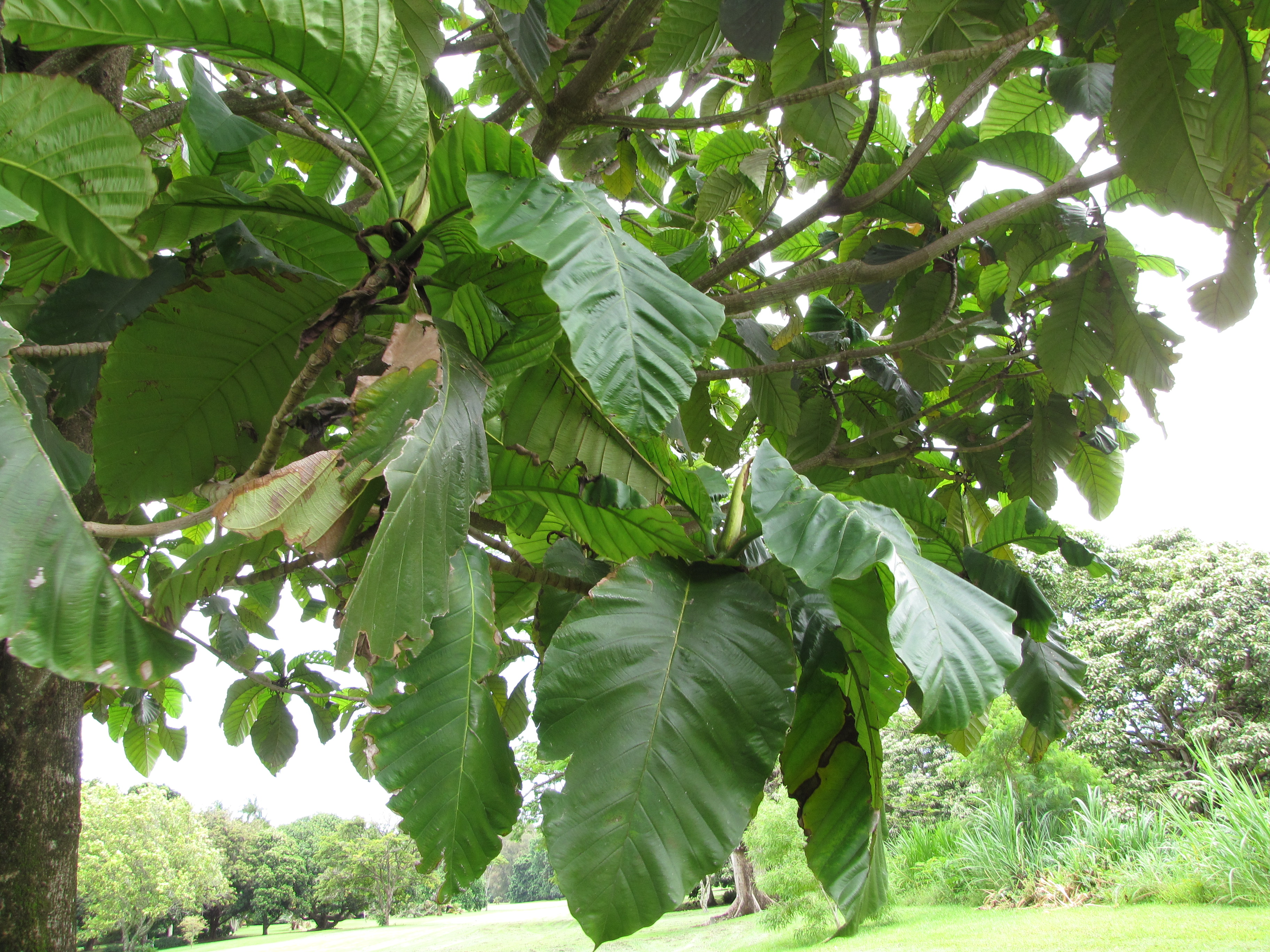

Conservation status
- Least Concern (IUCN 3.1)

Scientific classification
- Kingdom: Plantae
- Clade: Tracheophytes
- Clade: Angiosperms
- Clade: Eudicots
- Clade: Rosids
- Order: Rosales
- Family: Moraceae
- Genus: Artocarpus
- Species: A. sericicarpus

Binomial name
- Artocarpus sericicarpus F.M.Jarrett

= Artocarpus sericicarpus =

Species of flowering plant

Artocarpus sericicarpus, the peluntan, pedalai, gumihan or terap bulu, is a tropical evergreen tree species of the family Moraceae. It is a member of the genus Artocarpus, which also includes jackfruit and breadfruit.

The tree is native to Borneo, the Philippines, the Maluku Islands and Sulawesi, and is most commonly found in humid tropics with a mild monsoon climate, occurring in tropical evergreen forests at 500–1,000 metres (1,600–3,300 ft) elevation. It is also occasionally found in steep, clayey hillsides of inland areas. The discovery date is not clear as it is listed as 1959 in one book and 1961 in the other.

It is a very large rainforest tree to 40 m (120 ft). Similar to the marang fruit (Artocarpus odoratissimus), the pulp of the fruit is edible and considered very tasty but A. sericicarpus does not have strong odor of the marang. The seeds are also edible, people normally boil or roast them and consume them like peanuts. Artocarpus sericicarpus measures up to 30–40 m (100–130 ft), stipule are lanceolate and measure at 6–12 centimetres (2–5 in) and its dark green leaves are elliptic and ovate and measure at 20–70 cm (8–28 in) by 10–50 cm (4–20 in). The tree's bark is also used to make barkcloth.

The fruit is hairy, and looks like a giant rambutan. When the globular fruits (15 cm (6 in) diameter) are ripe, the skins are bright orange, covered with hair. The pulp is white in color and tastes very sweet. Some say the Pedalai fruit is the tastiest of all Artocarpus.
