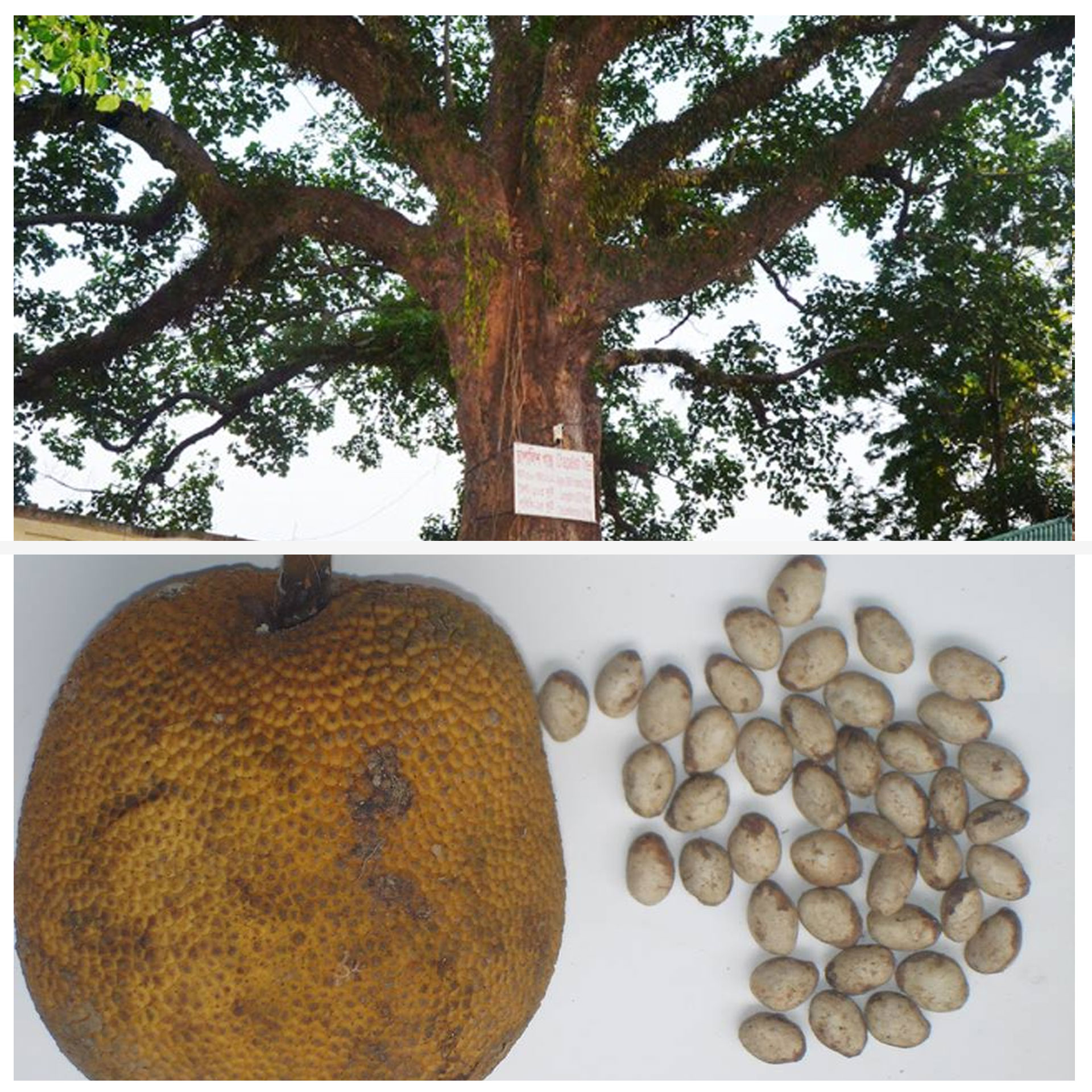

Scientific classification
- Kingdom: Plantae
- Clade: Tracheophytes
- Clade: Angiosperms
- Clade: Eudicots
- Clade: Rosids
- Order: Rosales
- Family: Moraceae
- Tribe: Artocarpeae
- Genus: Artocarpus
- Subgenus: A. subg. Artocarpus
- Species: A. chama

Binomial name
- Artocarpus chama Buch.-Ham.

Synonyms
- Artocarpus asperulus Gagnep.; Artocarpus chaplasha Roxb.; Artocarpus melinoxylus Gagnep.; Ficus chrysophthalma (Miq.) Miq.; Urostigma chrysopthalmum Miq.; Saccus calophyllus (J.N.Haage & E.Schmidt) Kuntze; Saccus chaplasha (Roxb.) Kuntze

= Artocarpus chama =

Species of flowering plant

Artocarpus chama is a tree in the family Moraceae: a wild species of the breadfruit/jackfruit genus (Artocarpus) and may be referred to as the 'chaplaish'; its Vietnamese name is mít nài (also used for other forest species). Distribution records are from: Yunnan China, Bangladesh, Bhutan, India, Laos, Malaysia, Myanmar, Sikkim and Thailand.

== Names ==
The fruit of the tree is known as Te.brong in the Garo language.
