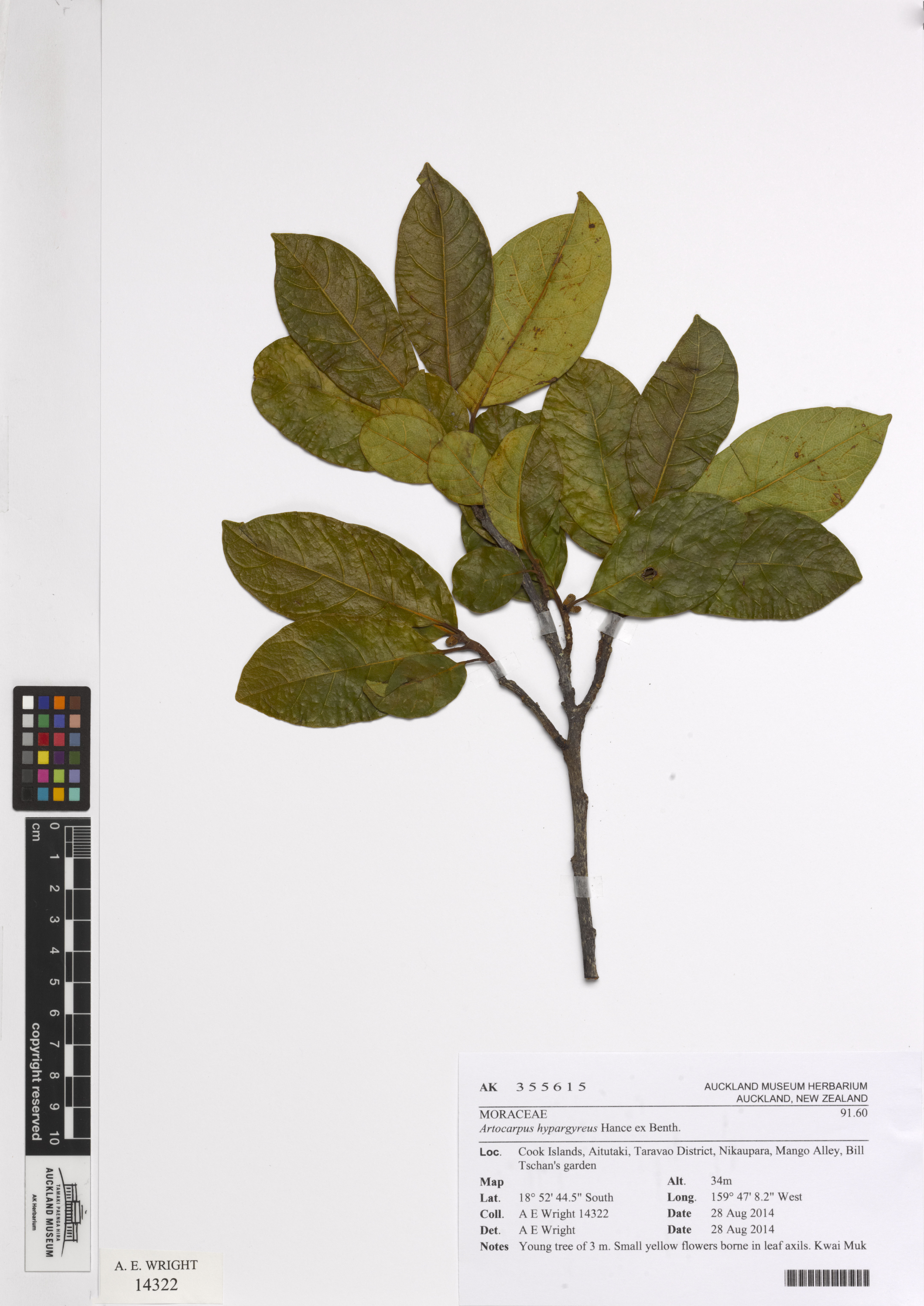

Conservation status
- Near Threatened (IUCN 3.1)

Scientific classification
- Kingdom: Plantae
- Clade: Tracheophytes
- Clade: Angiosperms
- Clade: Eudicots
- Clade: Rosids
- Order: Rosales
- Family: Moraceae
- Genus: Artocarpus
- Species: A. hypargyreus

Binomial name
- Artocarpus hypargyreus Hance ex Benth.

= Artocarpus hypargyreus =

Species of plant

Artocarpus hypargyreus is a species of flowering plant in the family Moraceae. It is a tree endemic to southern China. It is threatened by habitat loss.
