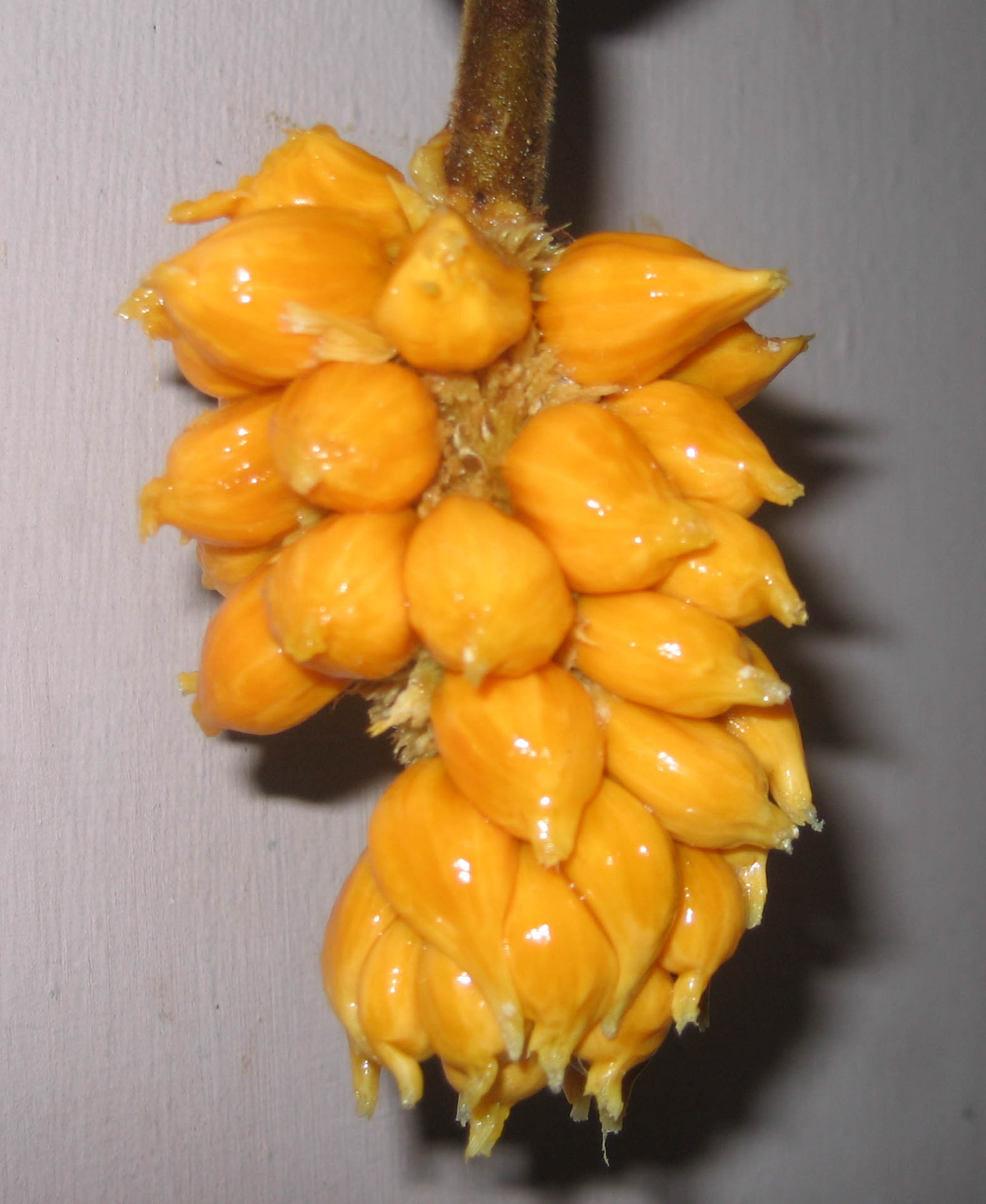
- Ripe fruit

Conservation status
- Least Concern (IUCN 3.1)

Scientific classification
- Kingdom: Plantae
- Clade: Tracheophytes
- Clade: Angiosperms
- Clade: Eudicots
- Clade: Rosids
- Order: Rosales
- Family: Moraceae
- Genus: Artocarpus
- Species: A. hirsutus

Binomial name
- Artocarpus hirsutus Lam.

Synonyms
- Artocarpus pubescens Willd., nom. illeg. homonym. post.; Saccus hirsutus (Lam.) Kuntze

= Artocarpus hirsutus =

Species of flowering plant

Artocarpus hirsutus, commonly known as wild jack, hairy bread-fruit tree, hirsute artocarpus or Maria plum is a tropical evergreen tree species native to India. It is found primarily in Kerala, but also in Karnataka, Maharashtra and Tamil Nadu, where it grows in moist, deciduous to partially evergreen woodlands.

== Description ==
Artocarpus hirsutus grows as a canopy tree and can reach a height of up to 35 metres (115 ft) and about 4.5 m (15 ft) in girth.

The leaves are simple and phyllotaxy is alternate. The shape can be described as elliptic or ovate with 10–25 cm (4–10 in) × 5–14 cm (2–6 in) size. When it is young it is densely hirsute beneath. The apex of leaf is sub-acute or shortly acuminate, base is rounded or sub-acute, and margins undulate. Ten to twelve pairs of secondary nerves can be visible, and the length of petiole is about 1.5–3 cm (0.6–1.2 in).

The flowers are unisexual, in axillary inflorescences and its fruits are syncarps and very sweet, changing to an orange hue when ripe. Its simple, alternate leaves will ooze latex if broken. It is harvested for its wood.

The ripe fruit is eaten after removing the spiny outer skin. The structure of the fruit is similar to that of the much larger jackfruit. The seeds are also edible, usually fried as a snack.

== Distribution and habitat ==
Artocarpus hirsutus grows at elevations from sea level to around 1,000 m (3,300 ft) in places with an annual rainfall of 1,500 mm (60 in) or more. The species is endemic to the Western Ghats where it is found in evergreen forests. It is a common tree in evergreen and semi-evergreen forests from South Maharashtra to Kanyakumari

== Uses ==
Artocarpus hirsutus is prized for its durable timber which is comparable in quality with teak. The timber was used extensively in the construction of ceilings, door frames and furniture in older buildings, especially in Kerala. The famous snake boats of Kerala are often hewn out of the Anjili's wood. 140 tons of A. hisutus wood from Kerala was used for Tim Severin's ship Sohar, in which he traveled from Muscat to Canton in 1980-81.

== Diseases ==
The important diseases of Artocarpus hirsutus reported from Southern part of India (Kerala state) are Pink disease (Corticium salmonicolor) & Macrophomina leaf spots (Macrophomina phaseolina).

== In culture ==
The timber of Artocarpus hirsutus, locally called anjili in Kerala, is used to make Palliyodam, a type of barge built and used by Aranmula Parthasarathy Temple in Kerala for the annual water processions of Uthrattathi Jalamela and Valla Sadhya. The species' fruit is locally called mariyappazham in Kerala.

== Gallery ==
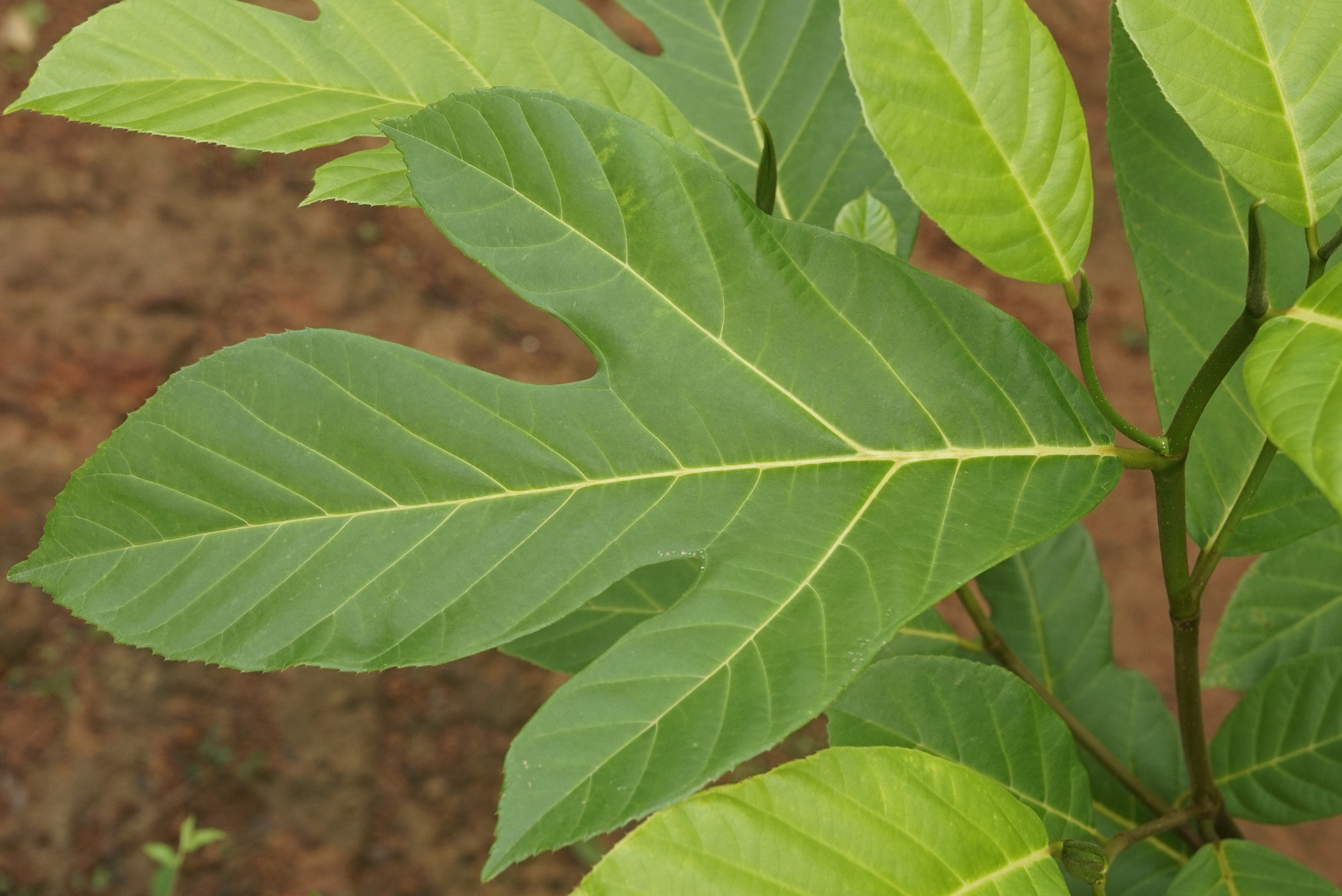
seedling

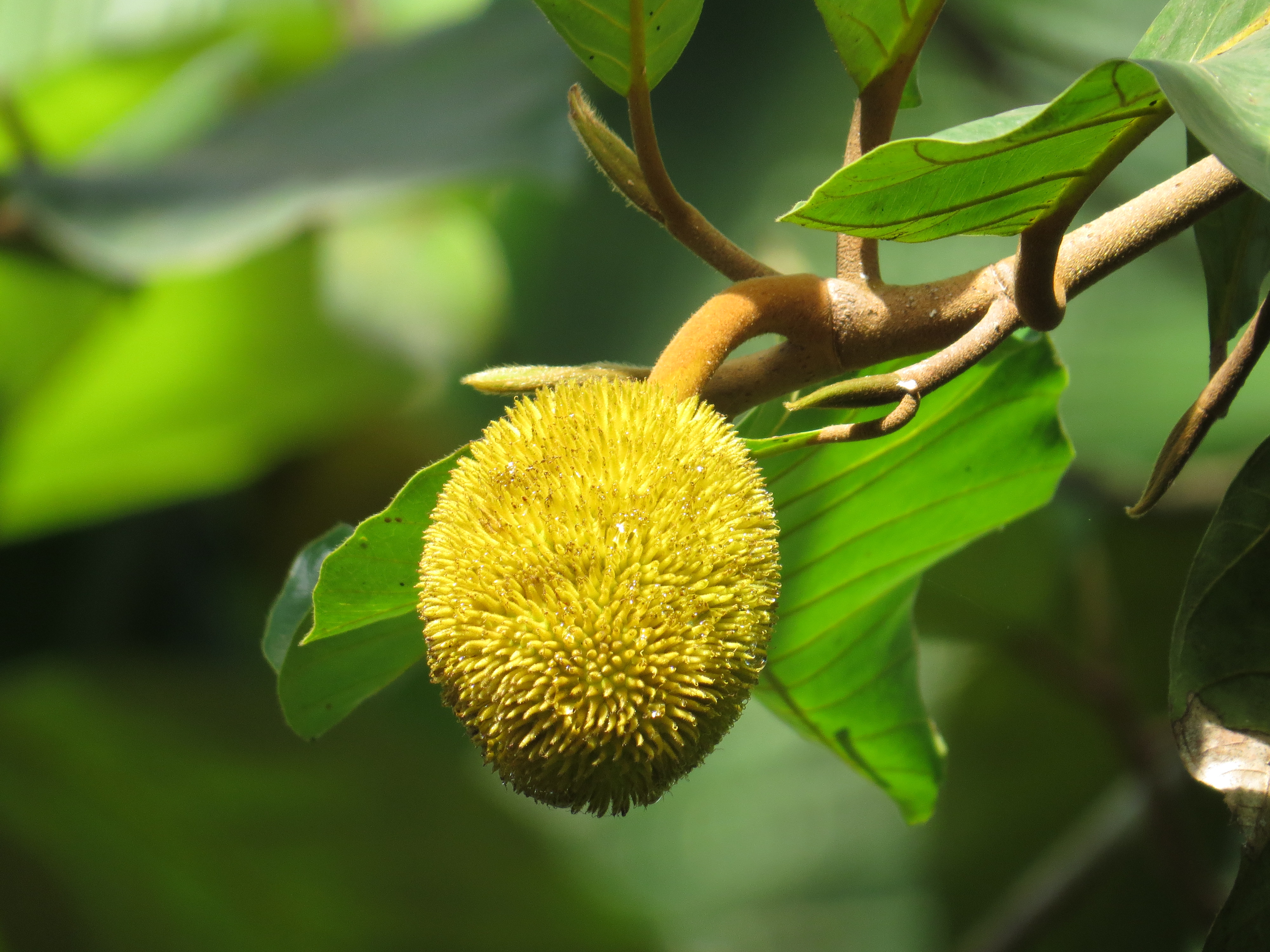
Unripe fruit

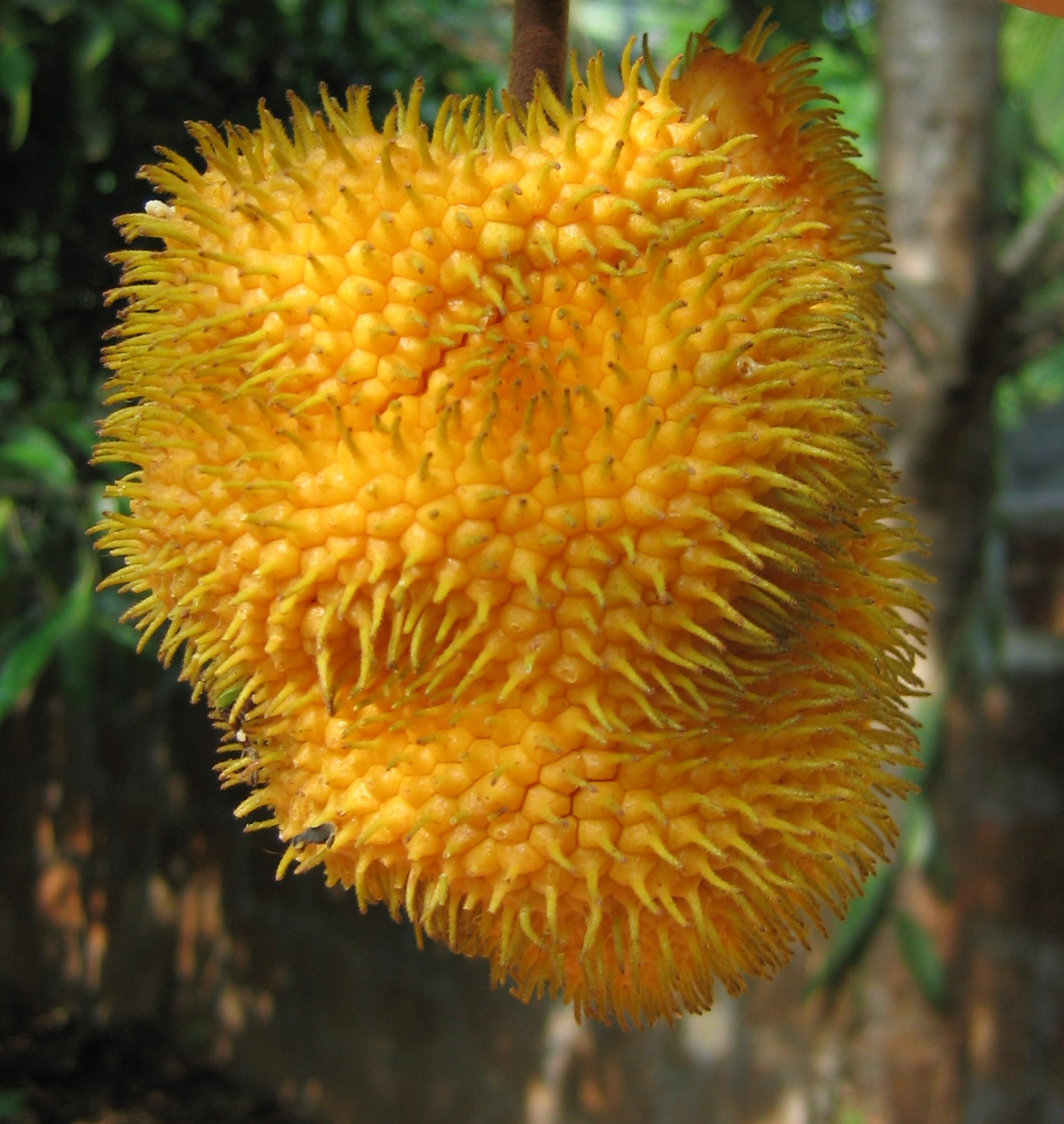
Ripe fruit

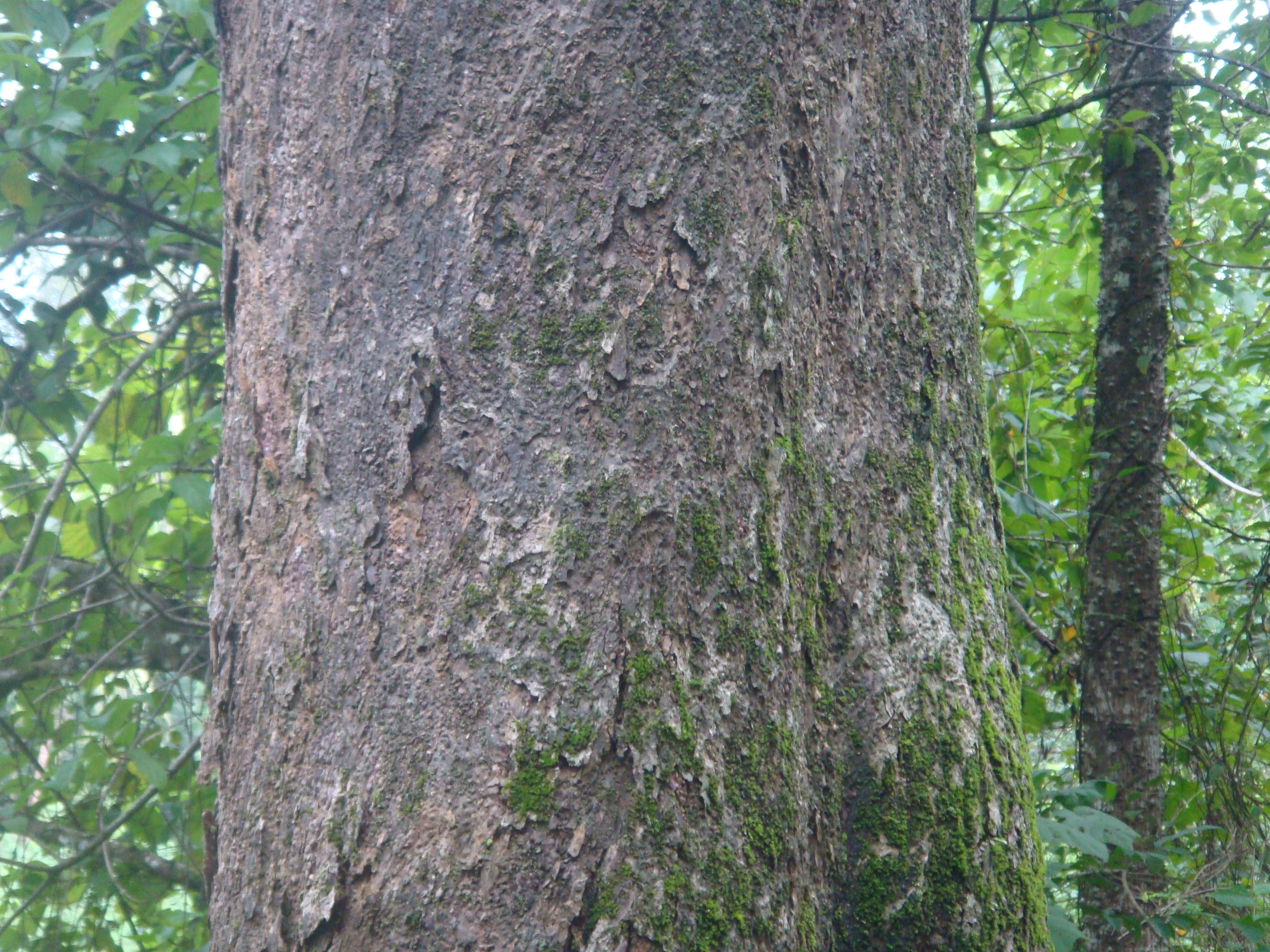
Bark

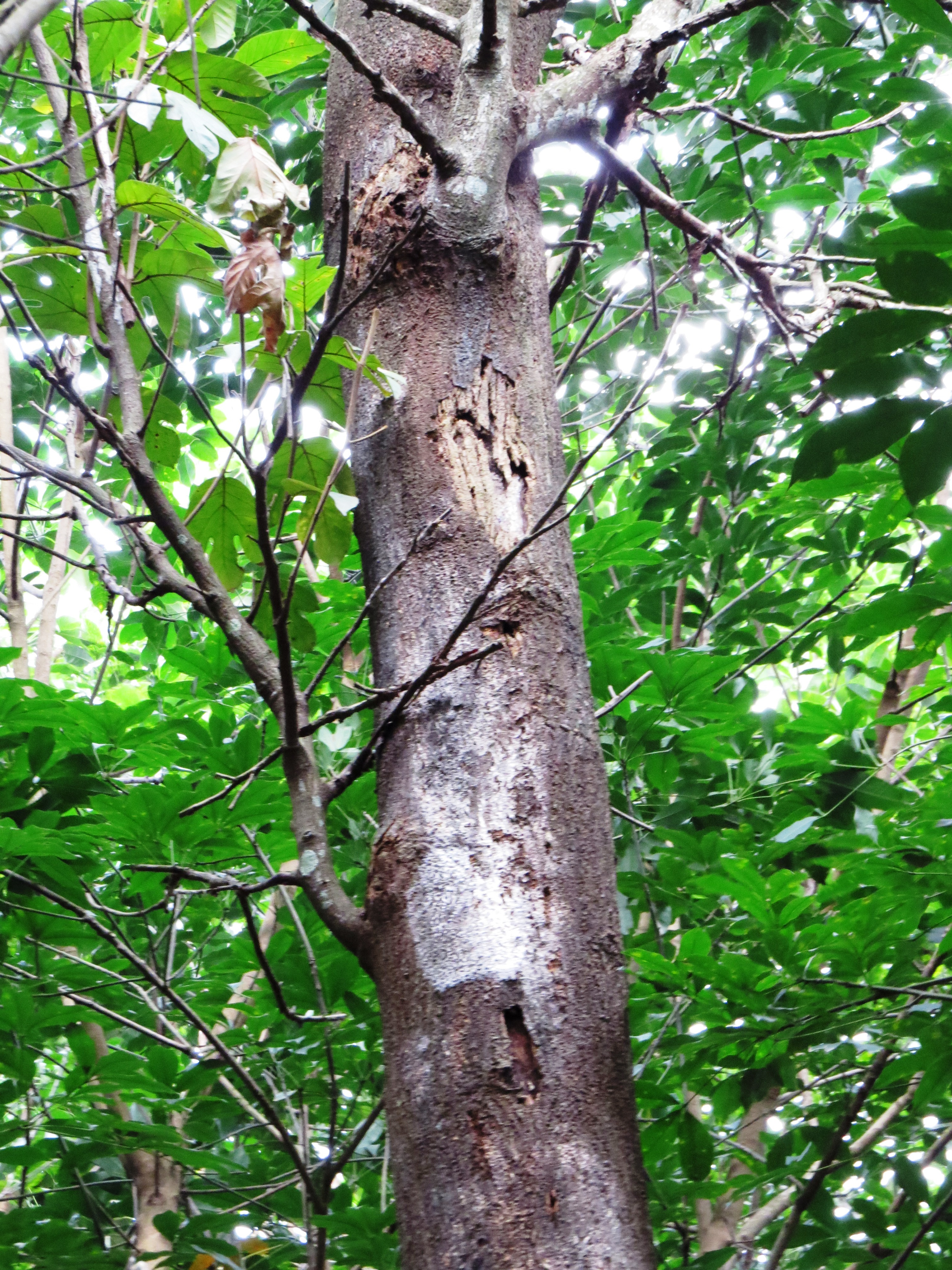
Trunk with fungal infection
