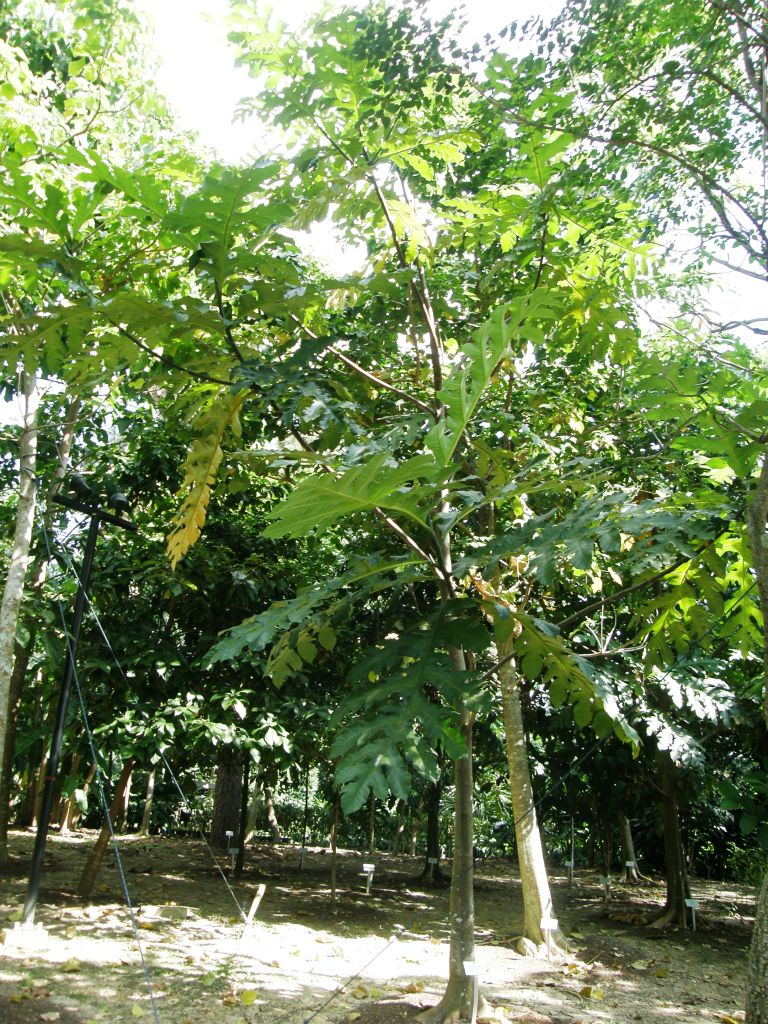
- The branches, leaves and bark of A. scortechinii

Conservation status
- Near Threatened (IUCN 3.1)

Scientific classification
- Kingdom: Plantae
- Clade: Tracheophytes
- Clade: Angiosperms
- Clade: Eudicots
- Clade: Rosids
- Order: Rosales
- Family: Moraceae
- Genus: Artocarpus
- Species: A. scortechinii

Binomial name
- Artocarpus scortechinii King

Synonyms
- Saccus scortechinii (King) Kuntze

= Artocarpus scortechinii =

Species of flowering plant

Artocarpus scortechinii is a species of flowering plant in the family Moraceae. It is native to Peninsular Malaysia and Sumatra.
