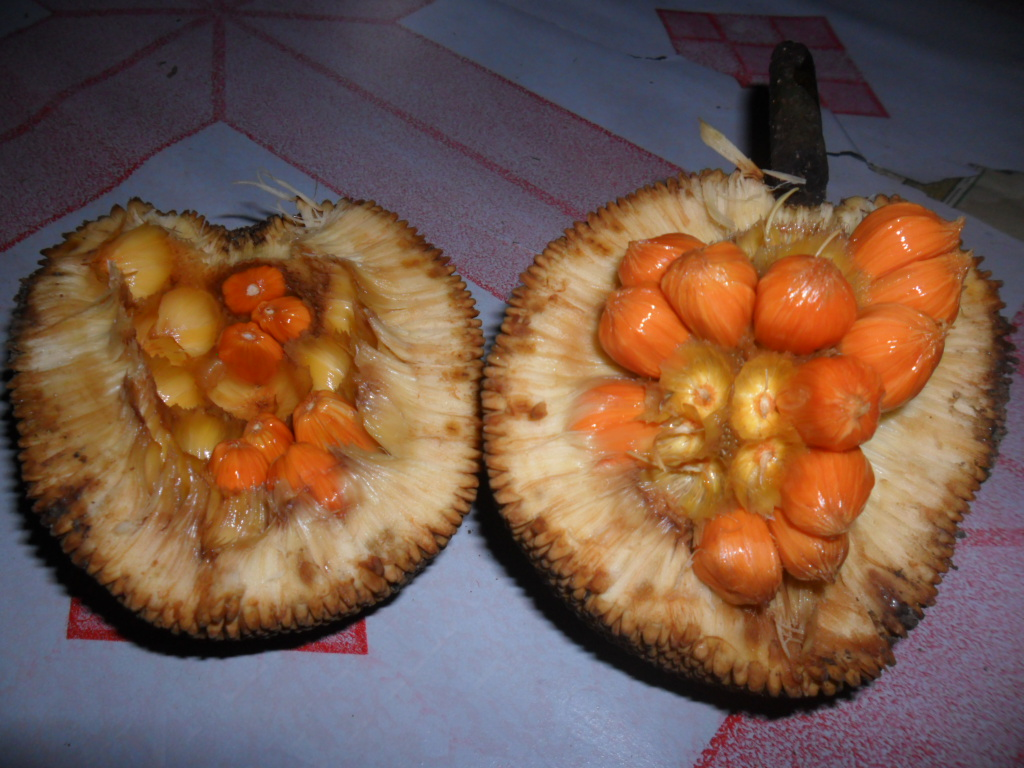
- Opened fruits from Borneo

Conservation status
- Least Concern (IUCN 3.1)

Scientific classification
- Kingdom: Plantae
- Clade: Tracheophytes
- Clade: Angiosperms
- Clade: Eudicots
- Clade: Rosids
- Order: Rosales
- Family: Moraceae
- Genus: Artocarpus
- Species: A. lanceifolius

Binomial name
- Artocarpus lanceifolius Roxb.

Synonyms
- Saccus lanceifolius (Roxb.) Kuntze; Artocarpus reticulatus W.Hunter, nom. illeg. homonym. post.

= Artocarpus lanceifolius =

Species of fruit tree

Artocarpus lanceifolius, also known as keledang in Malay and more locally as timakon or kaliput, is a species of flowering plant, a fruit tree in the fig family, that is native to Southeast Asia.

== Description ==
The species grows as a monoecious tree to 35 m in height, with a bole of up to 5 m. The smooth oval to lance-shaped leaves are 12–30 cm long by 6–17 cm wide. The inflorescences occur in the leaf axils. The fruits are infructescent, olive to brown in colour, 8–12 cm by 7–8 cm in diameter, containing seeds covered by an edible, sweet and juicy aril.

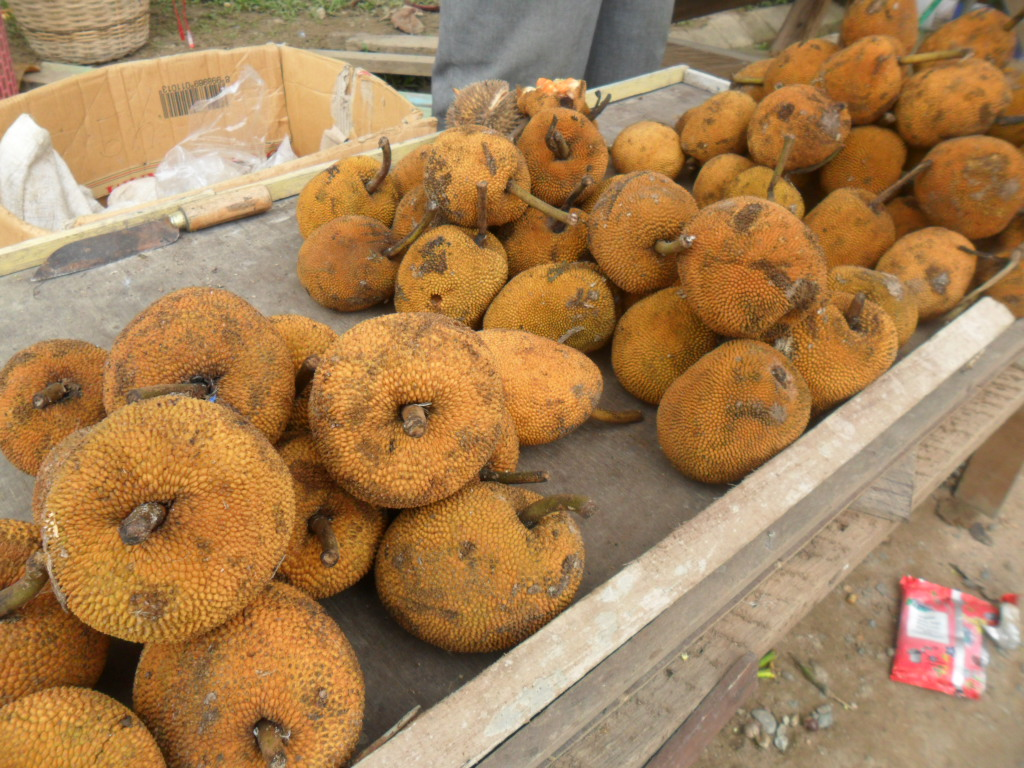
Whole fruits

=== Variety ===
A variety endemic to north-eastern Borneo, sometimes considered a subspecies A. l. clementis, differs in having somewhat more lanceolate leaves, and the fruits having an orange (rather than white) aril. Plants of the World Online accepts it as a distinct species, Artocarpus clementis.

== Distribution and habitat ==
The species is found in the Malay Peninsula, Sumatra and Borneo, where it occurs as an understorey tree of lowland and hill mixed dipterocarp forest and secondary forest up to an elevation of 1,000 m.
