= Artocarpus teysmannii =

Conservation status
- Least Concern (IUCN 3.1)

Scientific classification
- Kingdom: Plantae
- Clade: Tracheophytes
- Clade: Angiosperms
- Clade: Eudicots
- Clade: Rosids
- Order: Rosales
- Family: Moraceae
- Genus: Artocarpus
- Species: A. teysmannii

Binomial name
- Artocarpus teysmannii Miq.

Synonyms
- Artocarpus peduncularis Kurz; Saccus peduncularis (Kurz) Kuntze; Saccus teysmannii (Miq.) Kuntze

Species of flowering plant

Artocarpus teysmannii, also known as cempedak air in Malay and as tilap in Indonesia, is a species of flowering plant, a fruit tree in the fig family, that is native to Southeast Asia.

== Description ==
The species grows as a monoecious tree to 45 m in height, with a bole of up to 7 m, small buttresses, and with white latex. The oval leaves are 15–35 cm long by 5–17 cm wide. The globular inflorescences occur in the leaf axils. The fruits are cylindrical or oblong syncarpous infructescences, 8.5–12 cm by 3–6 cm in diameter, covered by short, flexible, conical spines, and ripening brownish-yellow. The seeds are covered by an edible, sweet, white aril.

== Distribution and habitat ==
The species is found in the Nicobar Islands, Peninsular Thailand, Malay Peninsula, Borneo, Sumatra, Sulawesi, the Sulu Archipelago, and Western New Guinea, where it occurs naturally in lowland and hill mixed dipterocarp forest, as well as in swamp forest, up to an elevation of 1,000 m.
