= Artocarpus treculianus =

Conservation status
- Least Concern (IUCN 3.1)

Scientific classification
- Kingdom: Plantae
- Clade: Tracheophytes
- Clade: Angiosperms
- Clade: Eudicots
- Clade: Rosids
- Order: Rosales
- Family: Moraceae
- Genus: Artocarpus
- Species: A. treculianus

Binomial name
- Artocarpus treculianus Elmer

Synonyms
- Artocarpus ovatifolius Merr. Artocarpus ovatifolius var. dolichostachys Merr. Artocarpus sorsogonensis Elmer ex Merr.

Species of flowering plant

Artocarpus treculianus is a species of flowering plant in the family Moraceae. It is a tree endemic to the Philippines. Local names include chipuho and tipuho. It grows in lowland rain forests and thickets at low and medium elevations, where it can reach up to 12 metres tall. It is threatened by habitat loss.

The species was described by Adolph Daniel Edward Elmer in 1909.

== See also ==
- Domesticated plants and animals of Austronesia
