= Artocarpus nigrifolius =

Scientific classification
- Kingdom: Plantae
- Clade: Tracheophytes
- Clade: Angiosperms
- Clade: Eudicots
- Clade: Rosids
- Order: Rosales
- Family: Moraceae
- Genus: Artocarpus
- Species: A. nigrifolius

Binomial name
- Artocarpus nigrifolius C.Y. Wu

Species of plant

Artocarpus nigrifolius is a species of flowering plant in the genus Artocarpus. It is found in Yunnan.
