= Artocarpus styracifolius =

Conservation status
- Least Concern (IUCN 3.1)

Scientific classification
- Kingdom: Plantae
- Clade: Tracheophytes
- Clade: Angiosperms
- Clade: Eudicots
- Clade: Rosids
- Order: Rosales
- Family: Moraceae
- Genus: Artocarpus
- Species: A. styracifolius

Binomial name
- Artocarpus styracifolius Pierre

Synonyms
- Artocarpus bicolor Merr. & Chun

Species of flowering plant

Artocarpus styracifolius, also known as two-coloured jackfruit, is a plant of the Moraceae family. It is native to South-Central and Southeast China, Hainan (China), Laos, and Vietnam.

== Uses ==
The fruits of are widely cultivated in China to make jam and wine. The roots are documented as being used in folk medicine to treat rheumatism, psoatic strain, rheumatic heart disease, diabetes, and hemiplegic paralysis.
