= Artocarpus thailandicus =

Conservation status
- Least Concern (IUCN 3.1)

Scientific classification
- Kingdom: Plantae
- Clade: Tracheophytes
- Clade: Angiosperms
- Clade: Eudicots
- Clade: Rosids
- Order: Rosales
- Family: Moraceae
- Genus: Artocarpus
- Species: A. thailandicus

Binomial name
- Artocarpus thailandicus C.C.Berg

Species of flowering plant

Artocarpus thailandicus (Thai name: mahat) is a species of flowering plant in the family Moraceae. It is a tree native to northern and central Thailand. It grows in lowland tropical seasonally-dry deciduous forest below 1,000 metres elevation. Phylogenetically, it clusters with Artocarpus lacucha.
