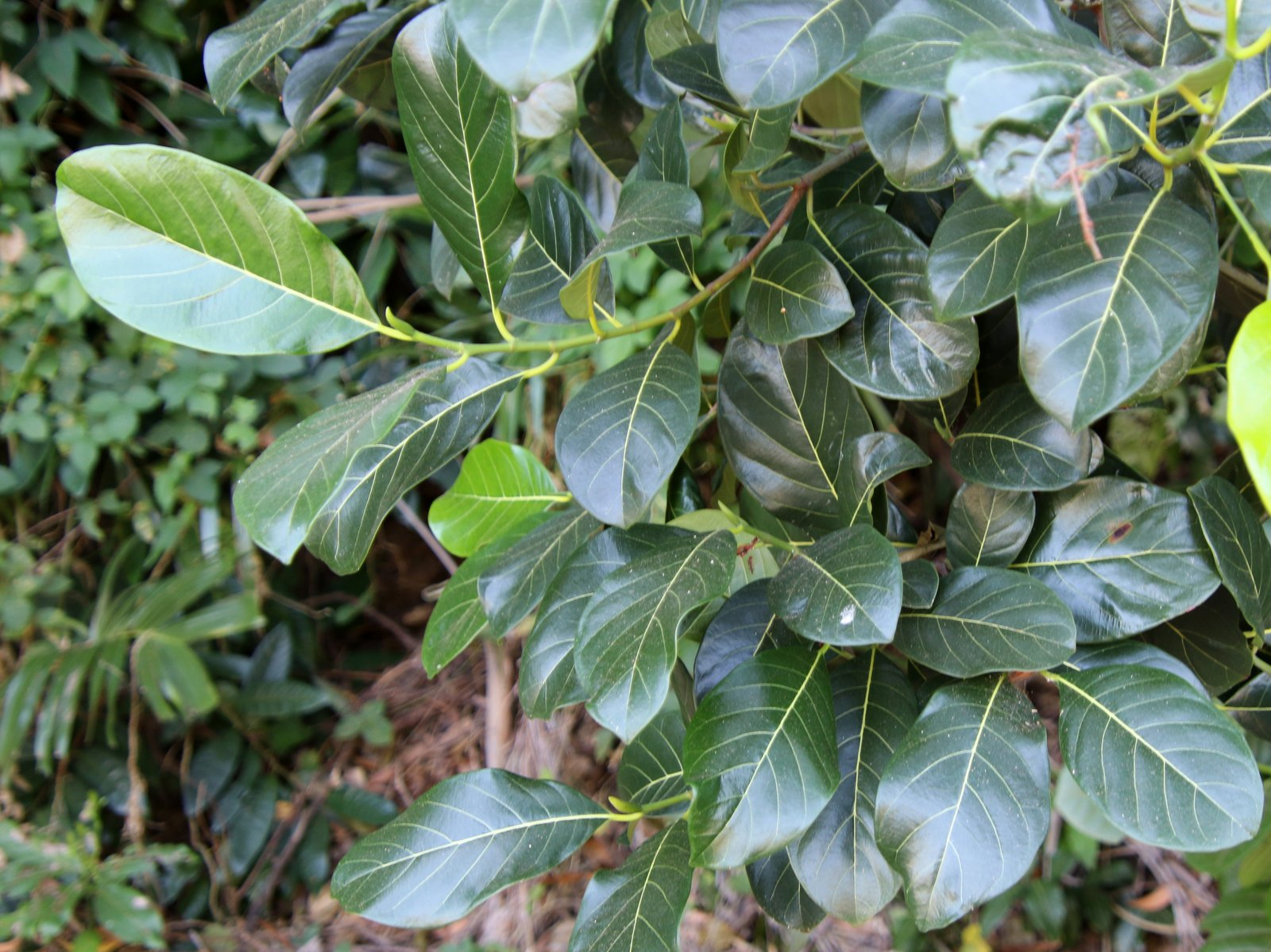
- Darwin, Northern Territory

Conservation status
- Least Concern (IUCN 3.1)

Scientific classification
- Kingdom: Plantae
- Clade: Embryophytes
- Clade: Tracheophytes
- Clade: Angiosperms
- Clade: Eudicots
- Clade: Rosids
- Order: Rosales
- Family: Moraceae
- Genus: Artocarpus
- Species: A. glaucus

Binomial name
- Artocarpus glaucus Blume

Synonyms
- Artocarpus biformis Miq.; Artocarpus denisonianus King; Artocarpus glaucescens Trécul; Artocarpus glaucus var. tephrophyllus (Miq.) Miq.; Artocarpus tephrophyllus Miq.; Artocarpus zollingerianus Miq.; Saccus biformis (Miq.) Kuntze; Saccus denisonianus (King) Kuntze; Saccus glaucescens (Trécul) Kuntze; Saccus glaucus (Blume) Kuntze; Saccus tephrophyllus (Miq.) Kuntze; Saccus zollingerianus (Miq.) Kuntze

= Artocarpus glaucus =

Species of flowering plant

Artocarpus glaucus is a tropical species of tree in the family Moraceae. It is found in Indonesia, Malaysia and Australia, ranging from Peninsular Malaysia through Sumatra, Borneo, Java, the Lesser Sunda Islands, and the Maluku Islands to the Northern Territory of Australia.
