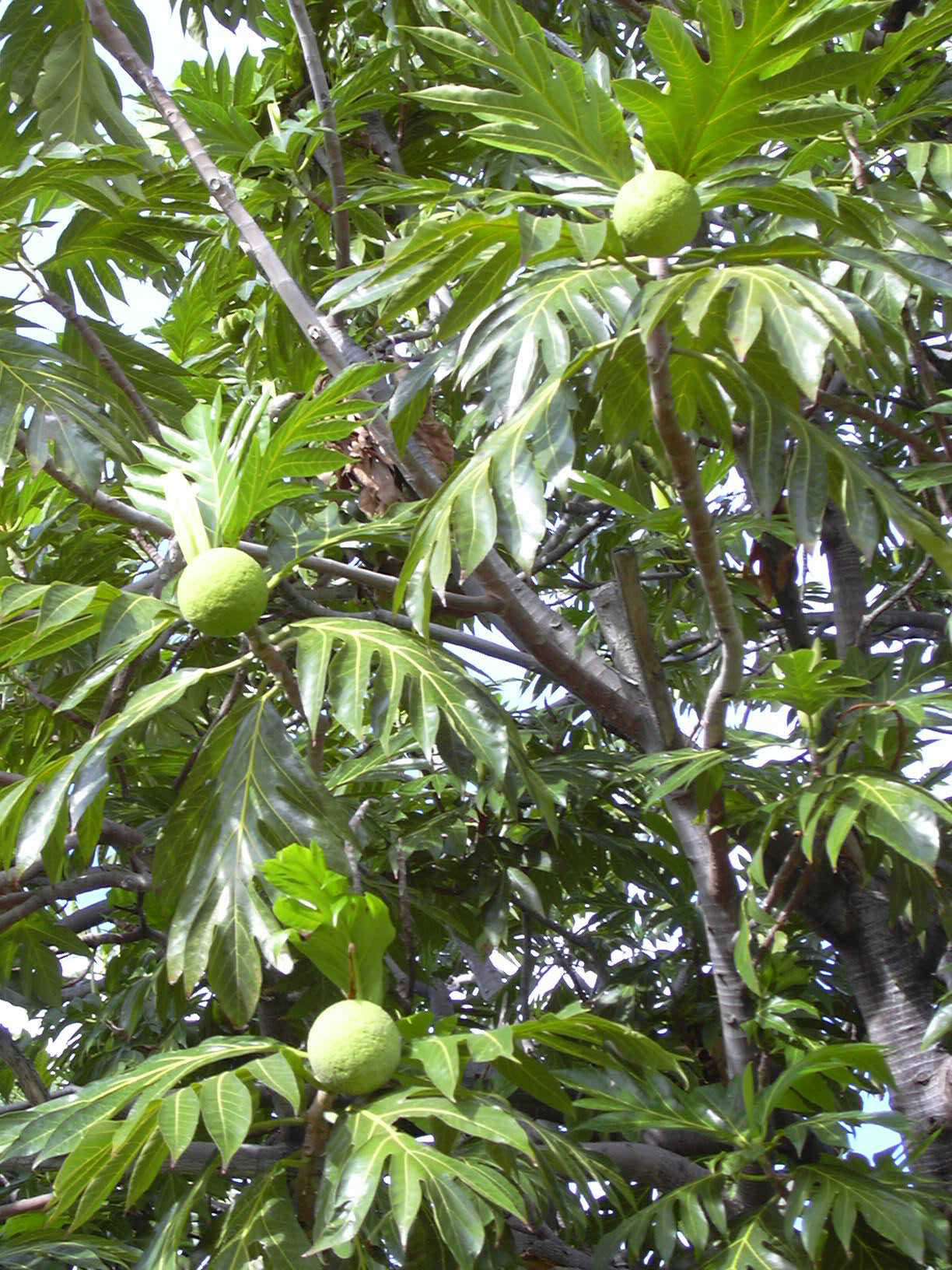
- Breadfruit (Artocarpus altilis)

Scientific classification
- Kingdom: Plantae
- Clade: Tracheophytes
- Clade: Angiosperms
- Clade: Eudicots
- Clade: Rosids
- Order: Rosales
- Family: Moraceae
- Tribe: Artocarpeae
- Genus: Artocarpus; J.R.Forst. & G.Forst. (1776)

Species
- See text

Synonyms
- Gigotorcya Buc'hoz (1783); Polyphema Lour. (1790); Radermachia Thunb. (1776); Rima Sonn. (1776); Saccus Rumph. ex Kuntze (1891), nom. superfl.; Sitodium Parkinson (1773)

= Artocarpus =

Genus of trees and shrubs

Artocarpus is a genus of approximately 60 trees and shrubs of Southeast Asian and Pacific origin, belonging to the mulberry family, Moraceae. Most species of Artocarpus are restricted to Southeast Asia; a few cultivated species are more widely distributed, especially A. altilis (breadfruit) and A. heterophyllus (jackfruit), which are cultivated throughout the tropics.

== Description ==
All Artocarpus species are laticiferous trees or shrubs that are composed of leaves, twigs and stems capable of producing a milky sap. The flora type is monoecious and produces unisexual flowers; furthermore, both sexes are present within the same plant. The plants produce small, greenish, female flowers that grow on short, fleshy spikes. Following pollination, the flowers grow into a syncarpous fruit, and these are capable of growing into very large sizes. The stipulated leaves vary from small and entire (Artocarpus integer) to large and lobed (Artocarpus altilis), with the cordate leaves of the species A. altilis ending in long, sharp tips.

== Taxonomy ==
The name Artocarpus is derived from the Greek words artos ("bread") and karpos ("fruit"). This name was coined by Johann Reinhold Forster and J. Georg Adam Forster, a father-and-son team of botanists aboard HMS Resolution on James Cook's second voyage; they used it in their book Characteres generum plantarum. It is maintained as a conserved name.

Although fossils of Artocarpus have been reported from as early as the Late Cretaceous, these fossils generally that lack key diagnostic characters such as that could definitively place them in the genus. The last common ancestor of all living Artocarpus likely originated in the vicinity of Borneo, from which Artocarpus dispersed elsewhere in Asia and Oceania.

=== Subgenera ===
Recent phylogenetic research, based on leaf arrangement, leaf anatomical characters and stipules, indicates that there are at least two subgenera in Artocarpus:

- Subgenus Artocarpus: Perianth of fruit is partially connate (fused).
- Subgenus Pseudojaca: Perianth is entirely connate.
- Subgenus Cauliflori

Subgenus Pseudojaca is allied to the genus Prainea, and some researchers treat this taxon as a fourth subgenus of Artocarpus.

==== Extant species ====
Subgenus	Image	Scientific name	Common name	Distribution
Artocarpus		Artocarpus altilis (Parkinson) Fosberg	Breadfruit, Seedless breadfruit, Sukun, Kolo, Rimas, Anubing	Oceania from New Guinea through the Indo-Malayan Archipelago to western Micronesia
Artocarpus		Artocarpus anisophyllus Miq.	Popwan, Entawak, Mentawa	Palawan (Philippines), Peninsular Malaysia, Sumatra, Borneo
Artocarpus		Artocarpus blancoi (Elmer) Merr.	Antipolo	Philippines (Endemic)
Artocarpus		Artocarpus brevipedunculatus (F. M. Jarrett) C. C. Berg		Borneo
Artocarpus		Artocarpus camansi Blanco	Breadnut, Kamansi, Kluwih, Deeball, Seeded breadfruit	Philippines, Indonesia, Papua New Guinea
Artocarpus		Artocarpus corneri Kochummen		Borneo (Sarawak)
Artocarpus		Artocarpus chama Buch.-Ham.	Chaplaish	Yunnan China, Bangladesh, Bhutan, India, Laos, Malaysia, Myanmar, Sikkim, Thailand
Artocarpus		Artocarpus elasticus Reinw. ex Blume	Benda, Bendo, Teureup, Malagumihan	Burma, Thailand, Peninsular Malaysia, Sumatra, Java, Lesser Sunda Islands, Borneo, Philippines, Sulawesi, Moluccas
Artocarpus		Artocarpus excelsus Jarrett		Borneo (Sabah)
Artocarpus		Artocarpus glaucus Blume		Indonesia, Malaysia, Australia
Artocarpus		Artocarpus hirsutus Lam.	Anjily, WildJack, Jungle Jack, Angelin, Hirsute Artocarpus, Aini Maram, Aini	Western Ghats, India
Artocarpus		Artocarpus hispidus Jarrett		Peninsular Malaysia
Artocarpus		Artocarpus horridus Jarrett		Maluku
Artocarpus		Artocarpus jarrettiae Kochummen		Borneo (Sabah, Sarawak)
Artocarpus		Artocarpus kemando Miq.	Pudau, Pudu	Thailand, Peninsular Malaysia, Sumatra, Borneo
Artocarpus		Artocarpus lanceifolius Roxb.	Keledang	Indonesia
Artocarpus		Artocarpus lowii King		Peninsula Malaysia to Sumatera
Artocarpus		Artocarpus maingayi King		Borneo
Artocarpus		Artocarpus mariannensis Trécul	Dugdug	Mariana Islands and Guam
Artocarpus		Artocarpus melinoxylus Gagnep.		Vietnam
Artocarpus		Artocarpus multifidus Jarrett		Philippines (Mindanao, Samar)
Artocarpus		Artocarpus nobilis Thwaites	Ceylon breadfruit	south western regions of Sri Lanka
Artocarpus		Artocarpus odoratissimus Blanco	Johey oak, Terap, Marang, Morangbaum	Borneo, Philippines (Palawan and Mindanao Island)
Artocarpus		Artocarpus obtusus Jarrett		Borneo (Sarawak)
Artocarpus		Artocarpus pinnatisectus Merr.		Philippines (Luzon, Mindanao)
Artocarpus		Artocarpus rigidus Blume	Monkey jackfruit	Indochina and Malesia
Artocarpus		Artocarpus sarawakensis F.M.Jarrett	Pingan, Mountain Terap	Sarawak
Artocarpus		Artocarpus scortechinii King	Two winged Artocarpus, Black Terap	Malaysia
Artocarpus		Artocarpus sepicanus Diels		New Guinea
Artocarpus		Artocarpus sericicarpus F.M.Jarrett	Peluntan, Gumihan, Pedalai, Hairy Terap	Borneo (Sarawak), Malaysia (Sabah), the Philippines (Mindoro), and Indonesia (Kalimantan)
Artocarpus		Artocarpus sumatranus Jarrett		Sumatra
Artocarpus		Artocarpus tamaran Becc.	Elephant Jack, Tamaran	Borneo
Artocarpus		Artocarpus teysmannii Miq.		Nicobar Islands, Peninsula Thailand to W. New Guinea
Artocarpus		Artocarpus treculianus Elmer	Tipuho, Pakak, Kabaya, Togop, Tugup	Batanes (Philippines)
Cauliflori (F.M. Jarrett) Zerega, Supardi, and Motley		Artocarpus annulatus Jarrett		Borneo (Sarawak)
Cauliflori (F.M. Jarrett) Zerega, Supardi, and Motley		Artocarpus heterophyllus Lam.	Nangka, Langka, Jackfruit	India, South East of Indian Subcontinent, China, Philippines
Cauliflori (F.M. Jarrett) Zerega, Supardi, and Motley		Artocarpus integer (Thunb.) Merr.	Cempedak, Badak	southeast Asia, especially from Malaysia and can be found in Indonesia to the island of New Guinea, Palawan, Philippines
Pseudojaca Trécul		Artocarpus albobrunneus Berg		Borneo (Kalimantan)
Pseudojaca Trécul		Artocarpus altissimus (Miq.) J. J. Smith		Peninsula Thailand, Sumatra, Borneo (Kalimantan)
Pseudojaca Trécul		Artocarpus borneensis Merr.	Tampang	Borneo
Pseudojaca Trécul		Artocarpus dadah Miq.	Dadah, Tampang	Sumatra
Pseudojaca Trécul		Artocarpus fretessii Teysm. & Binnend.		Eastern Borneo, the Philippines, Sulawesi, the Moluccas and Irian Jaya
Pseudojaca Trécul		Artocarpus fulvicortex Jarrett		Malaya to Sumatera
Pseudojaca Trécul		Artocarpus gomezianus Wall. ex Trécul	Sampang	Assam to W. Malesia
Pseudojaca Trécul		Artocarpus gongshanensis S.K.Wu ex C.Y.Wu & S.S.Chang		NW Yunnan, China
Pseudojaca Trécul		Artocarpus griffithii (King) Merr.	Beruni, Selanking	Southern China to Sumatra, Singapore and Borneo
Pseudojaca Trécul		Artocarpus humilis Becc.	Beruni, Selanking	Borneo
Pseudojaca Trécul		Artocarpus hypargyreus Hance ex Benth.	White Kwai Muk	China
Pseudojaca Trécul		Artocarpus lacucha Buch.-Ham.	Lakoocha, Monkey fruit, Deua	Indian Subcontinent and Southeast Asia
Pseudojaca Trécul		Artocarpus lamellosus Blanco	Butong	China (Guangdong, Guangxi, Hainan, S Hunan, S Yunnan), Cambodia, Indonesia, Laos, Malaysia, Philippines, Thailand, Vietnam
Pseudojaca Trécul		Artocarpus longifolius Becc.		Borneo
Pseudojaca Trécul		Artocarpus nanchuanensis S.S.Chang et al.		Chongqing (Nanchuan), China
Pseudojaca Trécul		Artocarpus nigrifolius C.Y.Wu		S Yunnan (Jinping), China
Pseudojaca Trécul		Artocarpus ovatus Blanco		Philippines
Pseudojaca Trécul		Artocarpus parvus Gagnep.	Kwai muk	South-East Asia, China
Pseudojaca Trécul		Artocarpus petelotii Gagnepain		China (SE Yunnan), N Vietnam
Pseudojaca Trécul		Artocarpus pithecogallus C.Y.Wu		China (Xishuangbanna, Yunnan)
Pseudojaca Trécul		Artocarpus primackiana Kochummen		Borneo (Sabah, Sarawak)
Pseudojaca Trécul		Artocarpus reticulatus Miq.		Sulawesi to Maluku
Pseudojaca Trécul		Artocarpus rubrovenia Warb.	Kalulot	Philippines
Pseudojaca Trécul		Artocarpus subrotundifolius Elmer		Philippines
Pseudojaca Trécul		Artocarpus styracifolius Pierre		China (Guangdong, Guangxi, Hainan, SW Hunan, SE Yunnan), Laos, Vietnam
Pseudojaca Trécul		Artocarpus thailandicus C.C.Berg		N Thailand
Pseudojaca Trécul		Artocarpus tomentosulus Jarrett		NE Borneo
Pseudojaca Trécul		Artocarpus tonkinensis A.Chev. ex Gagnep.		China (Fujian, Guangdong, Guangxi, Guizhou, Hainan, S Yunnan), Cambodia, N Vietnam
Pseudojaca Trécul		Artocarpus vrieseanus Miq.		Sulawesi to New Guinea
Pseudojaca Trécul		Artocarpus xanthocarpus Merr.		Taiwan (Lan Yu), Indonesia (Kalimantan), Philippines

== Fossil record ==
Fossil leaves and fruits of †Artocarpus dicksoni have been found in Cretaceous formations of West Greenland. Fossil leaves of †Artocarpus ordinarius have been found in Cretaceous stratum at the south bank of the Yukon River just above Rampart, Alaska. Fossils of †Artocarpus californica have been described from Eocene and Miocene strata of the Pacific coast of California and Oregon. Eight fossil species of Artocarpus (†A. capellinii, †A. isseli, †A. macrophylla, †A. massalongoi, †A. multinervis, †A. ovalifolia, †A. sismondai and †A. taramellii), from the lower Oligocene, have been described from a fossil leaves collected from 1857 to 1889 in Santa Giustina and Sassello in Central Liguria, Italy.

== Uses ==
Several species in the genus bear edible fruit and are commonly cultivated: Breadfruit (Artocarpus altilis), Cempedak (Artocarpus integer), Jackfruit (Artocarpus heterophyllus), Kwai Muk (Artocarpus parvus), Lakoocha (Artocarpus lakoocha), Pudau (Artocarpus kemando), Anjily (a.k.a. Jungle Jack) (Artocarpus hirsutus), Chaplaish (Artocarpus chama), and Marang (Artocarpus odoratissimus).

Breadfruit and jackfruit are cultivated widely in the tropical Southeast Asia. Other species are cultivated locally for their timber, fruit or edible seeds. Anjily, A. hirsutus, is grown for fruit and timber in the Western Ghats.

== Gallery ==
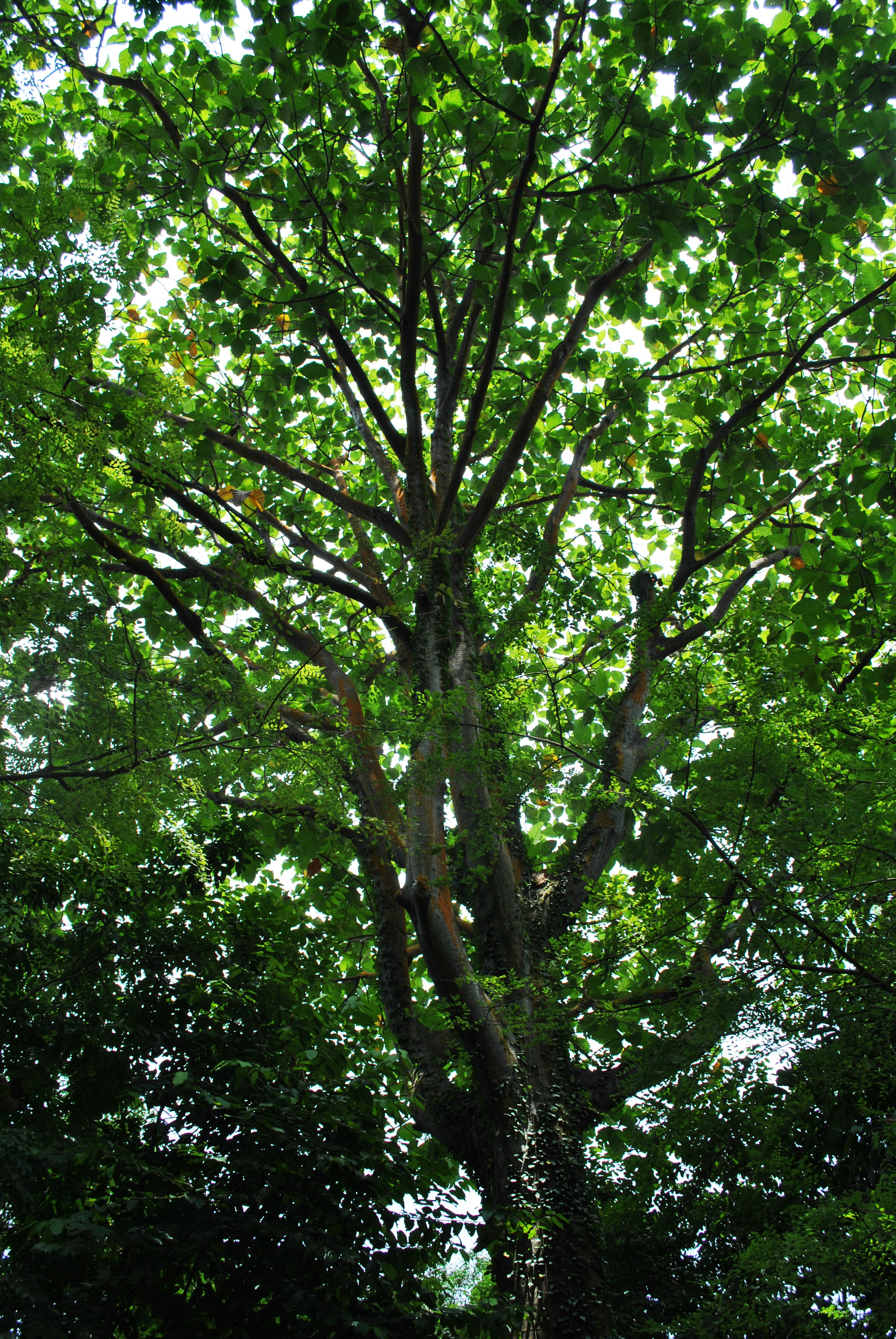
Artocarpus elasticus, Heritage Tree, Terap, Fort Canning, Singapore

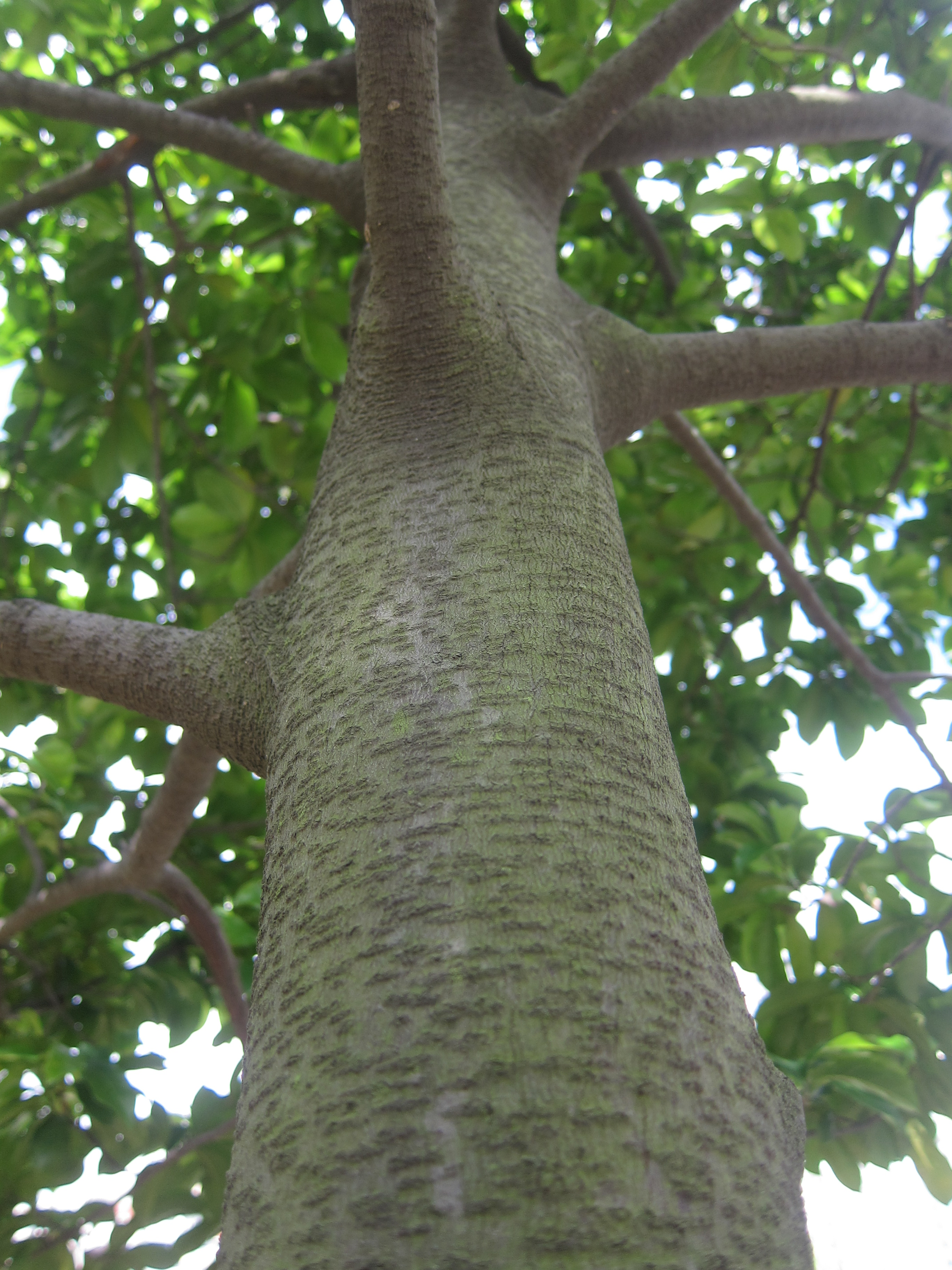
Bark of Artocarpus nitidus subsp. lingnanensis

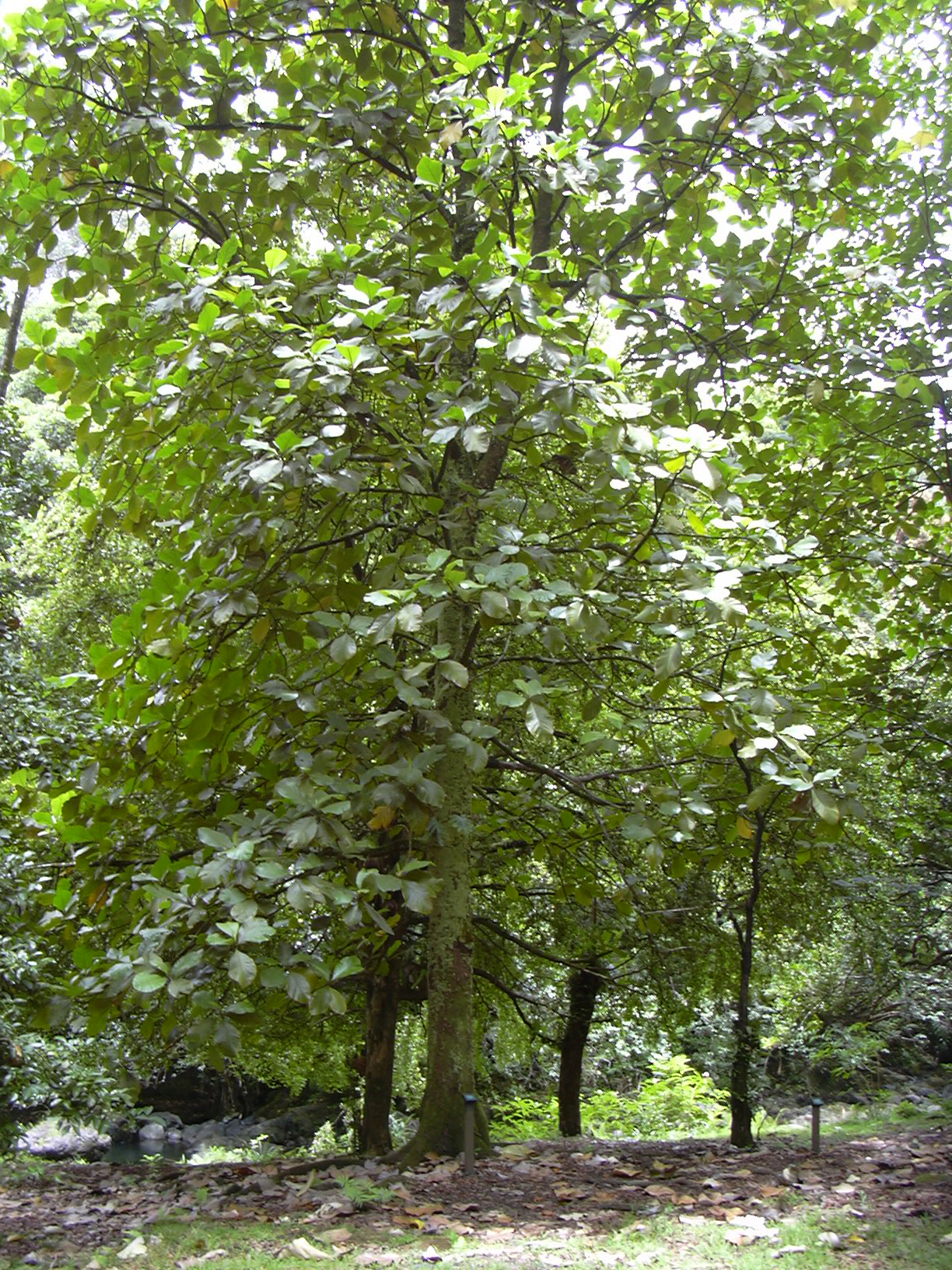
Marang (A. odoratissimus) is in the Artocarpus subgenus.

== See also ==
- Domesticated plants and animals of Austronesia
