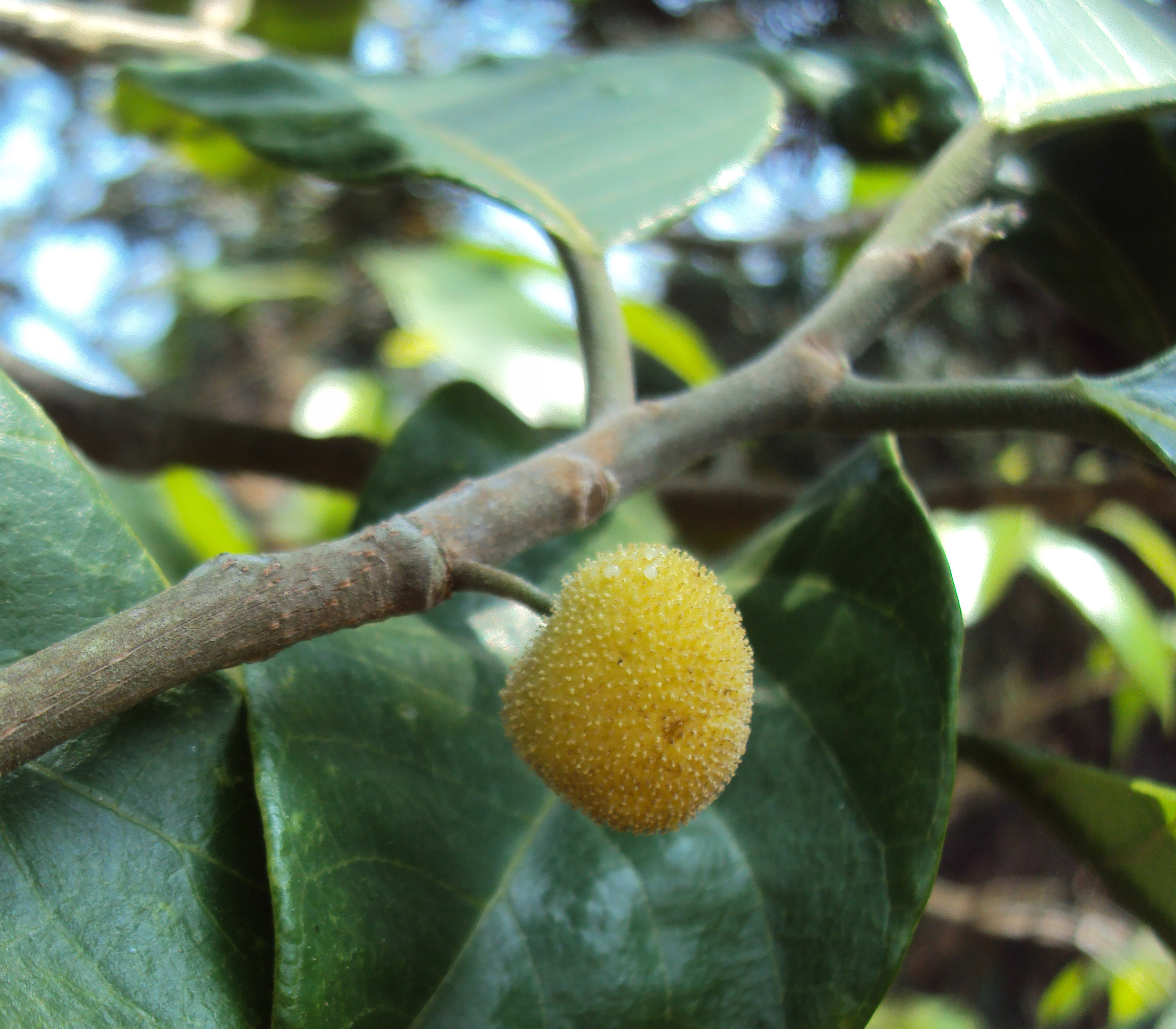

Conservation status
- Near Threatened (IUCN 3.1)

Scientific classification
- Kingdom: Plantae
- Clade: Tracheophytes
- Clade: Angiosperms
- Clade: Eudicots
- Clade: Rosids
- Order: Rosales
- Family: Moraceae
- Tribe: Artocarpeae
- Genus: Artocarpus
- Subgenus: A. subg. Pseudojaca
- Species: A. gomezianus

Binomial name
- Artocarpus gomezianus Wall. ex Trécul

Synonyms
- Artocarpus masticatus Gagnep.; Artocarpus petiolaris Miq.; Artocarpus pomiformis Teijsm. & Binn.; Artocarpus rigidus Wall.; Saccus gomezianus (Wall. ex Trécul) Kuntze; Saccus petiolaris (Miq.) Kuntze

= Artocarpus gomezianus =

Species of flowering plant

Artocarpus gomezianus is a tree in the family Moraceae and a wild species of the breadfruit or jackfruit genus (Artocarpus); it may be referred to as the 'sampang' and its Vietnamese name is mít chay. It is native to tropical Asia, from Assam through Indo-China to Peninsular Malaysia, Sumatra, Java, and the Philippines in Malesia.

== Gallery ==
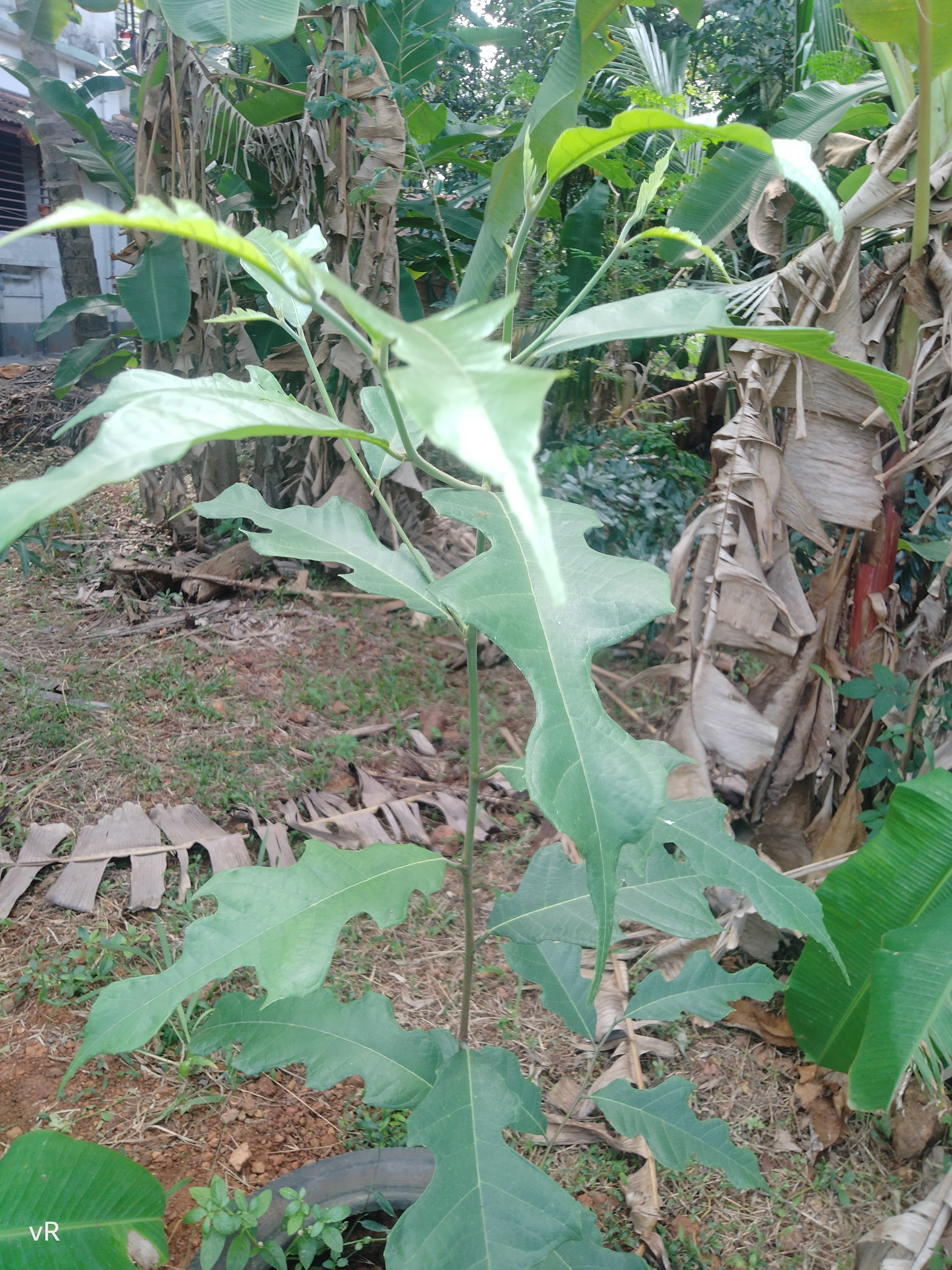

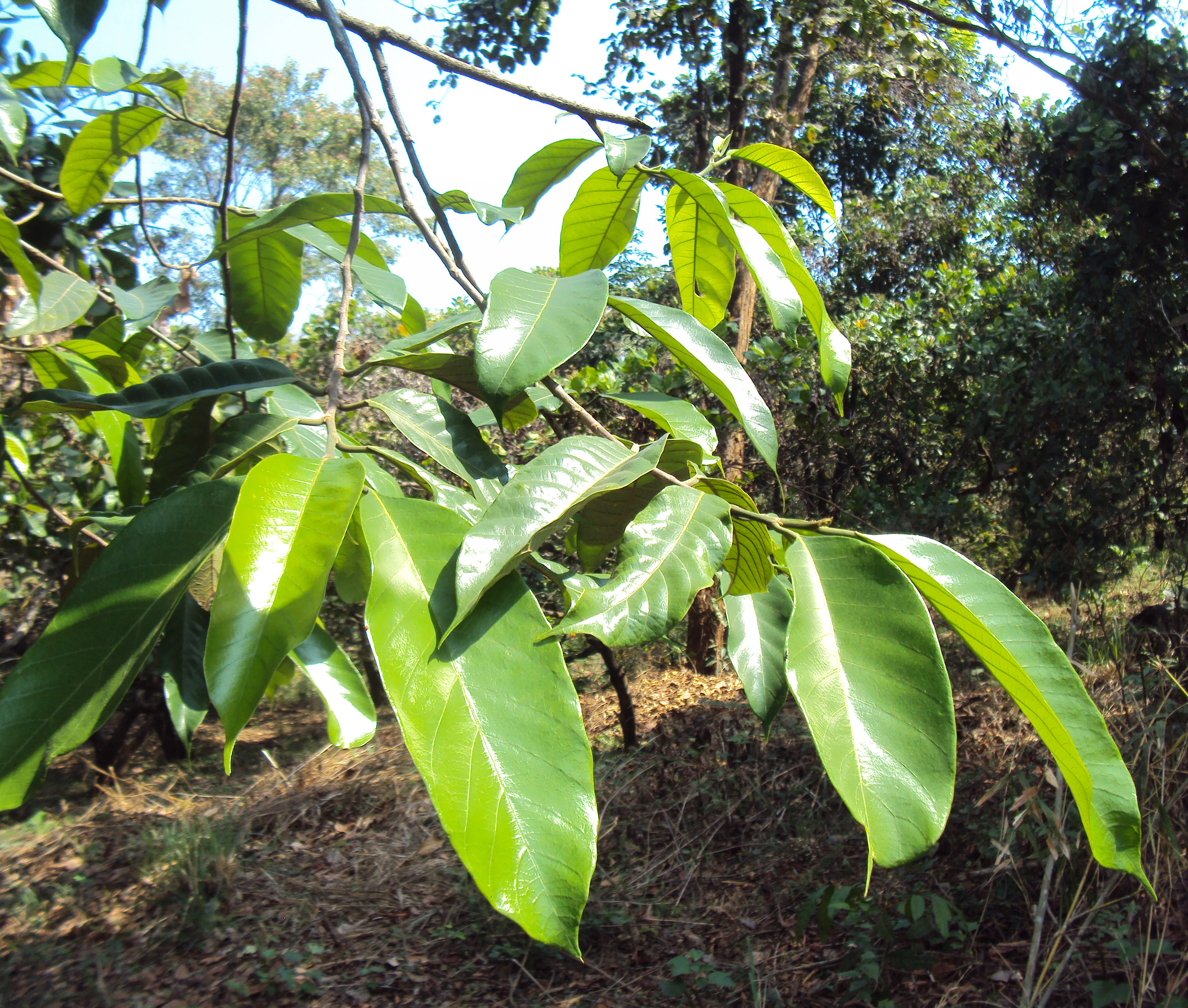

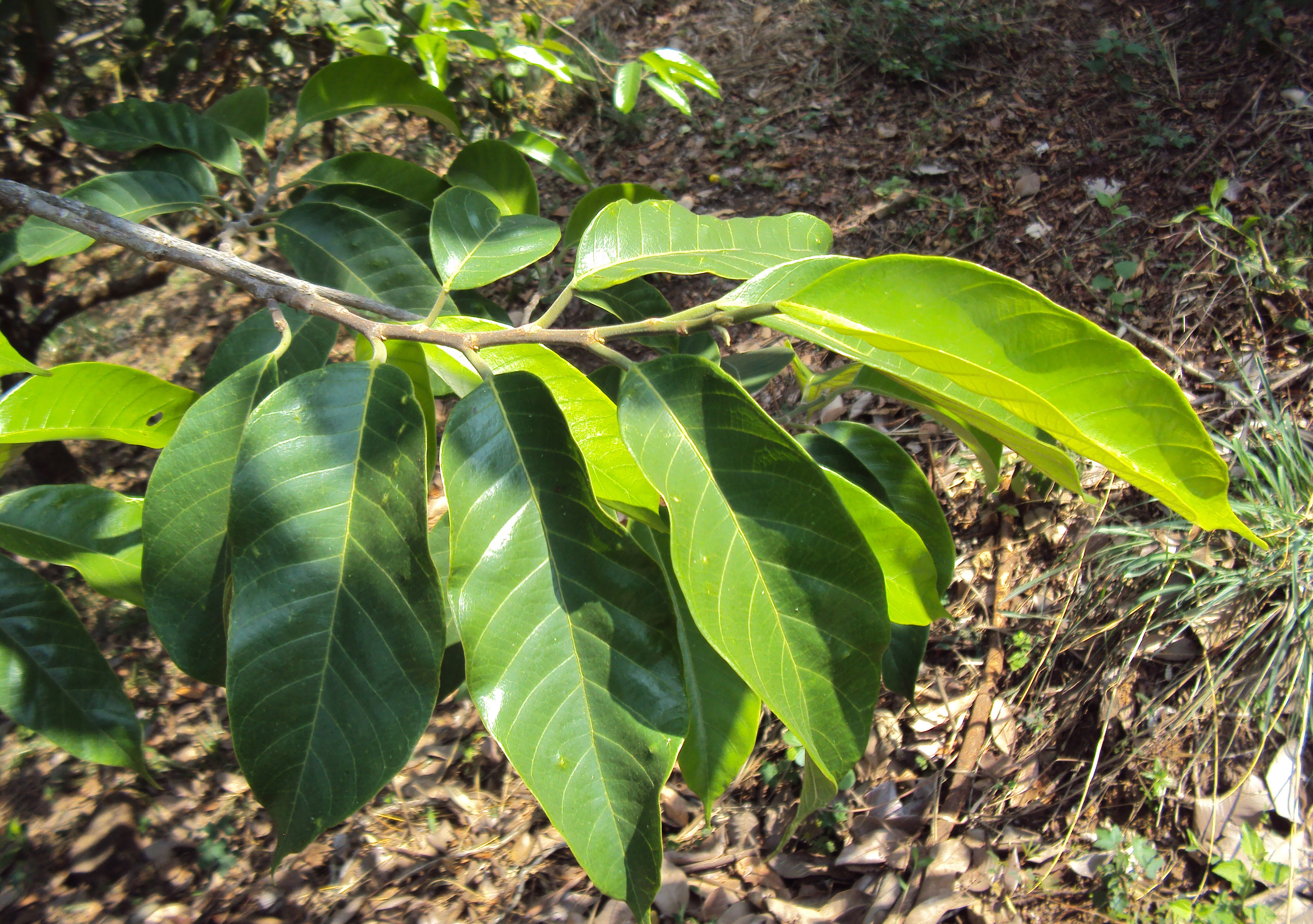

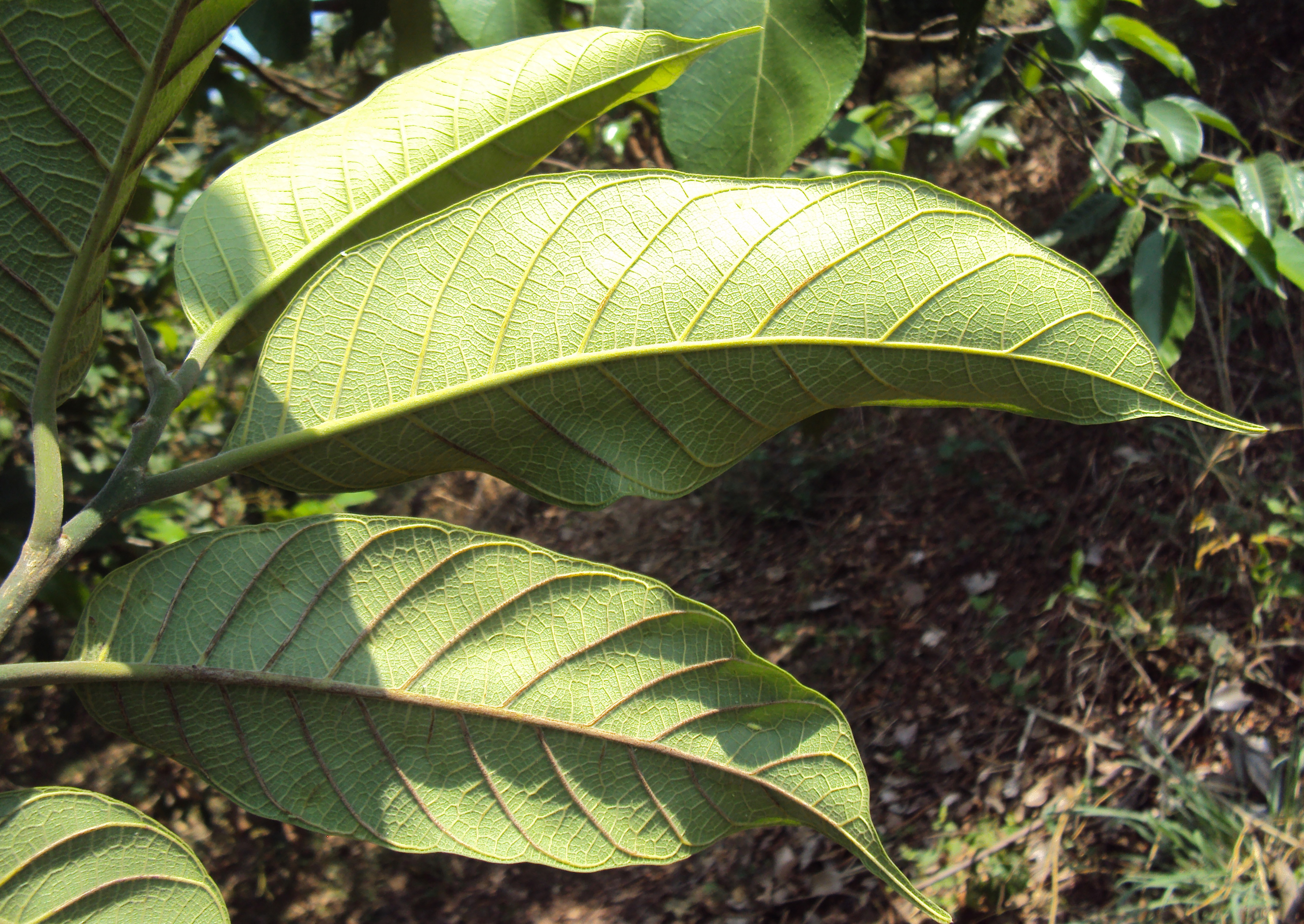
