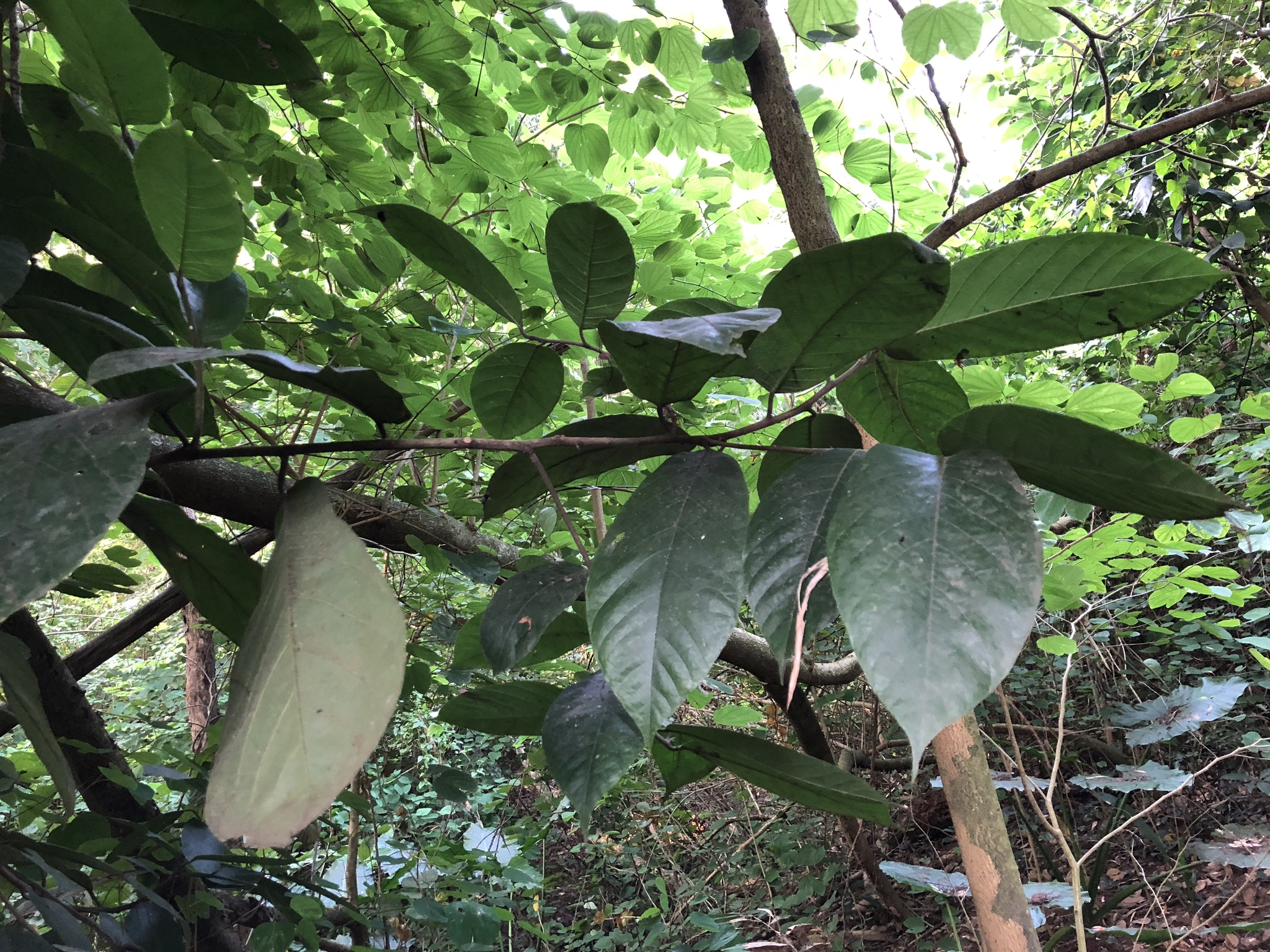
- Monkey Jack (Artocarpus rigidus) in Taiwan

Conservation status
- Least Concern (IUCN 3.1)

Scientific classification
- Kingdom: Plantae
- Clade: Embryophytes
- Clade: Tracheophytes
- Clade: Angiosperms
- Clade: Eudicots
- Clade: Rosids
- Order: Rosales
- Family: Moraceae
- Genus: Artocarpus
- Species: A. rigidus

Binomial name
- Artocarpus rigidus Blume

Synonyms
- Artocarpus cuspidatus Griff.; Artocarpus dimorphophyllus Miq.; Artocarpus dimorphophyllus var. macrophyllus Miq.; Artocarpus echinatus Roxb.; Artocarpus kertau Zoll. ex Miq.; Artocarpus muricatus Hunter ex Ridl.; Artocarpus rotundus (Houtt.) Panz.; Artocarpus varians Miq.; Radermachia rotunda Houtt., nom. utique rej.; Saccus dimorphophyllus (Miq.) Kuntze; Saccus kertau (Zoll. ex Miq.) Kuntze; Saccus rigidus (Blume) Kuntze; Saccus varians (Miq.) Kuntze

= Artocarpus rigidus =

Species of flowering plant

Artocarpus rigidus is a tree species in the family Moraceae that was described by Carl Ludwig Blume. A. rigidus is a wild species of the breadfruit/jackfruit genus (Artocarpus) and may be referred to as monkey jack. Its Vietnamese name is mít nài (sometimes da xóp). It is a large tree native to Indochina and Malesia, where it grows in lowland tropical evergreen moist forest up to 1,000 metres elevation.

A subspecies, A. rigidus subsp. asperulus (Gagnep.) F.M.Jarrett, is accepted by some authorities. Plants of the World Online treats it as a synonym of Artocarpus calophyllus J.N.Haage & E.Schmidt.
