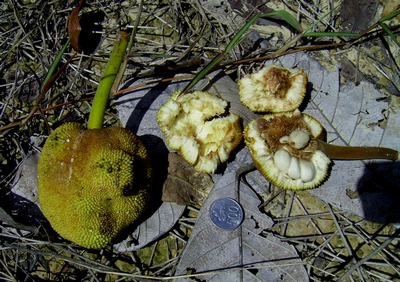

Conservation status
- Near Threatened (IUCN 3.1)

Scientific classification
- Kingdom: Plantae
- Clade: Tracheophytes
- Clade: Angiosperms
- Clade: Eudicots
- Clade: Rosids
- Order: Rosales
- Family: Moraceae
- Genus: Artocarpus
- Species: A. odoratissimus

Binomial name
- Artocarpus odoratissimus Blanco

Synonyms
- Artocarpus mutabilis Becc.; Artocarpus tarap Becc.

= Artocarpus odoratissimus =

Species of flowering plant

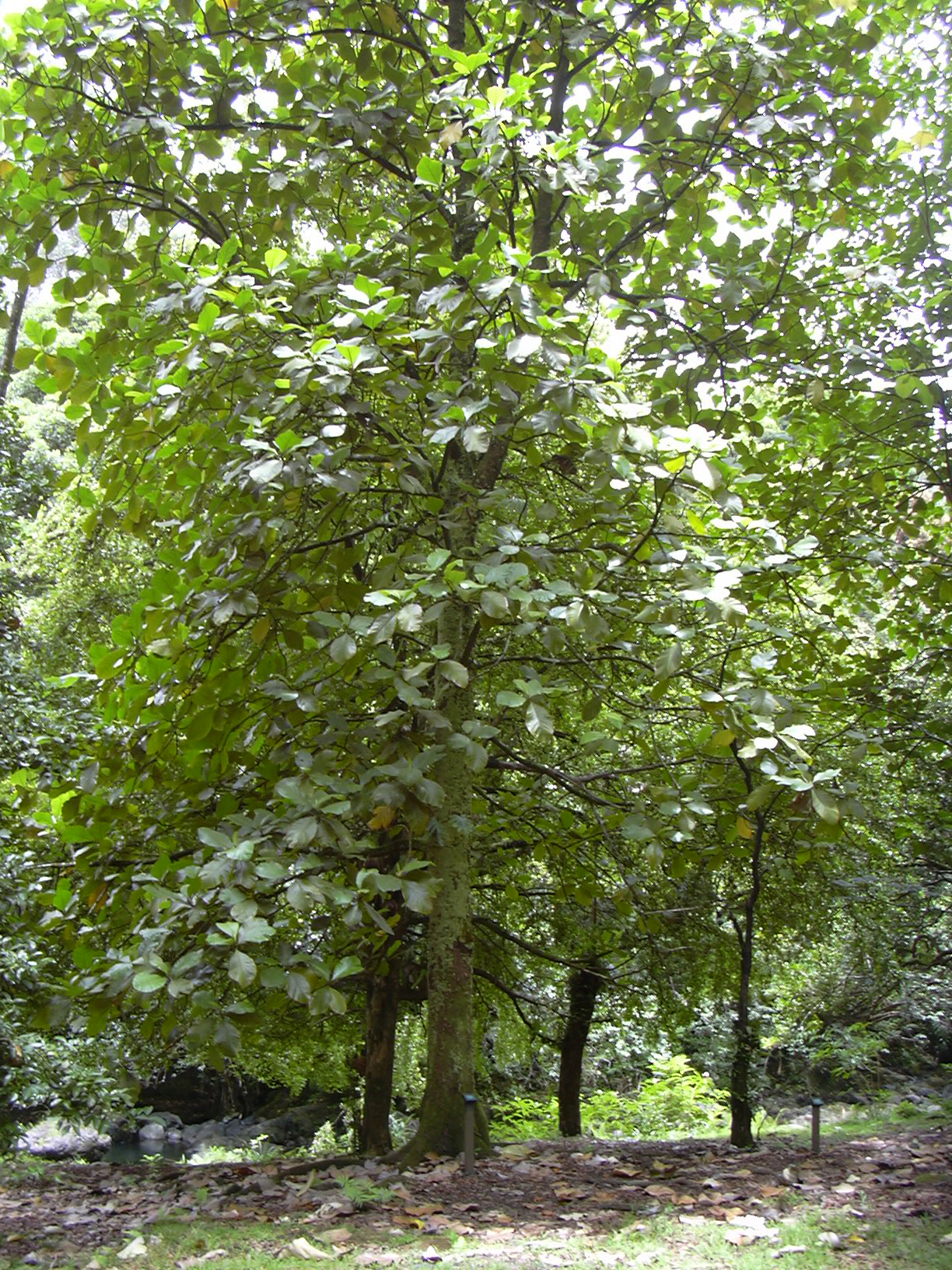
The tree of A. odoratissimus

Artocarpus odoratissimus, commonly known as marang, tarap, terap or less common, johey oak, is a species of flowering plant in the Moraceae family. It is native to Borneo from where has been introduced to the Philippines. It is closely related to the jackfruit, cempedak, and breadfruit trees which all belong to the same genus, Artocarpus.

== Description ==
Artocarpus odoratissimus is an evergreen tree growing to 25 metres (82 ft) tall. The leaves are 16–50 cm (6–20 in) long and 11–28 cm (4–11 in) broad, similar to the breadfruit's, but are a little less lobed. Many trees lose the leaf lobing once mature.

=== Fruit ===
As indicated by the scientific name, the fruit has a strong scent, and is considered superior in flavour to both jackfruit and cempedak. The scent reminds some of the durian but is not so intense, and is in the thick skin and not the fruit pulp. The pungent scent (almost chemical like scent) is in the outer rind. The taste has hints of a mild creamy, almost juicy annona-longan like texture with hints of the jackfruit/cempedak taste and there's a mild hint aftertaste (similar to the pungent outer rind, far much milder), and is best when not allowed to ripen thoroughly on the tree. Those ripened on the tree turn a more brownish color and will eventually fall to the ground and easily split open.

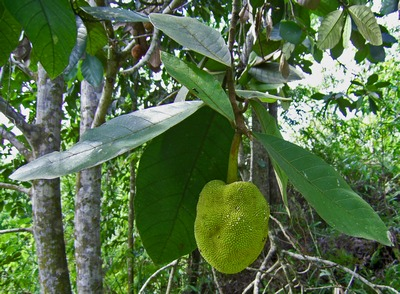
Fruit and foliage

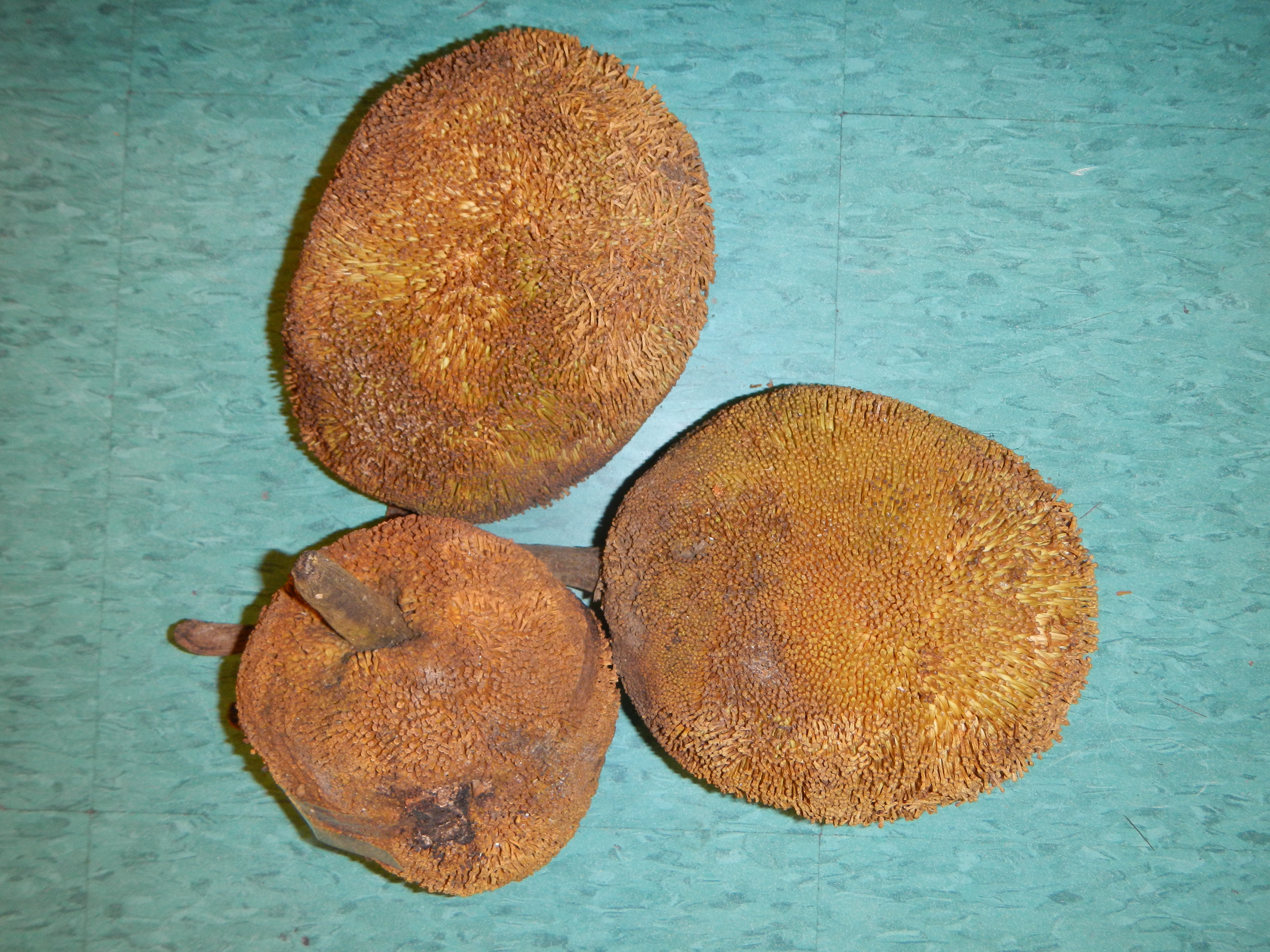
Ripe fruits (Philippines)

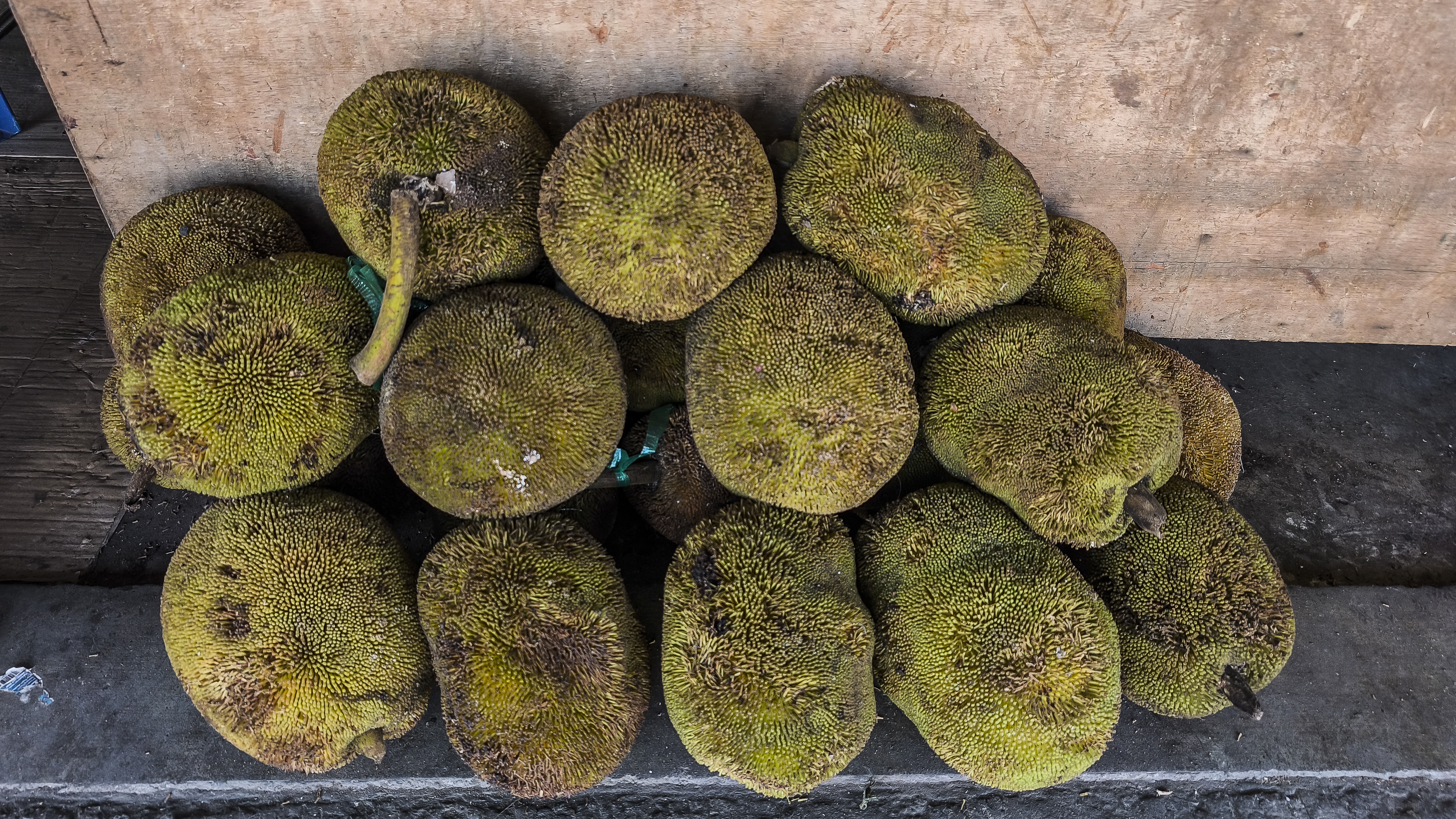
Marang sold within Kadayawan Village in Magsaysay Park. August 2026. (Philippines)

The appearance of the fruit can be regarded as an intermediate shape between the jackfruit and the breadfruit. It is round to oblong, 15–20 cm (6–8 in) long and 13 cm (5 in) broad, and weighing about 1 kg (2 lb). The thick rind is covered with soft, broad spines. They become hard and brittle as the fruit matures. When fully mature the expanding arils stretch the outer rind which often appears lumpy, especially if not all seeds were pollinated. The fruit does not fall to the ground until over-ripe. It may be harvested when full size but still firm, and left to ripen until soft. Fruits change colour to greenish yellow when ripe. The ripe fruit is opened by cutting the rind around, twisting and gently pulling. If overripe they are simply pulled apart. The interior of the fruit is somewhat similar to the jackfruit's, but the color is white and the flesh is usually softer. The core is relatively large, but there are far fewer "rags" and less non-edible parts. Arils are white and the size of a grape, each containing a 15 mm × 8 mm (1/2 in × 1/4 in) seed. Once opened, the fruit should be consumed quickly as it loses flavour rapidly and oxidizes. The seeds are also edible after boiling or roasting.

== Cultivation ==
Artocarpus odoratissimus is cultivated for its fruit in Brunei, Indonesia, Malaysia, the Philippines, southern Thailand and India (Tripura). The species is largely grown for local consumption; the short shelf-life of the fruit limits its wider use.

The tree is not cold tolerant (as is the breadfruit). It can grow between latitude 15° north and south, and in coastal regions where temperatures never stay under 7 °C (45 °F).

== Similar fruits ==
The fruits of Artocarpus sericicarpus (known as the peluntan, gumihan, pedalai, or tarap bulu) and Artocarpus sarawakensis (pingan or mountain tarap) are very similar to, and often confused with A. odoratissimus. Both these species are native to the same areas. However, they are still distinguishable based on their appearances when ripe. Artocarpus sericicarpus has hairs, like a large rambutan, and ripens bright orange. Artocarpus sarawakensis is even trickier, because it is the shape of A. odoratissimus, and it is orange. It has smaller kernel sections.

== Uses ==
There are many uses of the leftover Artocarpus odoratissimus peels, stem axis and seeds. The peels were reported as useful material for the removal of colouring agents (such as crystal violet, methyl violet 2B and methylene blue) from dye wastewater. The tarap stem axis were reported to be used in the removal of cadmium(II) and copper(II).

== See also ==
- Domesticated plants and animals of Austronesia

== Sources ==
- FAO.org: Under-utilized tropical fruits
- Artocarpus odoratissimus Marang/Tarap — with pictures of the fruit
