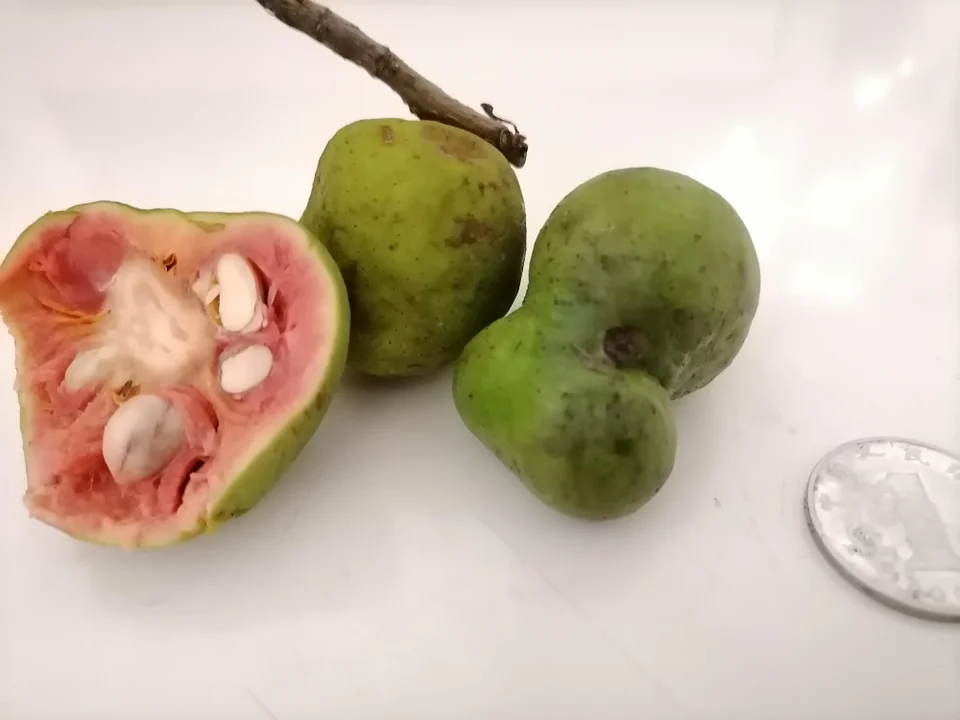
- Artocarpus parvus fruit, somewhat unripe

Conservation status
- Vulnerable (IUCN 3.1)

Scientific classification
- Kingdom: Plantae
- Clade: Tracheophytes
- Clade: Angiosperms
- Clade: Eudicots
- Clade: Rosids
- Order: Rosales
- Family: Moraceae
- Genus: Artocarpus
- Species: A. parvus

Binomial name
- Artocarpus parvus Gagnep.

Synonyms
- Artocarpus lignanensis Merr.; Artocarpus nitidus subsp. lignanensis Merr.; Artocarpus sampor Gagnep.

= Artocarpus parvus =

Species of plant

Artocarpus parvus, commonly known as kwai muk, is a species of flowering plant in the family Moraceae. It a tree native to Indo-China and southern China. The species is distinguished by the dark-red and rough bark of the tree. The fruit have a yellow-orange and velutinous peel, while the pulp is pink-orange.
