= AIDS (disambiguation) =

AIDS, or acquired immunodeficiency syndrome, is a spectrum of conditions caused by HIV infection.

AIDS, aids, or Aids may also refer to:

== Arts, entertainment and media ==
- AIDS (journal), about HIV and AIDS
- Astro Investigation and Defence Service, a fictional organisation in the film Bad Taste

== Science and medicine ==
- Autoinflammatory diseases, a group of disorders of the innate immune system

== Technology ==
- AIDS (aeronautics) (Aircraft Integrated Data System), an aircraft system
- AIDS (computer virus), a DOS computer virus
- AIDS (Trojan horse), a trojan horse malware targeting DOS systems

== Other uses ==
- Aid, a voluntary transfer of resources from one country to another
- Almost ideal demand system, a consumer demand model in industrial organization
- Riding aids, the cues given by riders to their horses

== See also ==
- Aid (disambiguation)
- Aides (disambiguation)
- Ayds, an appetite-suppressant candy
- HIV (human immunodeficiency virus)
