= Aid (disambiguation) =

Aid is the voluntary transfer of resources from one country to another.

Aid or AID may also refer to:

== Assistance and funding ==
- Development aid, financial aid to support the development of developing countries
- Humanitarian aid, material and logistic assistance to people who need help
- Welfare spending, social aid to poor people
- First aid, assistance given to a person suffering a sudden illness or injury
- Charity (practice), voluntary giving of aid and to those in need

== People ==
- Aid (rapper) (born 1990), stagename of Aida Alonso Iglesias, a Spanish rap singer
- George Charles Aid (1872–1938), American painter
- Matthew Aid (1958–2018), American military historian and author

== Science and technology ==
=== Biology and medicine ===
- Activation-induced cytidine deaminase, an enzyme
- Amputee identity disorder, now more commonly known as "body integrity identity disorder", a controversial psychological and neurological mental disorder
- Artificial insemination by donor, a type of human artificial insemination
- Autoimmune disease, a disorder with an overactive immune response of the body

=== Other uses in science and technology ===
- Algebraic interpretive dialogue, an implementation of JOSS II for the PDP-10
- Automatic interaction detection, a precursor to, and component of chi-square automatic interaction detection
- Application identifier, in the EMV payment card chip standard

== Other uses ==
- Aid (Würm), a river in Germany
- Aid, Missouri, a community in the US
- Americans for Informed Democracy, an American non-profit organization
- Association for India's Development, an American/Indian non-profit organization

== See also ==
- Feudal aid, feudal taxation
- AIDS, Acquired immunodeficiency syndrome
- USAID, United States Agency for International Development
- Aide (disambiguation)
- AIDS (disambiguation)
- Assistance (disambiguation)
- Eid (disambiguation)
- Help (disambiguation)
