= Assistance =

Assistance is an act of helping behavior.

Assistance may also refer to:

== Types of help ==
- Aid, in international relations, a voluntary transfer of resources from one country to another
- Assistance dog, a dog trained to aid or assist a person with a disability
- Consular assistance, help and advice provided by the diplomatic agents of a country to citizens of that country who are living or traveling overseas
- Development assistance, financial aid given to support the development of developing countries
- Directory assistance, a phone service used to find out a specific telephone number and/or address
- Financial assistance (disambiguation), multiple forms
- General Assistance, in the United States, welfare programs that benefit adults without dependents
- Humanitarian assistance, material or logistical assistance provided for humanitarian purposes
- Judicial assistance, admittance and enforcement of a judicial order by a court from one jurisdiction to a court in another jurisdiction
- Operation Assistance, military support to the civil authorities during the flooding of the Red River in April and May 1997
- Operator assistance, a service to assist the calling party placing a telephone call
- Roadside assistance, a service that provides assistance to motorists, or bicyclists, whose vehicles have suffered a mechanical failure
- Social assistance, welfare
- Travel assistance, a service which provides help, primarily in medical emergencies during travel
- User assistance, guided assistance to a user of a software product
- Virtual assistance, a service by independent entrepreneurs who work remotely and use technology to deliver services to clients globally
- Wind assistance, a term in track and field, which refers to the wind level during a race or event
- Windows Remote Assistance, a feature of Windows XP and later that allows a user to temporarily view or control a remote Windows computer
- Writ of assistance, a written order issued by a court instructing a law enforcement official to perform a certain task

== Groups and organizations ==
- Britebound, a non-profit organization whose mission is to help students successfully complete the financing and repayment of higher education
- Civil Assistance, 1970s British civil defence group
- Polish Assistance, also known as "Bratnia Pomoc", is a charitable foundation based in New York City

== Other uses ==
- Assistance (play), a 2008 play written by Leslye Headland
- Assistance Bay, a small bay forming the head of Possession Bay
- HMS Assistance, a ship

== See also ==
- Aide (disambiguation)
- Assist (disambiguation)
- Assistant (disambiguation)
- Help (disambiguation)
