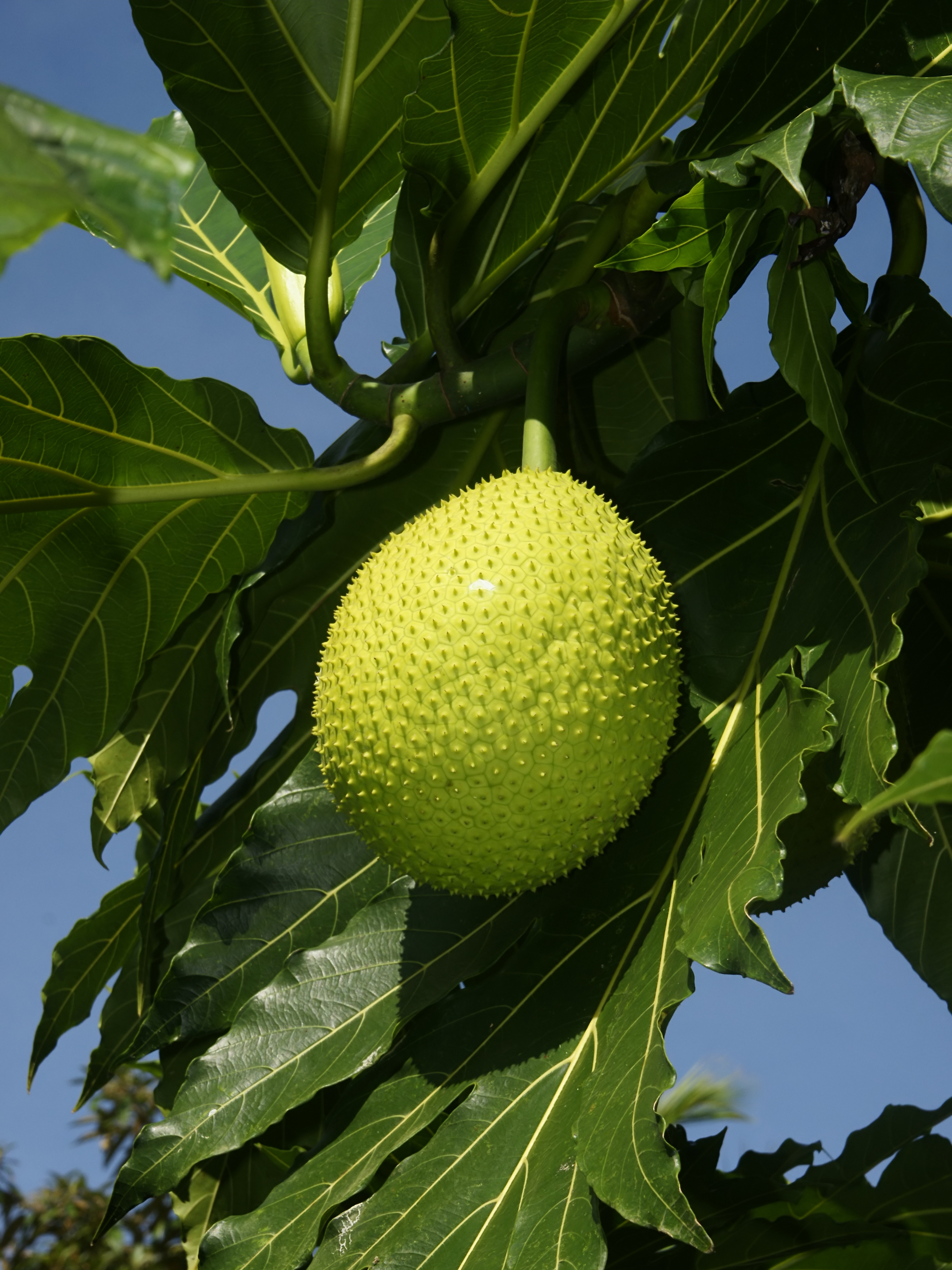
- Breadfruit at Tortuguero, Costa Rica

Conservation status
- Data Deficient (IUCN 3.1)

Scientific classification
- Kingdom: Plantae
- Clade: Tracheophytes
- Clade: Angiosperms
- Clade: Eudicots
- Clade: Rosids
- Order: Rosales
- Family: Moraceae
- Genus: Artocarpus
- Species: A. altilis

Binomial name
- Artocarpus altilis (Parkinson) Fosberg

Synonyms
- Artocarpus altilis var. non-seminiferus (Duss) Fournet; Artocarpus communis J.R.Forst. & G.Forst.; Artocarpus incisifolius Stokes, nom. illeg. superfl.; Artocarpus incisifolius var. apyrenus Stokes, nom. illeg. superfl.; Artocarpus incisus (Thunb.) L.f.; Artocarpus incisus var. laevis (Hassk.) Miq.; Artocarpus incisus var. non-seminifer Duss; Artocarpus laevis Hassk.; Artocarpus rima Blanco; Radermachia incisa Thunb.; Saccus communis (J.R.Forst. & G.Forst.) Kuntze; Saccus laevis Kuntze; Sitodium altile Parkinson

= Breadfruit =

Edible fruit-bearing tree

Breadfruit (Artocarpus altilis) is a species of flowering tree in the mulberry and jackfruit family Moraceae. Its name is derived from the texture of the moderately ripe fruit when cooked, similar to freshly baked bread and having a potato-like flavor.

Breadfruit was spread into Oceania via the Austronesian expansion and is believed to have been selectively bred in Polynesia from the breadnut (Artocarpus camansi). British and French navigators introduced a few Polynesian seedless varieties to Caribbean islands during the late 18th century. Today it is widely grown in tropical regions throughout South and Southeast Asia, the Pacific and Caribbean islands, lowland Central America, northern South America and Africa.

In addition to the fruit serving as a staple food in many cultures, the light, sturdy timber of breadfruit has been used for making furniture, houses, and surfboards.

Breadfruit is closely related to A. camansi (breadnut or seeded breadfruit) of New Guinea, the Maluku Islands, and the Philippines, A. blancoi (tipolo or antipolo) of the Philippines, and more distantly, A. mariannensis (dugdug) of Micronesia, species that are also sometimes called "breadfruit." It is also closely related to the jackfruit.

== Description ==
Breadfruit trees grow to a height of 26 m (85 ft). The large and thick leaves are deeply cut into pinnate lobes. All parts of the tree yield latex, which is useful for boat caulking.

The trees are monoecious, with male and female flowers growing on the same tree. The male flowers emerge first, followed shortly afterward by the female flowers. The latter grow into capitula, which are capable of pollination just three days later. Pollination occurs mainly by fruit bats, but cultivated varieties produce fruit without pollination. The compound, false fruit develops from the swollen perianth, and originates from 1,500 to 2,000 flowers visible on the skin of the fruit as hexagon-like disks.

Breadfruit is one of the highest-yielding food plants, with a single tree producing up to 200 or more grapefruit-sized fruits per season, requiring limited care. In the South Pacific, the trees yield 50 to 150 fruits per year, usually round, oval, or oblong, and weighing 0.25 to 6.0 kg (0.55 to 13 lb). Productivity varies between wet and dry areas. Studies in Barbados indicate a reasonable potential of 15 to 30 t/ha (6.7 to 13.4 short ton/acre). The ovoid fruit has a rough surface, and each fruit is divided into many achenes, each surrounded by a fleshy perianth and growing on a fleshy receptacle. Most selectively bred cultivars have seedless fruit, whereas seeded varieties are grown mainly for their edible seeds. Breadfruit is usually propagated using root cuttings.

Breadfruit is closely related to the breadnut. It is similar in appearance to its relative of the same genus, the jackfruit (Artocarpus heterophyllus). The closely related Artocarpus camansi can be distinguished from A. altilis by having spinier fruits with numerous seeds. Artocarpus mariannensis can be distinguished by having dark green, elongated fruits with darker yellow flesh, as well as entire or shallowly lobed leaves.

=== Propagation ===
Breadfruit is propagated mainly by seeds, though seedless cultivars can be propagated by transplanting suckers that grow from the surface roots of the tree. The roots can be deliberately injured to induce the growth of suckers, which are then separated from the root and planted in a pot or directly transplanted into the ground. Pruning also induces sucker growth. Sucker cuttings are placed in plastic bags containing a mixture of soil, peat, and sand, and kept in the shade while moistened with liquid fertilizer. Once roots have developed, the transplant is put in full sun until it is ready for planting in the orchard.

For large-scale propagation, root cuttings are preferred, with segments about 10 cm (2 in) thick and 20 cm (9 in) long. Roots may take up to 5 months to develop, with the young trees ready for planting when they are 60 cm (2 ft) high.

=== Etymology and common names ===
The term "breadfruit" was first used in the 17th century to describe the bread-like texture of the fruit when baked. Breadfruit has hundreds of varieties and numerous common names varying by its geographic distribution.

== Taxonomy ==
According to DNA fingerprinting studies, the seeded wild ancestor of breadfruit is the breadnut (A. camansi), which is native to New Guinea, the Maluku Islands, and the Philippines.

A. camansi was domesticated and selectively bred in Polynesia, giving rise to the mostly seedless A. altilis. Micronesian breadfruit also show evidence of hybridization with the native A. mariannensis, while most Polynesian and Melanesian cultivars do not. This indicates that Micronesia was initially colonized separately from Polynesia and Melanesia through two different migration events, later coinciding in eastern Micronesia.

Breadfruit was one of the canoe plants spread by Austronesian voyagers around 3,000 years ago into Micronesia, Melanesia, and Polynesia, where it was not native.

== Distribution and habitat ==
Extent of the Austronesian expansion that carried crops like breadfruit, bananas, and coconuts throughout the Indo-Pacific islands

Breadfruit is an equatorial, lowland species. It has been spread from its Pacific source to many tropical regions.

In 1769, Joseph Banks was stationed in Tahiti as part of the Endeavour expedition commanded by Captain James Cook. The late-18th-century quest for cheap, high-energy food sources for slaves in British colonies prompted colonial administrators and plantation owners to call for breadfruit to be brought to the Caribbean. As president of the Royal Society, Banks provided a cash bounty and gold medal for success in this endeavor and successfully lobbied for a British Naval expedition. After an unsuccessful voyage to the South Pacific to collect the plants as commander of HMS Bounty, in 1791, William Bligh commanded a second expedition with Providence and Assistant, which collected seedless breadfruit plants in Tahiti and transported these to St. Helena in the Atlantic and St. Vincent and Jamaica in the West Indies.

The plant grows best at elevations below 650 m (2,130 ft), but is found at elevations of 1,550 m (5,090 ft). Its preferred soils are neutral to alkaline (pH of 6.1–7.4) and either sand, sandy loam, loam, or sandy clay loam. Breadfruit is able to grow in coral sands and saline soils. The breadfruit is ultra-tropical, requiring a temperature range of 16–38 °C (61–100 °F) and an annual rainfall of 2,000–2,500 mm (80–100 in).

== Nutrition ==
Breadfruit, raw
Nutritional value per 100 g (3.5 oz)
- Energy: 431 kJ (103 kcal)
- Carbohydrates: 27.12 g
- Sugars: 11 g
- Dietary fiber: 4.9 g
- Fat: 0.23 g
- Protein: 1.07 g
Vitamins and minerals
Vitamins	Quantity %DV^{†}
Vitamin A equiv. lutein zeaxanthin	22 μg
Thiamine (B1)	9% 0.11 mg
Riboflavin (B2)	2% 0.03 mg
Niacin (B3)	6% 0.9 mg
Pantothenic acid (B5)	9% 0.457 mg
Vitamin B6	6% 0.1 mg
Folate (B9)	4% 14 μg
Choline	2% 9.8 mg
Vitamin C	32% 29 mg
Vitamin E	1% 0.1 mg
Vitamin K	0% 0.5 μg
Minerals	Quantity %DV^{†}
Calcium	1% 17 mg
Iron	3% 0.54 mg
Magnesium	6% 25 mg
Manganese	3% 0.06 mg
Phosphorus	2% 30 mg
Potassium	16% 490 mg
Sodium	0% 2 mg
Zinc	1% 0.12 mg
- Other constituents: Quantity
- Water: 70.65 g
- Full Link to USDA Database entry
- ^{†}Percentages estimated using US recommendations for adults, except for potassium, which is estimated based on expert recommendation from the National Academies.

Breadfruit is 71% water, 27% carbohydrates, and 1% protein, and contains negligible fat (table). In a reference amount of 100 g (3.5 oz), raw breadfruit supplies 103 calories, is a rich source of vitamin C (32% of the Daily Value, DV), and provides a moderate source of potassium (16% DV), with no other nutrients in significant content.

== Uses ==
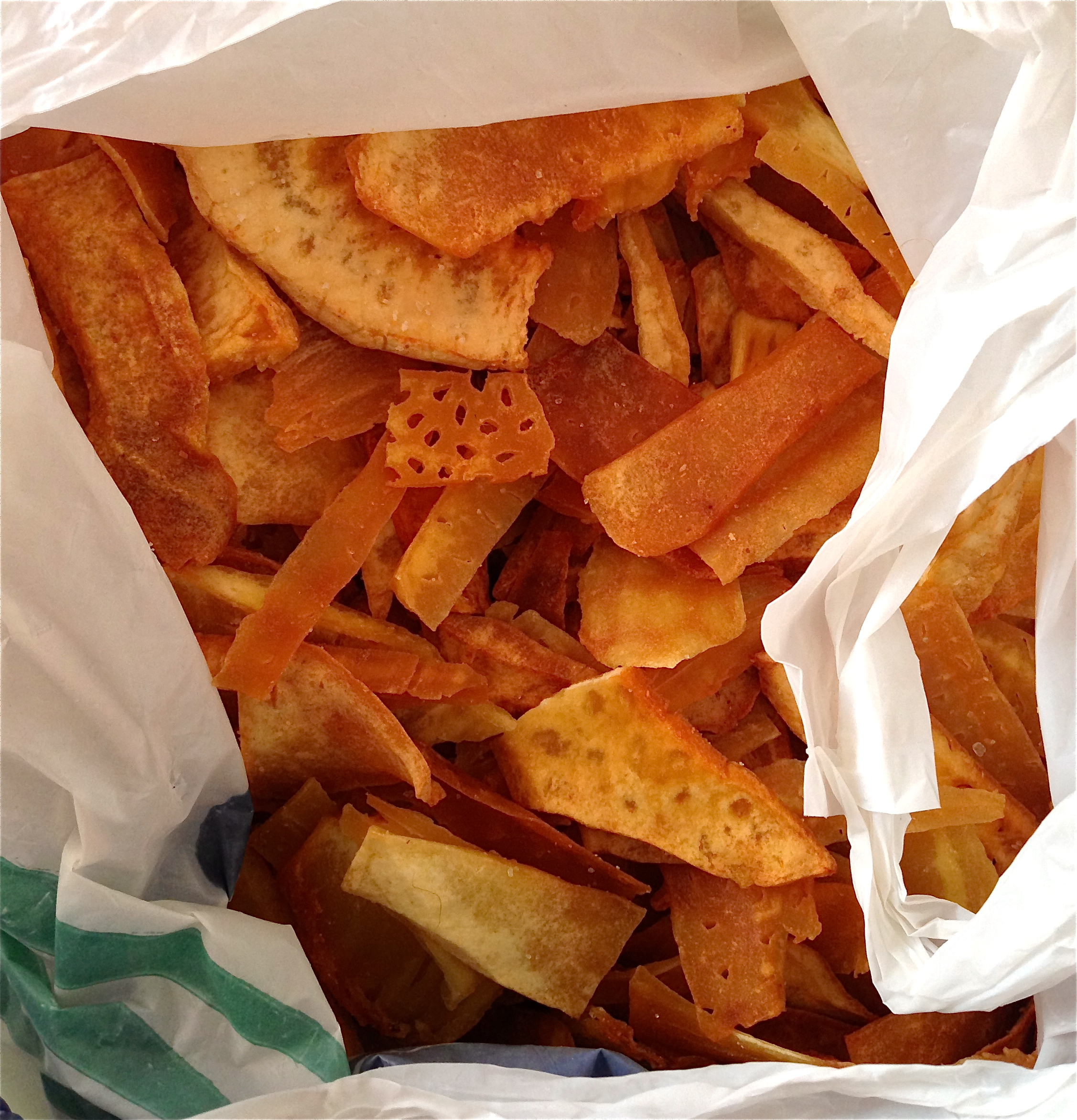
Sliced and fried breadfruit

=== Food ===
Breadfruit is a staple food in many tropical regions. Most breadfruit varieties produce fruit throughout the year. Both ripe and unripe fruit have culinary uses; unripe breadfruit is cooked before consumption. Before being eaten, the fruit is roasted, baked, fried, or boiled. When cooked, the taste of moderately ripe breadfruit is described as potato-like, or similar to freshly baked bread.

One breadfruit tree can produce 200 kilograms (450 lb) each season. Because breadfruit trees usually produce large crops at certain times of the year, the preservation of harvested fruit is an issue. One traditional preservation technique known throughout Oceania is to bury peeled and washed fruits in a leaf-lined pit, where they ferment over several weeks and produce a sour, sticky paste (masi in Samoa and Tonga, māhi in Tahiti, mā in the Carolines). Stored in this way, the product may endure a year or more. Some pits are reported to have produced edible contents more than 20 years after burial. Remnants of pit-like formations with stone scattered around (presumed to line them) are often clues indicating prehistoric settlement to archaeologists studying precontact history of French Polynesia.

In addition to being edible raw, breadfruit can be dried and ground into flour and the seeds can be cooked for consumption.

==== Southeast Asia, Pacific Islands and Madagascar ====
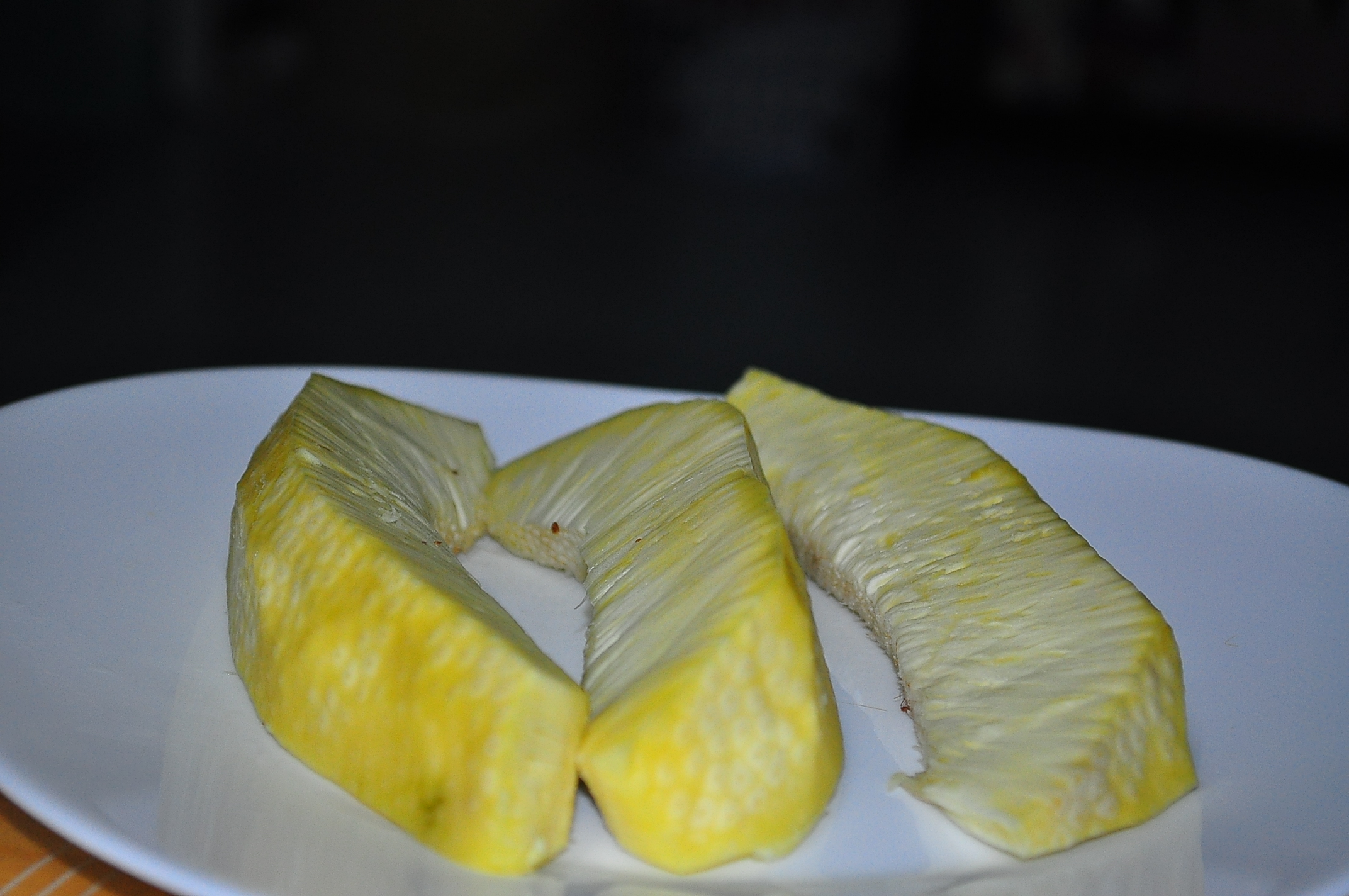
Breadfruit (kolo) slices to be used for cooking in Filipino cuisine

The seedless breadfruit is found in Brunei, Indonesia, and Malaysia, where it is called sukun. It is commonly made into fritters and eaten as snacks. Breadfruit fritters are sold as local street food.

In the Philippines, breadfruit is known as rimas in Tagalog and kolo in the Visayan languages. It is also called kamansi (also spelled camansi), along with the closely related Artocarpus camansi, and the endemic Artocarpus blancoi (tipolo or antipolo). All three species, as well as the closely related jackfruit, are commonly used much in the same way in savory dishes. The immature fruits are most commonly eaten as ginataang rimas (cooked with coconut milk).

In the Hawaiian staple food called poi, the traditional ingredient of mashed taro root can be replaced by, or augmented with, mashed breadfruit (ʻulu in Hawaiian). The resulting "breadfruit poi" is called poi ʻulu.

==== South Asia ====
In India, fritters of breadfruit called paatponnos/nirponnos in Kannada, Jeegujje or "Deevihalasu" in Konkani or kadachakka varuthath in Malayalam, are a local delicacy in coastal Goa, Karnataka and Kerala. In Seychelles, it was traditionally eaten as a substitute for rice as an accompaniment to the mains. It would either be consumed boiled (friyapen bwi) or grilled (friyapen griye) by placing it whole in the wood fire used for cooking the main meal and then taken out when ready. It is also eaten as a dessert called ladob friyapen prepared by boiling in coconut milk, sugar, vanilla, cinnamon and a pinch of salt. In Sri Lanka it is cooked as a curry using coconut milk and spices (which becomes a side dish) or boiled. Boiled breadfruit is a famous main meal. It is often consumed with scraped coconut or coconut sambol, made of scraped coconut, red chili powder, and salt mixed with a dash of lime juice. A traditional sweet snack made of finely sliced, sun-dried breadfruit chips deep-fried in coconut oil and dipped in heated treacle or sugar syrup is known as rata del petti.

==== Caribbean and Latin America ====
In Belize, the Mayan people call it masapan.

In Puerto Rico, breadfruit is called mapén, panapén or pana, for short, although the name pana is often used to refer to breadnut, seeds of which have traditionally been boiled, peeled, and eaten whole. In some inland regions, it is also called mapén and used to make pasteles and alcapurrias. Breadfruit is often served boiled with a mixture of sauteed bacalao (salted cod fish), olive oil, and onions, mostly as tostones where about 1-inch chunks are fried, lightly flattened, and fried again. Mofongo de panapén is fried breadfruit mashed with olive oil, garlic, broth, and chicharrón. Rellenos de panapén is the breadfruit version of papa rellena. Dipping sauce can be made from boiled, ripe breadfruit, similar to chutney, using spices, sesame seeds, herbs, lentil, coconut milk, and fruit. Both ripe and unripe fruit are boiled together and mashed with milk and butter to make pastelón de panapén, a dish similar to lasagna. Ripe breadfruit is used in desserts, including flan de pana (breadfruit custard). Cazuela is a crustless pie with ripe breadfruit, spices, raisins, coconut milk, and sweet potatoes. Breadfruit flour is sold all over Puerto Rico and used for making bread, pastries, cookies, pancakes, waffles, crepes, and almojábana. A Breadfruit Festival in which traditional and novel breadfruit-based dishes are sold is celebrated on the last Friday of August in Barrio Mariana, Humacao, Puerto Rico.

In the Dominican Republic, it is called buen pan or "good bread". Breadfruit is not popular in Dominican cookery and is used mainly for feeding pigs.

In Barbados, breadfruit is boiled with salted meat and mashed with butter to make breadfruit coucou. It is usually eaten with saucy meat dishes.

In Haiti, steamed breadfruit is mashed to make a dish called tonmtonm which is eaten with a sauce made with okra and other ingredients, such as fish and crab.

In Trinidad and Tobago, breadfruit is boiled, then fried and eaten with saucy meat dishes like curried duck.

In Jamaica, breadfruit is boiled in soups or roasted on stove top, in the oven or on wood coal. It is eaten with the national dish ackee and salt fish. The ripe fruit is used in salads or fried as a side dish.

In St. Vincent and the Grenadines, it is eaten boiled in soups, roasted, and fried. Roasted breadfruit, served with fried jackfish, is the country's national dish. The ripe fruit is used as a base to make drinks, cakes, and ice cream.

=== Timber and other uses ===
Breadfruit was widely used in a variety of ways among Pacific Islanders. Its lightweight wood (specific gravity of 0.27) is resistant to termites and shipworms, so it is used as timber for structures and outrigger canoes. Its wood pulp can also be used to make paper, called breadfruit tapa. The wood of the breadfruit tree was one of the most valuable timbers in the construction of traditional houses in Samoan architecture.

Breadfruit contains phytochemicals having potential as an insect repellent. The parts of the fruits that are discarded can be used to feed livestock. The leaves of breadfruit trees can also be browsed by cattle.

Breadfruit, however, exudes latex upon harvesting, causing the plant sap to adhere to the surface, leading to the staining of the epicarp. Proper methods of breadfruit harvesting usually include the process of draining the latex and disposing of it. Sticky white sap or latex is present in all parts of the breadfruit tree and has been used for glue, caulk, and even chewing gum. Native Hawaiians used its sticky latex to trap birds, whose feathers were made into cloaks.

== In culture ==
On Puluwat in the Caroline Islands, in the context of sacred yitang lore, breadfruit (poi) is a figure of speech for knowledge. This lore is organized into five categories: war, magic, meetings, navigation, and breadfruit.

According to an etiological Hawaiian myth, the breadfruit originated from the sacrifice of the war god Kū. After deciding to live secretly among mortals as a farmer, Kū married and had children. He and his family lived happily until a famine seized their island. When he could no longer bear to watch his children suffer, Kū told his wife that he could deliver them from starvation, but to do so he would have to leave them. Reluctantly she agreed, and at her word, Kū descended into the ground right where he had stood until only the top of his head was visible. His family waited around the spot he had last been, day and night, watering it with their tears until suddenly, a small green shoot appeared where Kū had stood. Quickly, the shoot grew into a tall and leafy tree that was laden with heavy breadfruits that Kū's family and neighbors gratefully ate, joyfully saved from starvation. It also known as a symbol of abundance and famine relief

Many breadfruit hybrids and cultivars are widely distributed throughout the Pacific though they are seedless or otherwise biologically incapable of naturally dispersing long distances. It is therefore clear that humans aided distribution of the plant in the Pacific, specifically prehistoric groups who colonized the Pacific Islands. To investigate the patterns of human migration throughout the Pacific, scientists have used molecular dating of breadfruit hybrids and cultivars in concert with anthropological data. Results support the west-to-east migration hypothesis, in which the Lapita people are thought to have traveled from Melanesia to numerous Polynesian islands.

The world's largest collection of breadfruit varieties was established by botanist Diane Ragone, from over 20 years' travel to 50 Pacific islands, on a 4-hectare (10-acre) plot outside of Hana, on the isolated east coast of Maui (Hawaii).

== Gallery ==
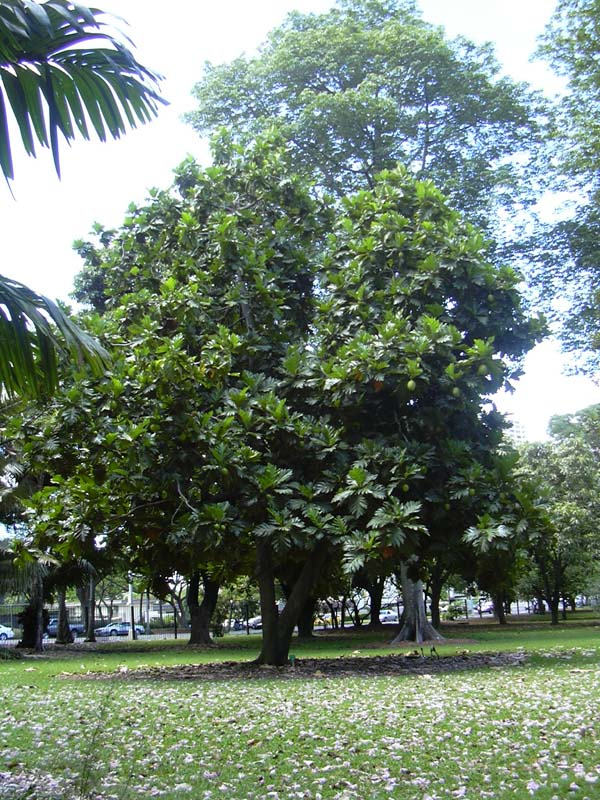
A breadfruit tree in Honolulu, Hawaii

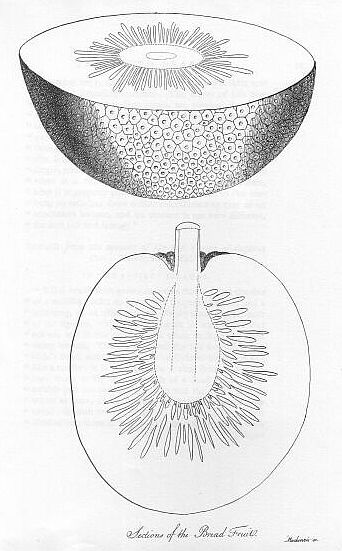
Sections of a breadfruit

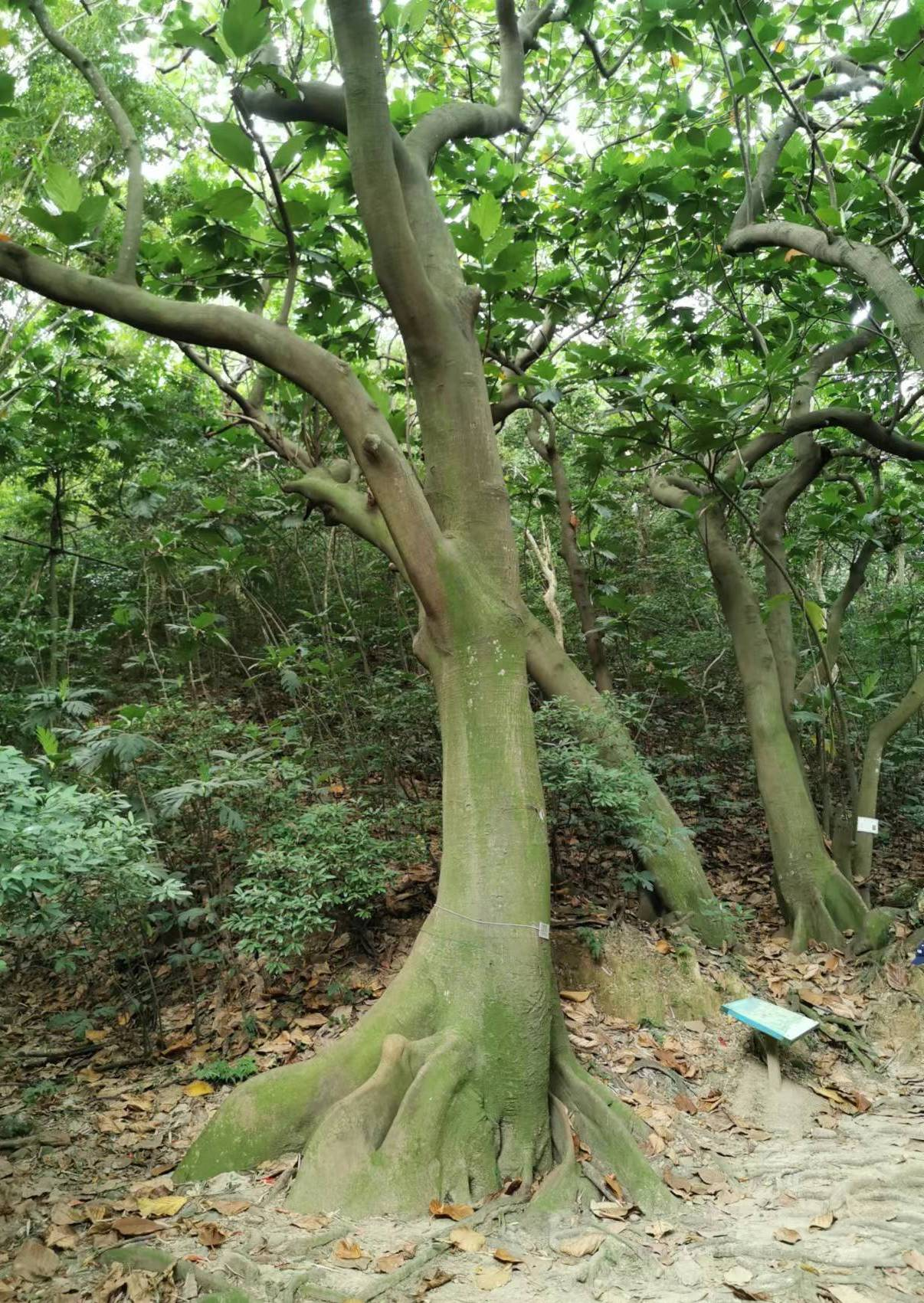
Form of the buttress root

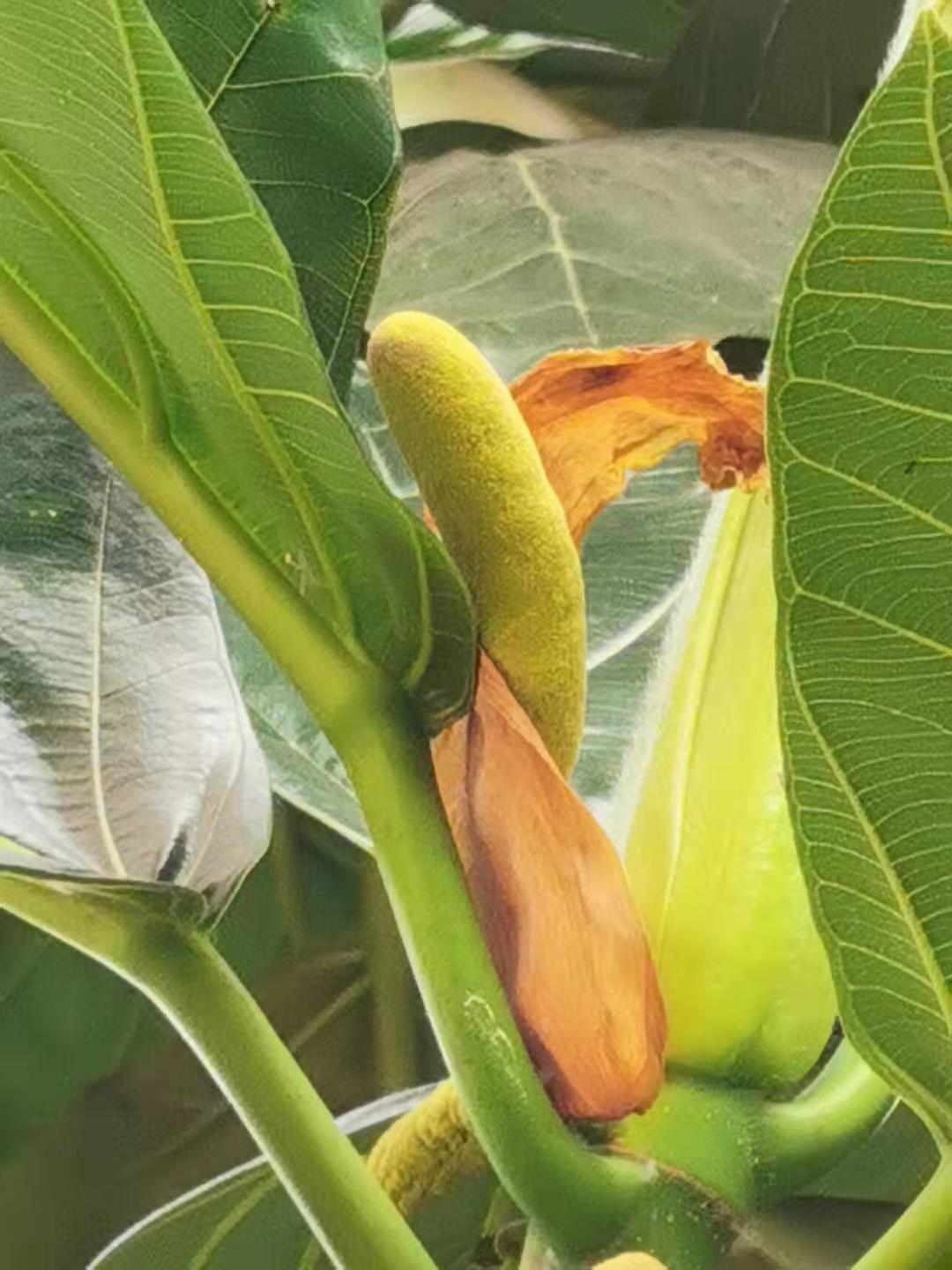
Male inflorescence

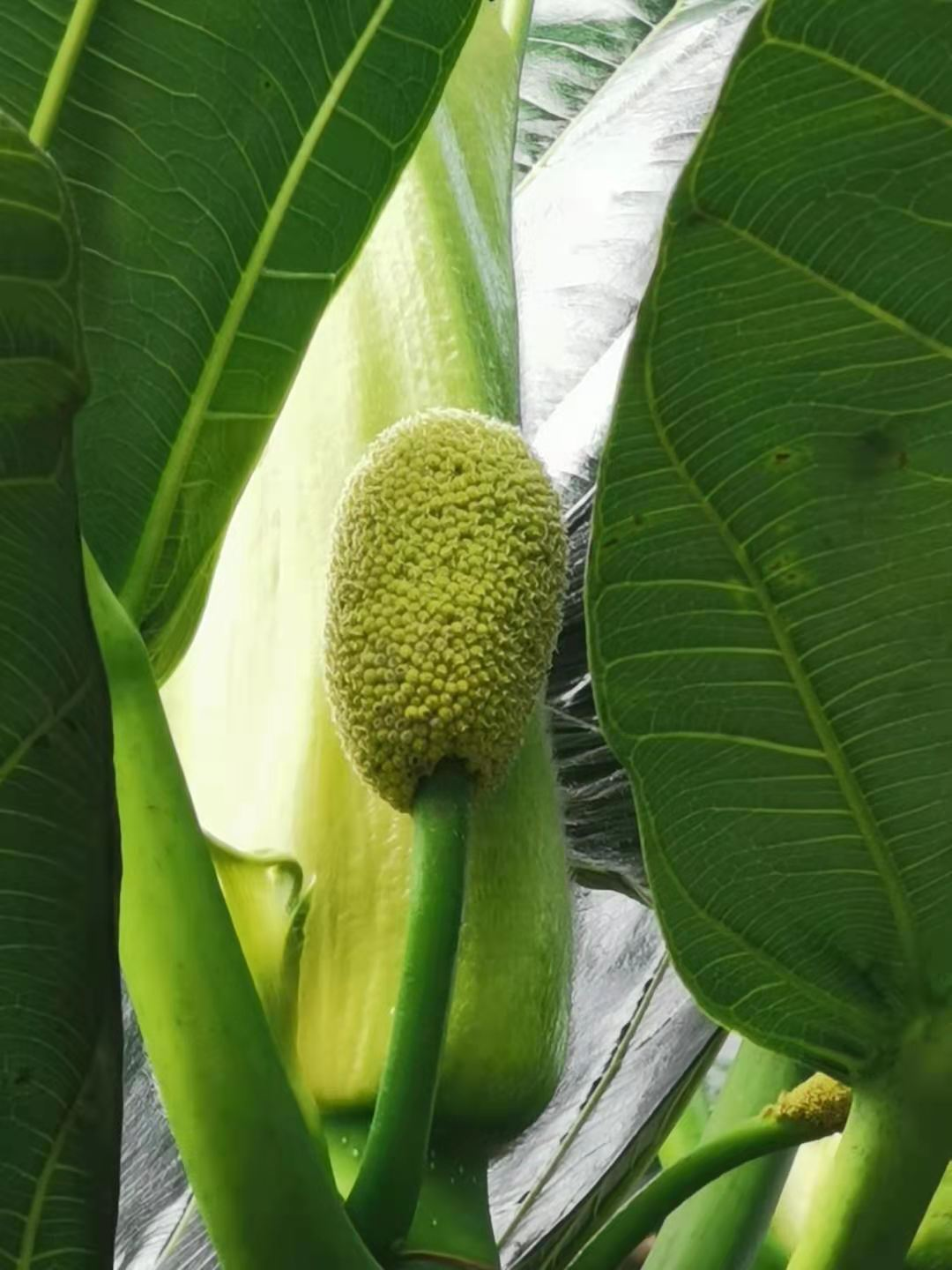
Female inflorescence

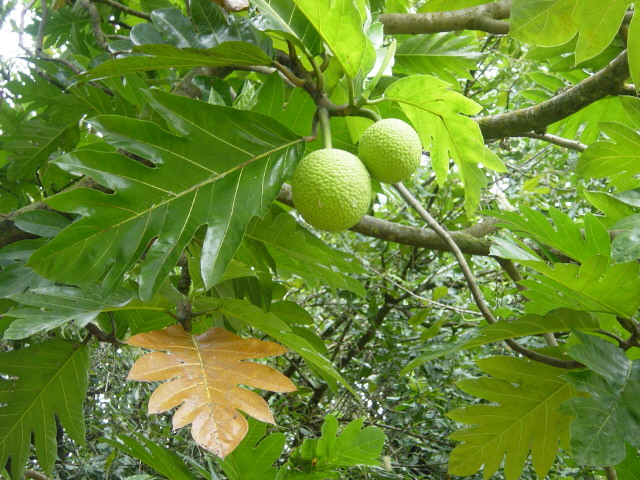
Artocarpus altilis in Hawaii

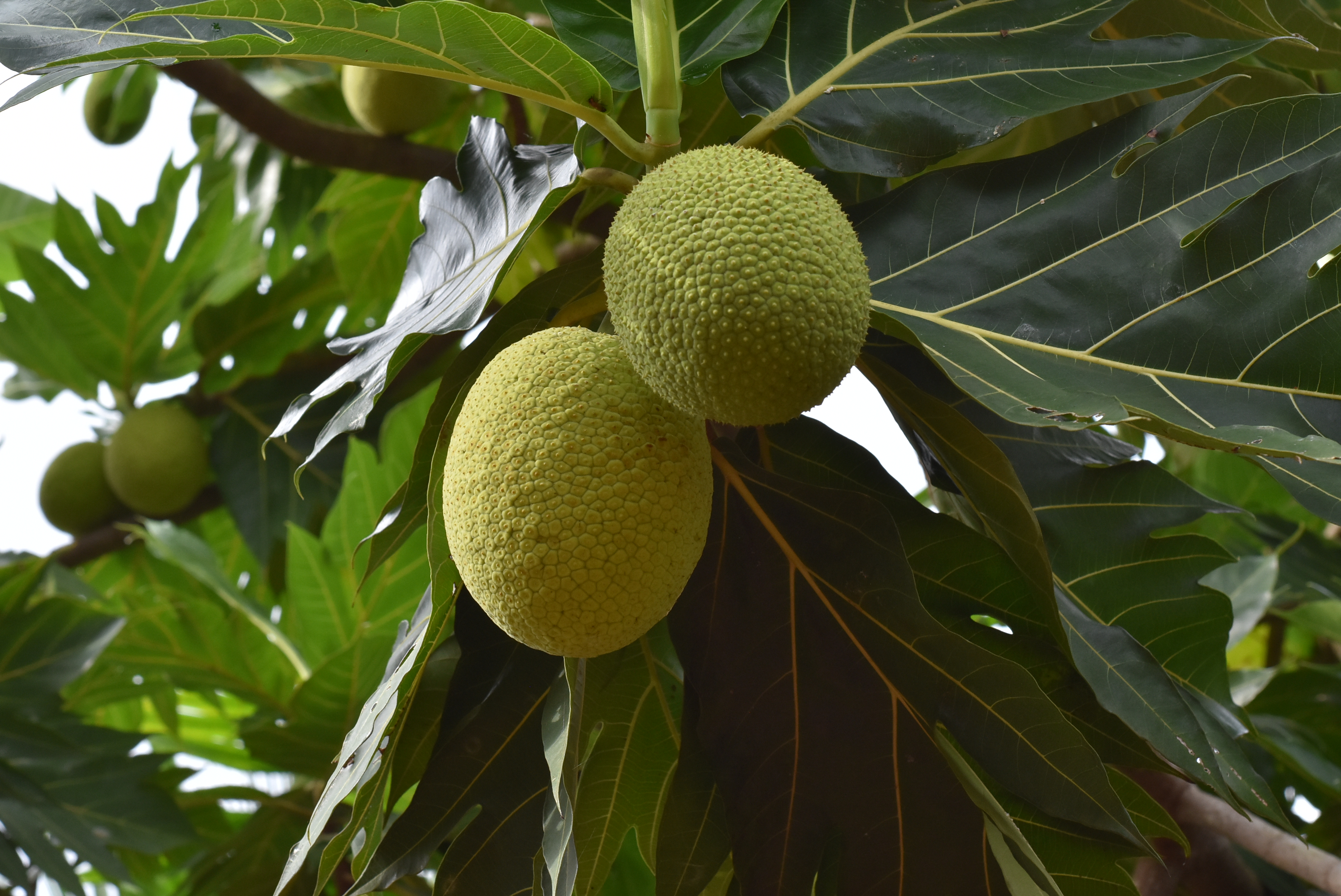
Breadfruit in Mangalore

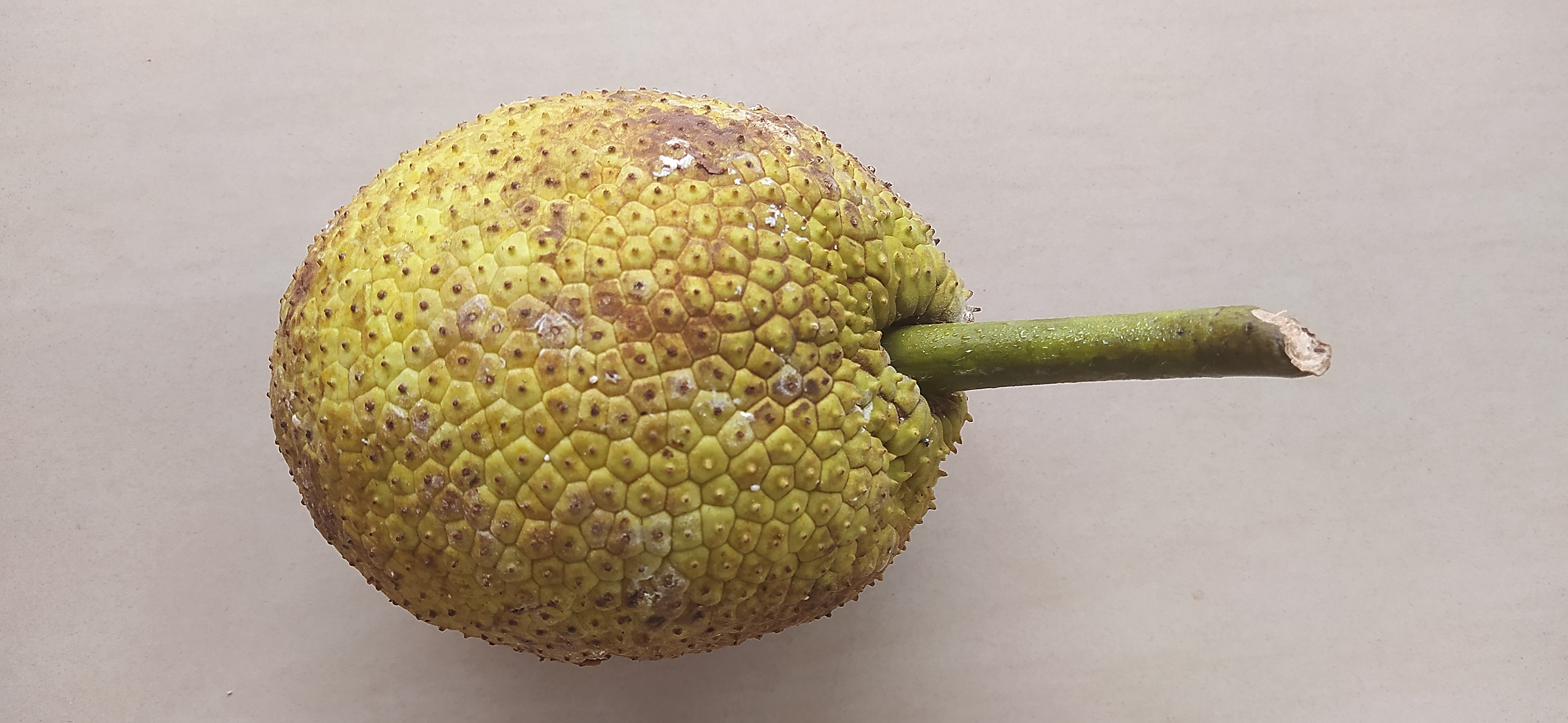
Breadfruit in Kasaragod

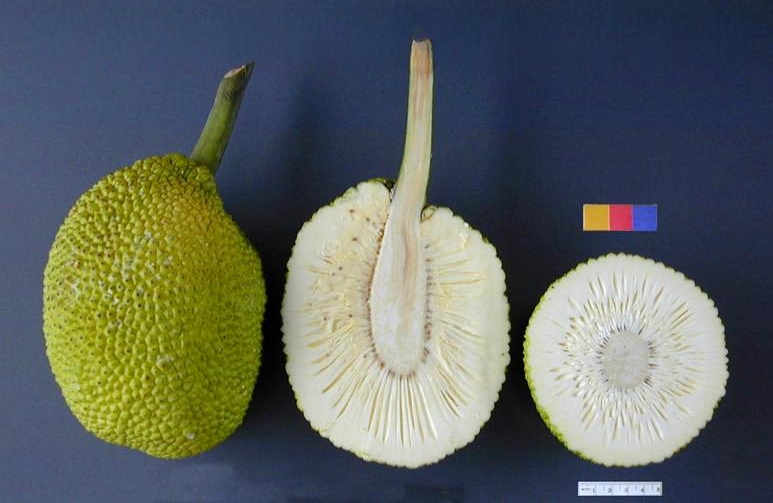
Breadfruit whole, sliced lengthwise, and in cross-section

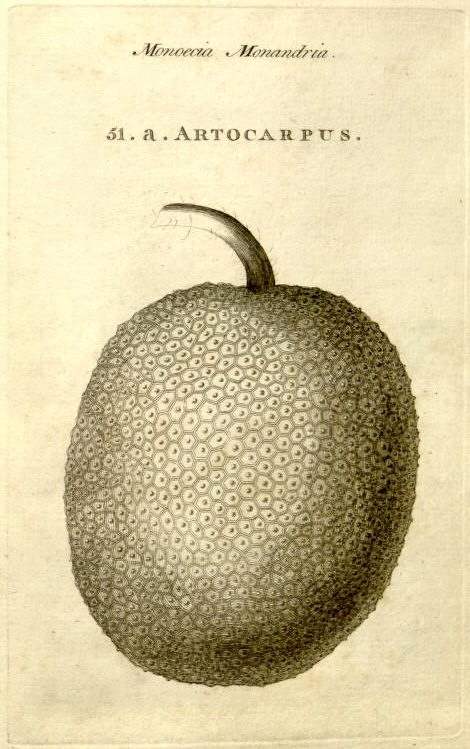
Breadfruit, named and described in Characteres generum plantarum (1776)

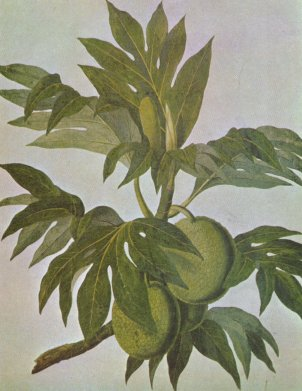
Drawing of breadfruit by John Frederick Miller

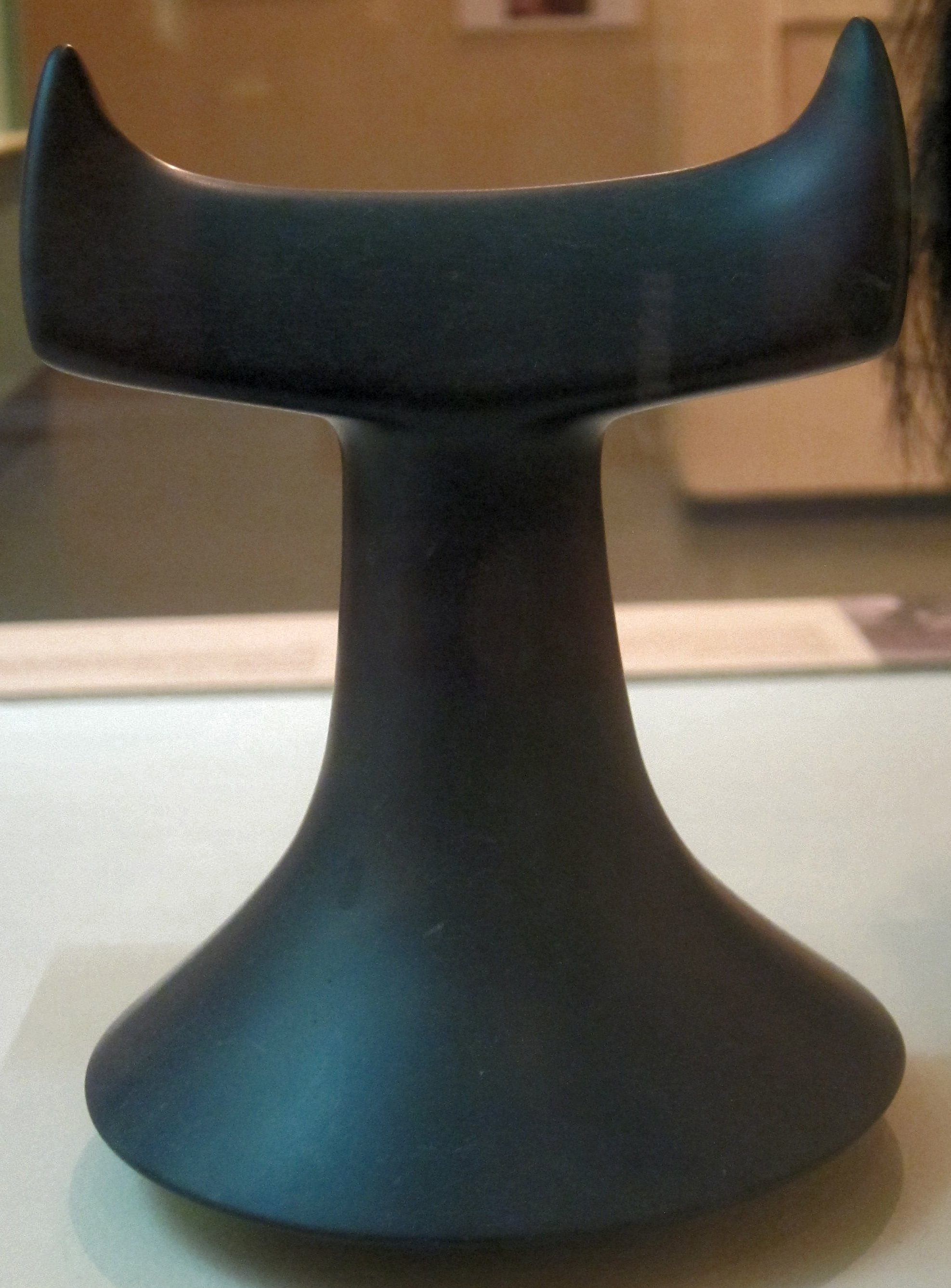
A polished basalt breadfruit pounder

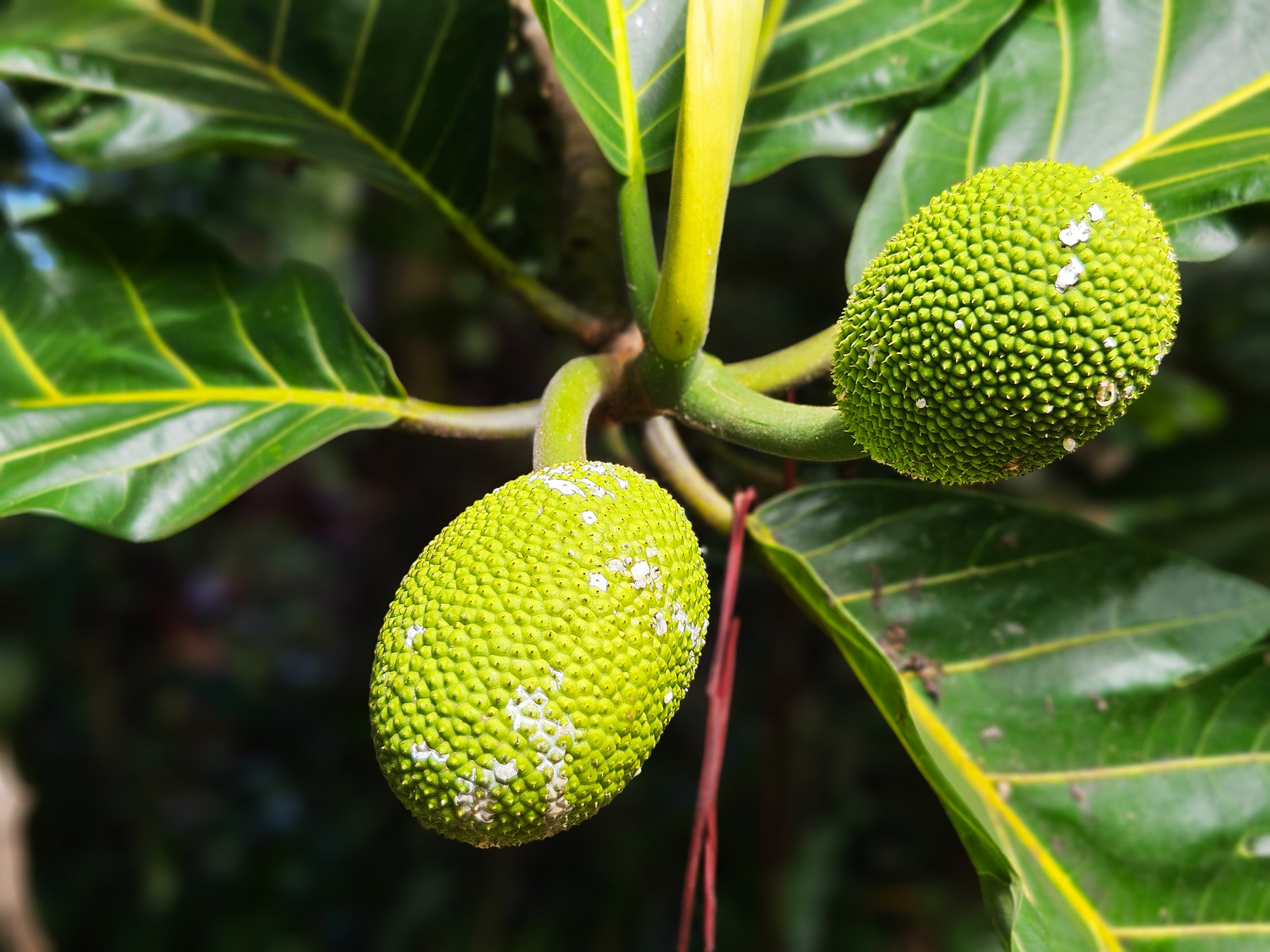
Artocarpus altilis (Hawaii)

== See also ==
- Breadnut (Artocarpus camansi)
- Cempedak (Artocarpus integer)
- Jackfruit (Artocarpus heterophyllus)
- Treculia – known as African breadfruit
