= Assistant =

Assistant may refer to:

- Assistant (by Speaktoit), a virtual assistant app for smartphones
- Assistant (software), a software tool to assist in computer configuration
- Google Assistant, a virtual assistant by Google
- The Assistant (TV series), an MTV reality show
- ST Assistant, a British tugboat
- HMS Assistant, a Royal Navy vessel

== See also ==
- Apprenticeship
- Assistant coach
- Assistant district attorney
- Assistant professor
- Certified nursing assistant
- Court of assistants
- Graduate assistant
- Office Assistant
- Personal assistant
- Personal digital assistant
- Production assistant
- Research assistant
- Teaching assistant
- Assistance (disambiguation)
- Assist (disambiguation)
- Aides (disambiguation)
