= Assist =

Assist or ASSIST may refer to:

== Sports ==
- Assist (association football), a pass by a player or players that helps set up a goal
- Assist (Australian rules football), the last pass by a player that directly helps set up a goal
- Assist (baseball), any touching of the ball by a defensive player after it has been hit by the batter and prior to the recording of a putout
- Assist (basketball), a pass by a player that facilitates a basket by another
- Assist (ice hockey), a pass by a player or players that helps set up a goal
- Assist (ultimate), a pass by a player on which a goal is scored
- Assist (water polo), the last pass by a player that directly helps set up a goal

== Other uses ==
- ASSIST (computing), (Assembler System for Student Instruction and Systems Teaching)
- Assist (Scientology), Scientology practices
- ASSIST Scholars, (American Secondary Schools for International Students and Teachers), international exchange student association
- Seoul Business School at aSSIST University, a Korean business school with several international campuses

== See also ==
- Assistance (disambiguation)
- Assistant (disambiguation)
