= Aidman =

Aidman may refer to:

- Medic (medical aidman)
  - Combat medic
    - A position in the Special Forces Group (Belgium)
- Charles Aidman (1925–1993) U.S. actor

== See also ==
- Corpsman
- Aid (disambiguation)
- Man (disambiguation)
