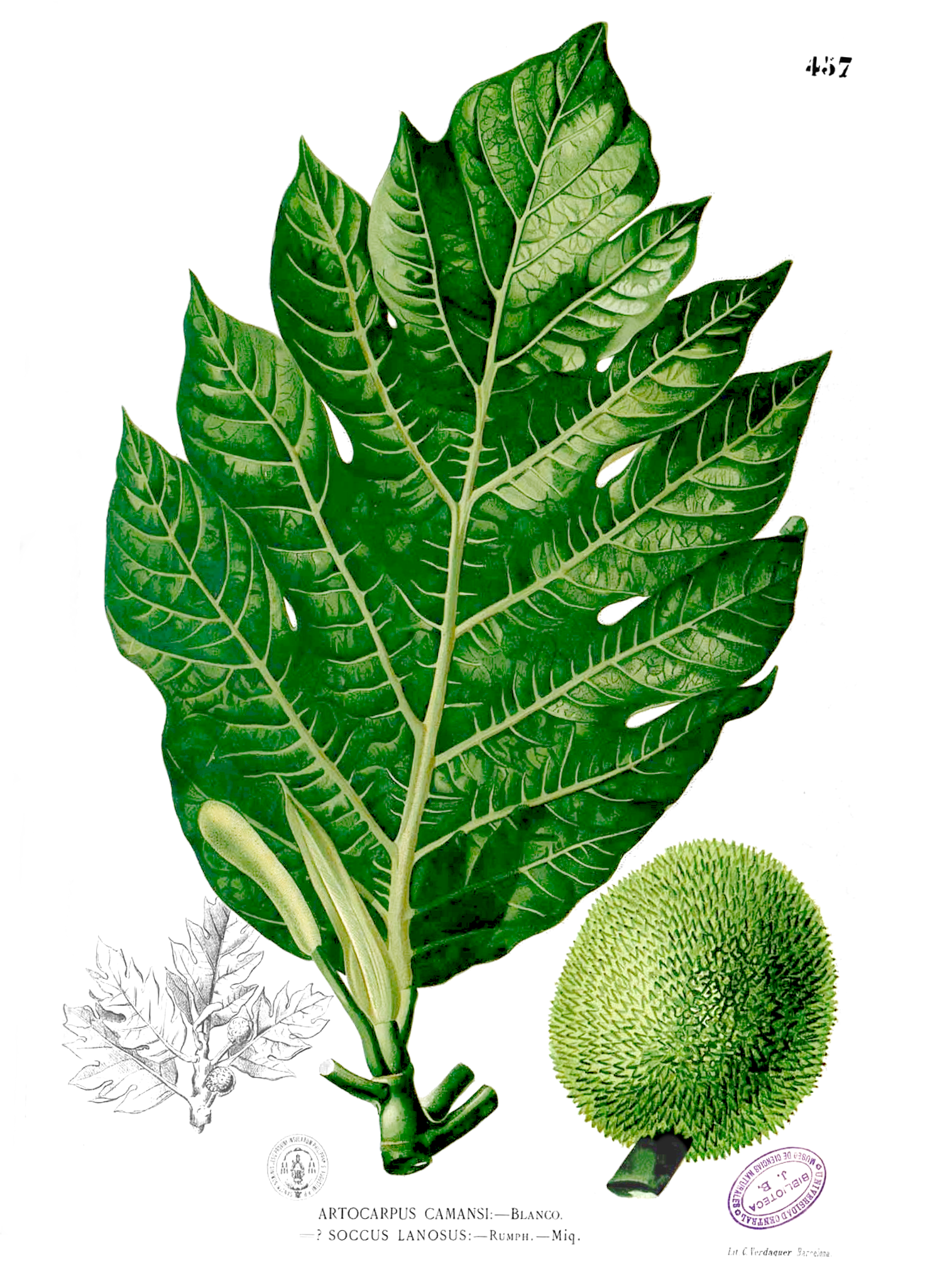

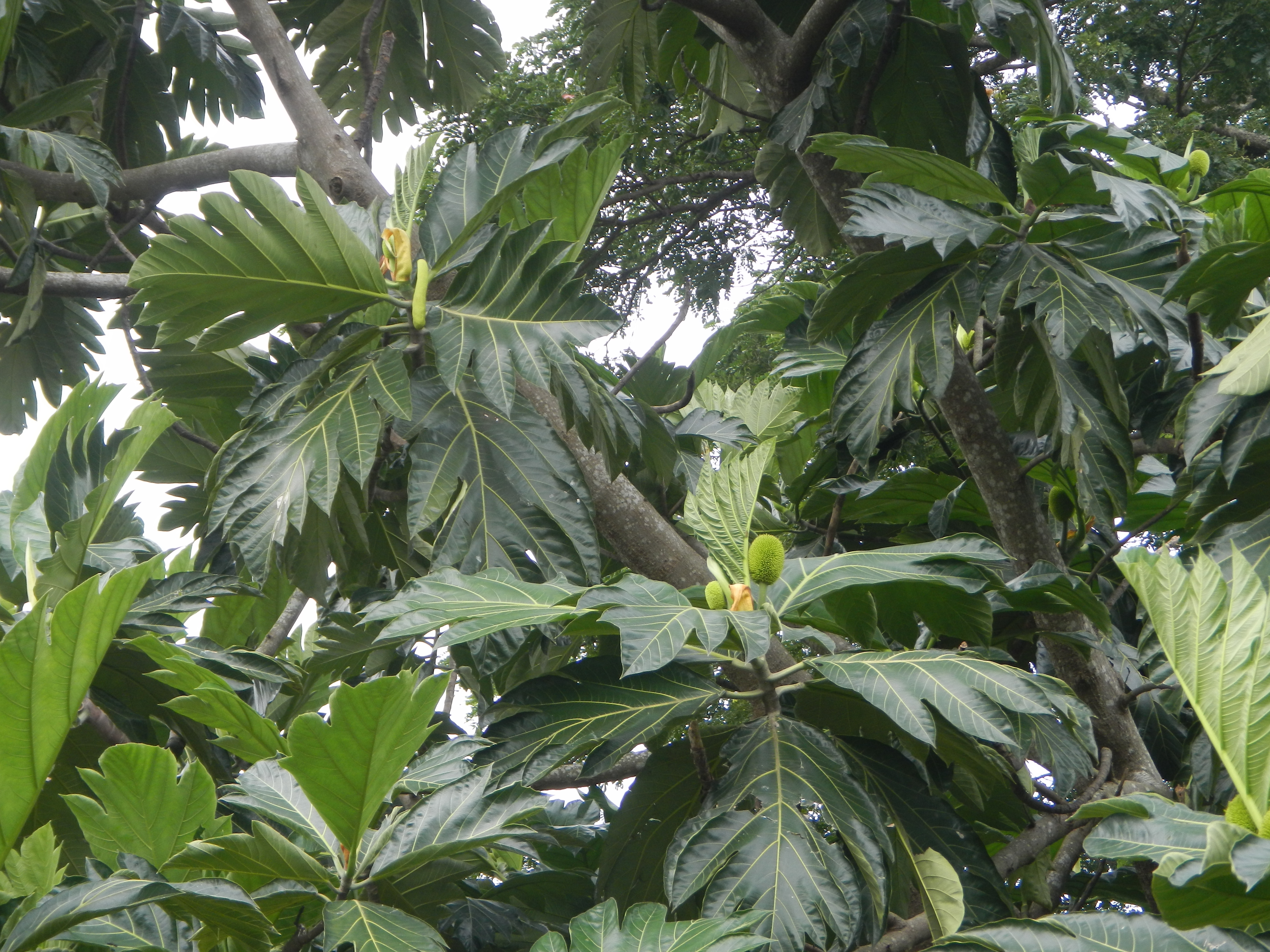
- Artocarpus camansi tree in Nueva Ecija, Philippines

Conservation status
- Near Threatened (IUCN 3.1)

Scientific classification
- Kingdom: Plantae
- Clade: Tracheophytes
- Clade: Angiosperms
- Clade: Eudicots
- Clade: Rosids
- Order: Rosales
- Family: Moraceae
- Genus: Artocarpus
- Species: A. camansi

Binomial name
- Artocarpus camansi Blanco

Synonyms
- Artocarpus altilis var. seminifer (Stokes) Fournet; Artocarpus incisifolius var. seminifer Stokes; Artocarpus incisus var. muricatus Becc.; Artocarpus incisus var. seminifer (Stokes) Duss; Artocarpus leeuwenii Diels; Artocarpus leeuwenii Diels; Artocarpus papuanus Diels

= Artocarpus camansi =

Species of tree

Artocarpus camansi, the breadnut, is a species of medium-sized tree in the family Moraceae. The wild ancestor of A. altilis (breadfruit), it is also known as seeded breadfruit to distinguish it from its mostly seedless descendant.

The breadnut is native to New Guinea, the Bismarck Archipelago, the Maluku Islands, and introduced in the Philippines. Both the fruit and seeds are edible after cooking.

== Description ==
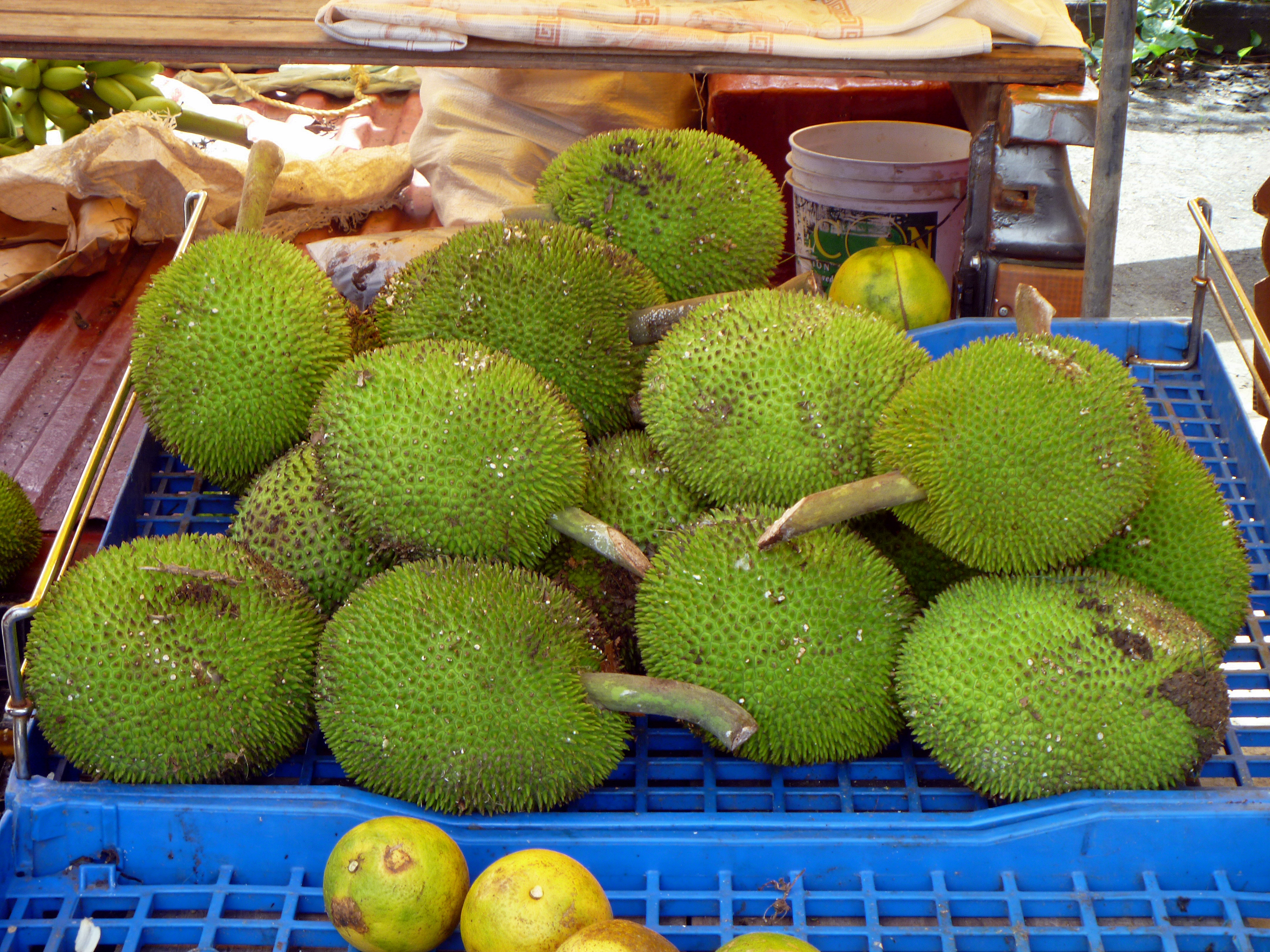
Artocarpus camansi fruits in Trinidad and Tobago

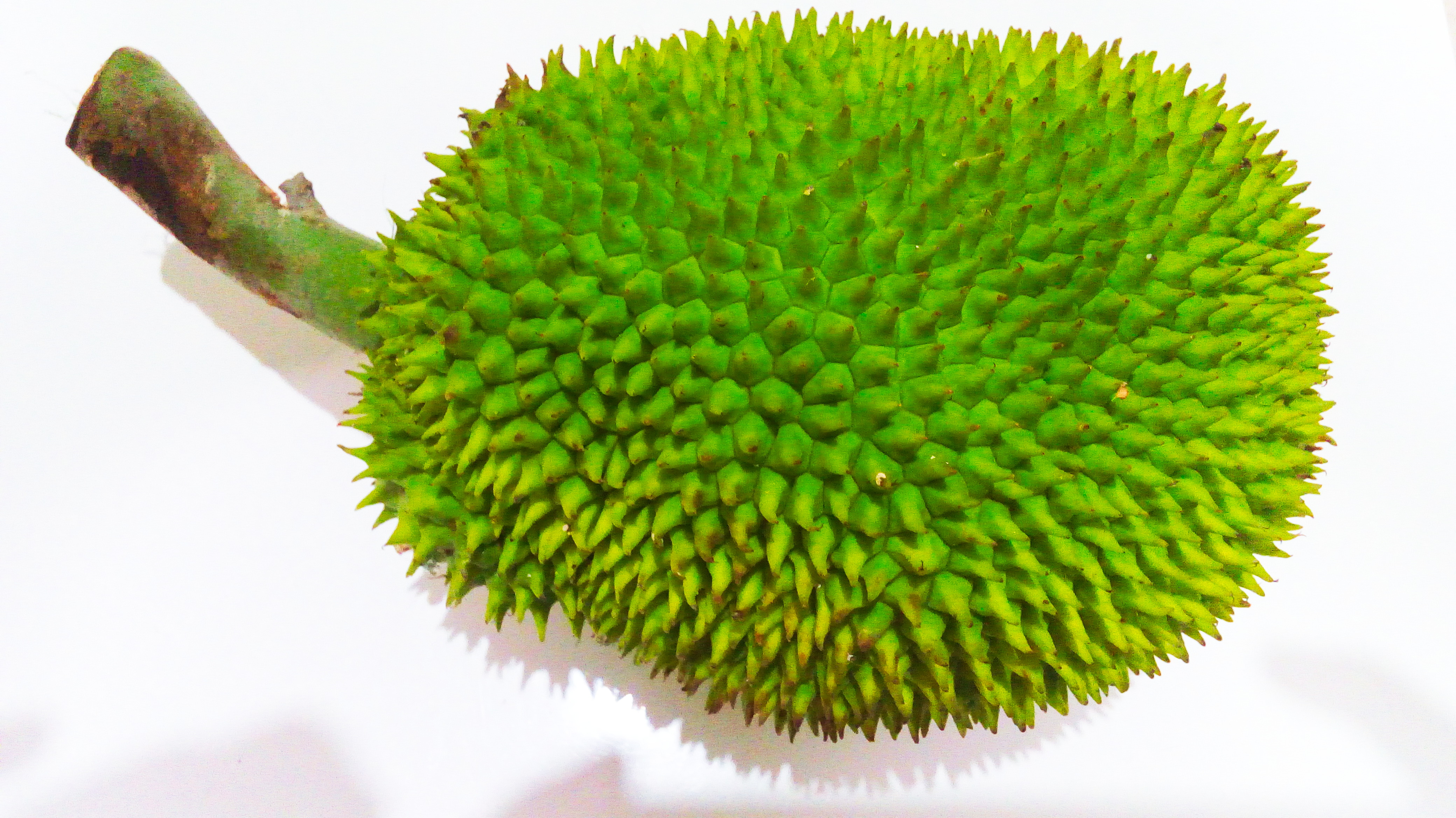
Artocarpus camansi fruit

The morphology of the breadnut is a tree up to 35 metres (115 ft) tall with leaves 40–60 centimetres (16–24 in) long and 25–45 cm (10–17 1/2 in) wide and are pinnately lobed. The plant is monoecious and the male and female flowers occur at the tips of branches. Each male flower has two anthers, and is club-shaped. Thousands of individual male flowers are grouped together in an inflorescence measuring 3 cm (1 1/4 in) in diameter and 25–35 cm (10–14 in) long.

The fruit is globular, weighing 800 g (1.8 lb) and are 16–20 cm (6 1/2–8 in) long by 8–15 cm (3 1/4–6 in) wide with a yellow-green color and each mature tree can produce 600–800 fruits per year. Additionally, when ripe, the interior of the fruit is off white with a sweet taste and aroma. The fruit of the breadnut is mostly seed and the number of seeds per fruit can range from 12 to 150 per fruit at a mass of around 7–10 grams (0.25–0.35 oz) per seed. The seed of the fruit are normally spread by flying fox and other mammals.

=== Similar species ===
Artocarpus camansi can be distinguished from the closely related A. altilis (breadfruit) by having spinier fruits with numerous seeds. Meanwhile, A. mariannensis can be distinguished by having dark green elongated fruits with darker yellow flesh, as well as entire or shallowly lobed leaves.

== Taxonomy ==
The species was first described in 1837 by the Spanish friar and botanist Francisco Manuel Blanco from specimens in the Philippines. The specific name is derived from the plant's Tagalog name kamansi.

Other common names for plant include chataigne, castaña 'tropical' (French and Spanish for the unrelated but culinarily similar chestnut), kapiak in New Guinea, katahar in Guyana, kluwih in Indonesia, sukun biji in Malaysia, kos-del, gamasi in Makassarese, (කොස්දෙල් ) in Sri Lanka, pan de fruta in Dominican Republic (Spanish for its relative breadfruit), labapin in Haïti, and pana de pepita in Puerto Rico.

== Distribution and habitat ==
Artocarpus camansi is native to New Guinea, the Maluku Islands, and the Bismarck Archipelago, and has been introduced to the Philippines. The ambiguity of the origins of this plant is a result of spread and domestication of multiple species of breadfruit, A. camansi included, as Austronesian sailors spread from island to island in the Pacific. Artocarpus altilis, the breadfruit, is believed to be a domesticated descendant of A. camansi, selectively bred by Polynesians to be predominantly seedless.

Breadnut trees can usually be found in tropical environments along low-lying areas at an elevation of 0–1,550 m (0–5,085 ft), inundated riverbanks, and in freshwater swamps. The plant grows best at an annual temperature range of 15–40 °C (59–104 °F) in deep, well drained soil with a neutral to alkaline soil acidity.

== Uses ==
One source states that A. camansi has "high nutritive value but it is an under-utilised food source". Although not as commonly eaten as the breadfruit, it is an important crop in New Guinea, where the breadnut is a staple crop. Usually the fruit is consumed when it is immature; thinly sliced pieces are boiled in soups. In the Philippines (along with the related breadfruit, jackfruit, and antipolo) it is commonly cooked with coconut milk and spices and eaten as ginataang kamansi. In South Asia and the Caribbean it is curried and eaten. The seeds are also of economic value in the Caribbean, Central and South America because they taste like chestnuts. As a result, the seeds can be roasted, boiled, canned, or processed into paste, butter, flour or oil.

== See also ==
- Domesticated plants and animals of Austronesia
- Brosimum alicastrum, another plant also commonly known as "breadnut"
