= Aides =

Aides may refer to:

- AIDES, a French non-governmental organization assisting people with HIV/AIDS
- Aides (skipper), a genus of skippers of family Hesperiidae
- Aides (tax), a French customs duty during the time of Louis XIV
- Hades, a Greek god
- The plural of aide

== See also ==
- Aide (disambiguation)
- Assistant (disambiguation)
- HIV/AIDS
