= Artocarpus blancoi =

Conservation status
- Least Concern (IUCN 3.1)

Scientific classification
- Kingdom: Plantae
- Clade: Embryophytes
- Clade: Tracheophytes
- Clade: Angiosperms
- Clade: Eudicots
- Clade: Rosids
- Order: Rosales
- Family: Moraceae
- Genus: Artocarpus
- Species: A. blancoi

Binomial name
- Artocarpus blancoi Merr.

Species of tree

Artocarpus blancoi is a species of large tree in the family Moraceae endemic to the Philippines. Its habitat (among seasonal forest or thicket growth in low-lying areas) is threatened.

It is locally known as tipolo, tipulo, or atipolo in Tagalog and the Visayan languages (Philippine Spanish: antipolo). Paper production and being a shade provider are its primary uses, although its seeds and fruits are edible and used in the same way as its close relatives, the breadfruit and the seeded breadfruit. The City of Antipolo got its name from the said tree.

== See also ==
- Artocarpus camansi, the wild seeded breadfruit
- Artocarpus altilis, the breadfruit
- Ginataang langka
