= Aide =

Aide or AIDE may refer to:

== People ==
- Aide Iskandar (born 1975), Singaporean professional soccer player
- Charles Hamilton Aide (1826–1906), English author and artist

== Other uses ==
- An aide is a personal assistant
  - aide-de-camp military officer
- Aide (deity), a purported Basque deity
- Aide-mémoire, a document serving as a memory aid, a reminder or memorandum
- AIDE (software), (Advanced Intrusion Detection Environment). An open source host-based intrusion detection system
- Alliance of Independent Democrats in Europe, a former European political party
- Advanced Intrusion Detection Environment, an intrusion detection software package

== See also ==
- Aid (disambiguation)
- Aides (disambiguation)
