= HMS Assistance =

Eleven ships of the Royal Navy have borne the name HMS Assistance:

- English ship Assistance (1650) was a 50-gun ship launched in 1650, rebuilt in 1699, 1712 and 1725, and sunk in 1746 as a breakwater.
- HMS Assistance (1747) was a 50-gun fourth rate launched in 1747 and sold in 1773.
- HMS Assistance (1771) was a transport launched in 1771 and sold in 1802.
- HMS Assistance (1781) was a 50-gun fourth rate launched in 1781 and wrecked in 1802.
- HMS Assistance was a prison hulk, launched in 1769 as the 74-gun third rate HMS Royal Oak. She became a prison hulk in 1796, was renamed HMS Assistance in 1805 and was broken up in 1815.
- HMS Assistance (1809) was a storeship launched in 1809 at Deptford and sold in 1821.
- HMS Assistance (1850) was a discovery vessel, formerly the merchant vessel Baboo. She was purchased in 1850 and abandoned in the Arctic in 1854.
- HMS Assistance (1855) was a screw storeship purchased in 1855 and wrecked in 1860.
- HMS Assistance (1874) was an iron screw storeship launched in 1874 and sold in 1897.
- HMS Assistance (1900) was a repair ship purchased in 1900 and handed over to Ward shipbreakers in part payment for RMS Majestic in 1937.
- HMS Assistance (F173) was a repair ship launched in 1944 and transferred to the Royal Navy under lend-lease. She was returned to the US Navy in 1946.

== See also ==
- HMS Assistant
