= Aid (rapper) =

- Also known as: Aid, Aid Alonso
- Born: Aida Alonso Iglesias; March 28, 1990 (age 36)
- Origin: Vigo, Galicia (Spain)
- Genres: Hip hop; R&B
- Occupations: Rapper; singer-songwriter
- Years active: 2003–present
- Label: Aid
- Website: Official website

Aida Alonso Iglesias (born March 28, 1990), known professionally as Aid or Aid Alonso, is a Spanish rapper, singer, songwriter and record producer. She started her professional career in 2009 after receiving the Heineken Greenspace Award, and her song Boogie Vigo was rated Latin Single Of The Week on iTunes. In 2011, the song Apréndeo was considered the most listened song in the Galician language on YouTube.

== Early life ==
Aid was born in Vigo, Spain. She started to record songs when she was 12 years old and a friend of hers discovered her recordings and decided to upload them to a music website. The recordings became popular with more than 100,000 downloads.

== Career ==
In 2007, Aid released Aqui Teneis, a self-released solo album. On October 22, 2008, she won the Heineken Greenspace festival contest in Valencia (Spain). Aid was the first rap artist and youngest one winning the contest, and she performed with Lagartija Nick and Enrique Morente in the main concert of the festival. On February 9, 2009, Aid released her debut album Jugando. On July 28, 2009, the song Boogie Vigo was rated as Latin Single of the Week on iTunes worldwide. In September 2009, she was Artist of the Month by Ones to Watch Myspace. On June 11, 2009, she won the contest Márcate un Squares of Kellogs.

In 2011, Aid released the song Apréndeo. The song has been rated the most listened song in Galician language in YouTube.

In 2012, she released Rapoemas, a cd-book which adapted classics of Galician poetry like Rosalía de Castro, Álvaro Cunqueiro, Manuel Antonio and Curros Enríquez into rap music.

In 2013, she released her album Hacer Lo Que Quiero.

In 2014, Aid released Tierra de Sol, a single composed for the BBC representing Spain under the 1Xtra Radio freestyles. In November 2014, she received the award Xeración Viguesa.

Her single and video Que Miren recorded and filmed in Los Angeles was released in January 2017.

In 2020 she collaborated in the soundtrack of the Indian TV show Commit Mental.

In 2022 she released the single Senses.

== Other works ==
Aid teaches about rap and lyrical composition in schools.

She has worked as a radio host and board operator and has been collaborating as presenter in local TV.

She graduated as an electrical engineer.

On April 9, 2016, she spoke at the TEDx event in California State University, Long Beach.

== Discography ==
- Demo (2004)
- Aqui Teneis (2007)
- Jugando (2009)
- Rapoemas (2012)
- Hacer Lo Que Quiero (2013)

== Featurings ==
- Porta "Suben al cielo" (En Boca de Tantos, 2008)
- EL Payo Malo "Escucha a la gente" (2009)
- Efesio "Creer pour avancer" (2012)
- Porta (rapper)|Porta "No tienes hueco" (Reset, 2012)
- Ambkor "La luz" (Tren de Vuelta a Casa, 2014)
- Mowlihawk, Reke, Tailon, Servando, RKing "No importa el color" (2014)
- Dezzy Hollow "Disparando" (2016)
