= Aides (skipper) =

- Aides dysoni

Scientific classification
- Kingdom: Animalia
- Phylum: Arthropoda
- Clade: Pancrustacea
- Class: Insecta
- Order: Lepidoptera
- Family: Hesperiidae
- Subtribe: Calpodina
- Genus: Aides; Billberg, 1820

Genus of butterflies

Aides is a Neotropical genus of skippers in the family Hesperiidae.

== Species ==
The following species are recognised in the genus Aides:

- Aides aegita (Hewitson, 1866) aegita silverpatch – Panama to Bolivia and Brazil
- Aides aestria (Hewitson, 1866) type locality Brazil
- Aides brilla (H. Freeman, 1970) brilliant silverpatch – southeast Mexico, Guatemala, Belize
- Aides brino (Stoll, 1781) brino silverpatch – Honduras, Colombia to Guianas and north Brazil
- Aides duma
  - Aides duma duma Evans, 1955 type locality Argentina
  - Aides duma argyrina Cowan, 1970 Panama to south Brazil
- Aides dysoni Godman, 1900 Dyson's silverpatch – east Mexico to Colombia
- Aides ocrinus (Plötz, 1882) ocrinus silverpatch – Panama, Colombia, French Guiana
