= Americans for Informed Democracy =

U.S. nonprofit organization

Americans for Informed Democracy (AID) is a non-partisan 501(c)(3) organization that is based in Washington, D.C.

== History ==
Americans for Informed Democracy (AID) was founded by a group of American students who studied abroad just after the September 11th attacks. A few of those who studied abroad were met with intense sympathy and solidarity from people around the world. When they came back to the US, they were often asked why some people from around the world disagreed with American values. These students set up AID to bring the world home to Americans, and to launch student dialogue and action about what the US role in the world should look like.

== Work ==
AIDemocracy's strategy has three pillars:

- Education: AIDemocracy helps students understand key issues in environment, development, peace and security, and health, as well as the global system that frames these issues. Specific tactics include: creating an annual Network Platform and Report Card, issue training (issue briefs, coaching, webinars, toolkits, videoconferences, film screenings, speaker tours, etc.), and issue monitoring (blogs, new media and student Issue Analysts).
- Cultivation: AIDemocracy cultivates student leaders and organizers who understand not only the issues but also their own power, how to organize others, and how to access decision-makers. Specific tactics include advocacy, organizing and leadership training, and building a community of student leaders (regional and annual summits, participation in meetings and parallel events, network "weaving").
- Mobilization: AIDemocracy creates and connects students to opportunities to take action, from the campus to the national level. In addition to promoting opportunities to take action through AIDemocracy and partner campaigns, it also supports student campaigns on these issues. Tactics include policymaker education and lobby visits, using the media (op-eds, LTEs, etc.), blogs, new media (Facebook, video, etc.), days of action, strategic coaching, etc.

== Supporters ==
AIDemocracy is supported by the Rockefeller Brothers Fund, Open Society Institute, DarMac Foundation, Hewlett Foundation, Connect US and its many participating universities.
