= Aid (Würm) =

River in Germany

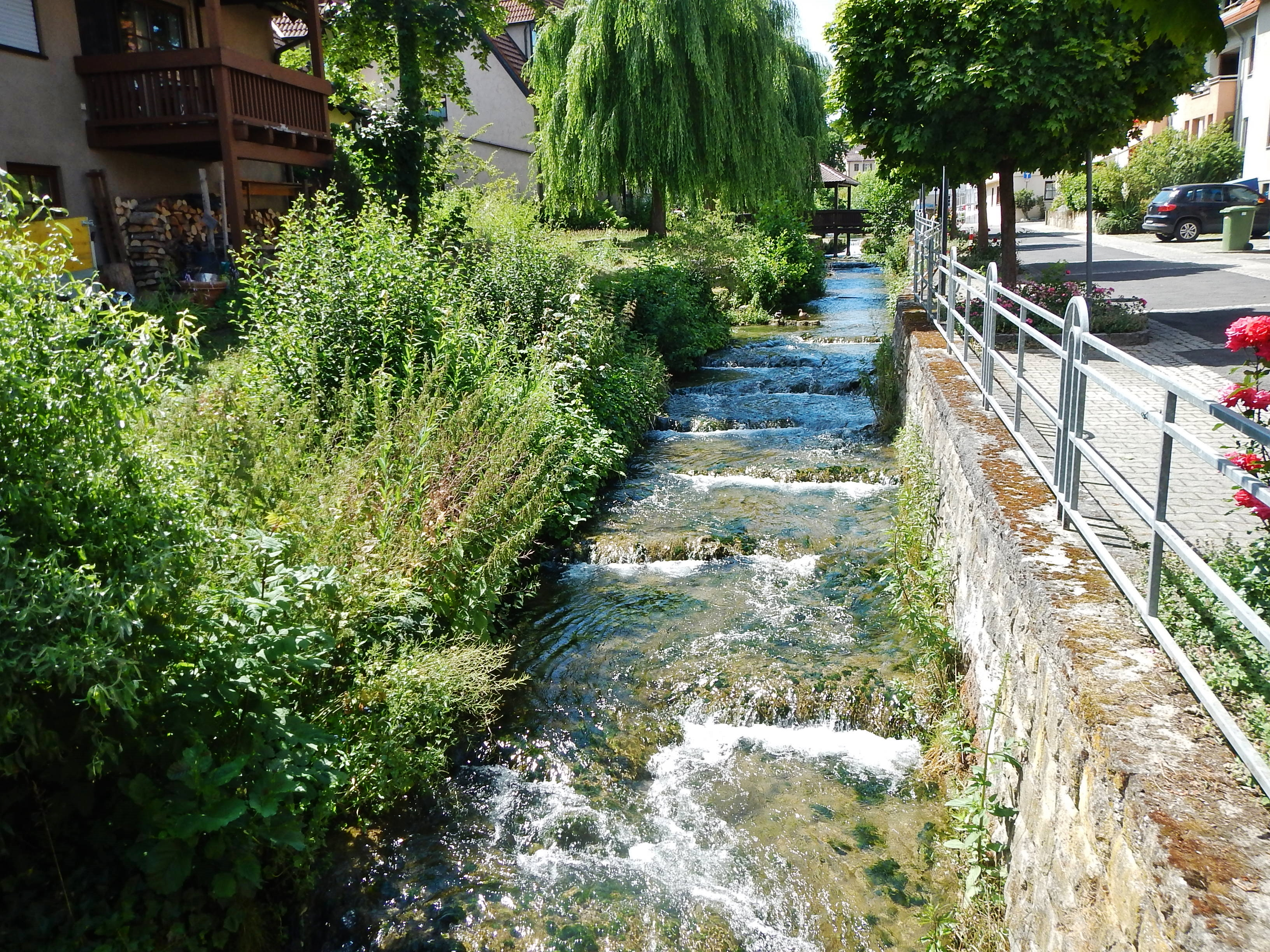
- The Aid in Aidlingen

- Location of mouth

Location
- Country: Germany
- State: Baden-Württemberg

Physical characteristics
- Mouth
  - location: Würm
  - coordinates: 48.6816°N 8.9075°E
- Length: 10.8 km (6.7 mi)

Basin features
- Progression: Würm→ Nagold→ Enz→ Neckar→ Rhine→ North Sea

The Aid (in its upper course: Irm) is a river in Baden-Württemberg, Germany. It is a left tributary of the Würm in Aidlingen.

== See also ==
- List of rivers of Baden-Württemberg
