= Aide (deity) =

Basque numenistic deity of the air

Aide is the Basque numenistic deity of the air. She could manifest herself in both good (gentle breeze) and evil (storm wind) forms.
