= AIDS (computer virus) =

DOS computer virus

Malware details
- Technical name: AIDS
- Aliases: AIDSB, AIDS-II, AIDS II, AIDS92, Hahaha, Taunt
- Type: DOS
- Subtype: COM to EXE infector; Corrupter
- Classification: Virus
- Family: N/A
- Isolation date: c. 1989
- Origin: Unknown
- Author: Unknown

AIDS is a DOS computer virus which overwrites COM files.

== Description ==
AIDS is the first virus known to exploit the MS-DOS "corresponding file" vulnerability. In MS-DOS, if the user enters FOO in the command interpreter, in a directory where both FOO.COM and FOO.EXE exist, then FOO.COM will always be executed. Thus, by creating infected COM files, AIDS code will always be executed before the intended EXE file.

When the AIDS virus activates, it displays the following screen (bracketed comments not in original):

ATTENTION: I have been elected to inform you that throughout your process of collecting and executing files, you have accidentally ¶HÜ¢KΣ► [phucked in leet] yourself over: again, that's PHUCKED yourself over. No, it cannot be; YES, it CAN be, a √ìτûs [virus] has infected your system. Now what do you have to say about that? HAHAHAHAHA. Have ¶HÜÑ [phun] with this one and rememember, there is NO cure for AIDS

In the message above, the word "AIDS" covers about half of the screen. The system is then halted, and must be powered down and rebooted to restart it.

The AIDS virus overwrites the first 13,952 bytes of an infected COM file. Overwritten files must be deleted and replaced with clean copies in order to remove the virus. It is not possible to recover the overwritten portion of the program.

== AIDS II ==
AIDS 2

Malware details
- Technical name: AIDS II.8064
- Aliases: AIDS-II, Aids.8064, AIDS_8064, AIDS_II.8064
- Type: DOS
- Subtype: EXE to COM companion General nuisance
- Classification: Virus
- Family: AIDS II
- Isolation date: April 1990
- Origin: Unknown
- Authors: WOP & PGT of DutchCrack

AIDS II is a companion computer virus, which infects COM files. First discovered in April 1990, it appears to be a more elegant revision of AIDS, which also employs the corresponding file technique to execute infected code.

Unlike generic file infectors, AIDS II is the second known virus to use the "corresponding file technique" of infection (after the original AIDS), and the first to use this technique in a way that does not modify the original target EXE file. AIDS II works by first finding an uninfected EXE file in the working directory and then creating a companion COM file with the viral code. The COM files will always be 8,064 bytes in length, with a timestamp corresponding to the time of infection. After creating the new COM file, the virus then plays a loud note, and displays the following message:

Your computer is infected with ...
❤ Aids Virus II ❤
- Signed WOP & PGT of DutchCrack -

AIDS II then executes EXE file the user intended to execute without incident. Once that program is exited, control returns to the virus. The note is replayed, with a new message displayed:

Getting used to me?
Next time, use a Condom .....

Since the EXE file is unchanged, cyclic redundancy checks, such as those present in antivirus software, cannot detect this virus having infected a system. A way to remove AIDS II manually is to check for EXE files with an identically named COM file 8,064 bytes in length. Those COM files can be deleted.

According to Symantec, AIDS II may play a melody and display the following string:

Your computer is infected with AIDS VIRUS II
