= ASSIST Scholars =

US-based non-profit organization

ASSIST
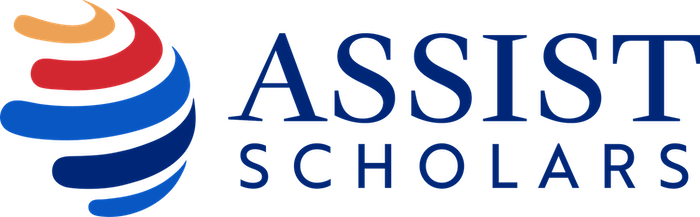
- Founded: 1969
- Founder: Paul G. Sanderson, Jr.
- Type: non-profit student exchange organization
- Location: Suffield, Connecticut
- Region served: United States
- Services: student exchange
- Website: www.assistscholars.org

ASSIST Scholars is a nonprofit, international student exchange organization based in the United States and active in more than thirty countries worldwide. ASSIST places academically and extracurricularly excelling international students on one-year merit-based scholarships at American independent secondary schools.

== Structure ==
ASSIST is a 501(c)(3) nonprofit organization with tax-exempt status incorporated in the state of Vermont. ASSIST is designated by the United States State Department as an authorized Exchange Visitor Program and is listed with the Council on Standards for International Educational Travel. This arrangement allows ASSIST to use the services of American facilities and staff overseas and has made possible the endorsement and support of international government officials. ASSIST is able to facilitate the issuance of the J-1 visa, under which some of its students study in the United States for one academic year on Exchange Visitor status.

== History ==
ASSIST was founded in 1969 by Paul G. Sanderson, Jr., then Suffield Academy’s Director of Admissions, who wanted to enrich American independent secondary schools through an international educational community. Sanderson began with a class of 13 students and started ASSIST as an educational and cultural exchange program to bring talented young men and women to study in the United States on one-year scholarships.

From its original base in Germany, ASSIST has expanded to numerous other countries and has brought students from nations underrepresented in member schools’ student bodies.

After the death of Sanderson, Kenneth and Betsy Lindfors were appointed to lead ASSIST. During their 13-year tenure, ASSIST expanded substantially. Following their retirement, the ASSIST Board of Directors named Robert and Anne Stanley as the third leadership team in ASSIST's history. Today, Martin Milne serves as President, with Bill Mena as Director of School Relations.

To date, more than 6,100 students from 51 countries have become ASSIST Scholars.

== Scholar selection ==
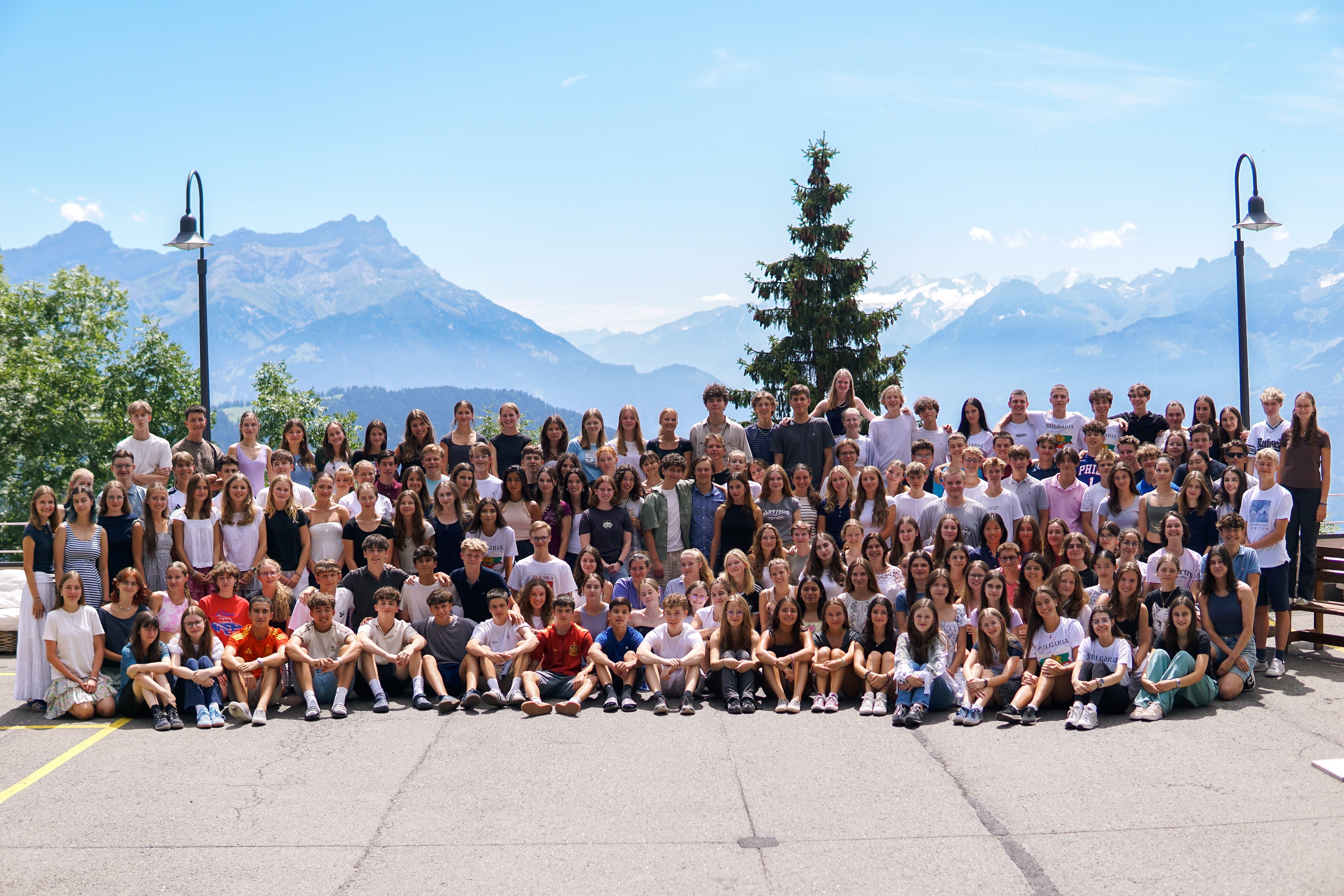
ASSIST class of 2025/2026

ASSIST's recruitment and interview teams travel around the world interviewing potential program candidates. In 2024, from a pool of over 1,000 applications, 546 finalists were invited to an interview, and 171 were accepted as ASSIST Scholars.

Over 90% of ASSIST students earn honors or high honors academic standing each year. Students are also selected to make contributions to the artistic, athletic, community service and other extracurricular programs and to share their own cultural backgrounds. In the class of 2025/2026, ASSIST scholars come from 31 countries, including 4 continents and have fluency in three languages on average. Their talents range from award-winning athletes to championship debaters to nationally recognized musicians.

== Member schools and countries ==
All ASSIST member schools are independent high schools and are members of the National Association of Independent Schools. Every school agrees to accept at least one international student on a full scholarship and may also accept additional students on partial scholarships. The scholarship includes tuition and room and board. Scholarships are offered for one year only, after which the scholar must return home to complete their secondary education.

ASSIST reviews member schools. Each school is visited by ASSIST staff and volunteers to ensure that the programs available meet the needs of the students who apply to the ASSIST program.

The organization is active in more than thirty countries per year. Its head office is located in Suffield, Connecticut, United States.
