= Financial assistance =

Financial assistance or financial aid can refer to:

- Financial assistance (share purchase), assistance given by a company for the purchase of its shares or those of its holding companies
- Funding of science, the provision of financing for scientific research projects
- Welfare spending, financial aid primarily by governmental institutions or charitable organizations to individuals in need
- Subsidy
- Student financial aid, funding intended to help students pay educational expenses
- Bailout, financial support to a company or country which faces serious financial difficulty
- Bursary, a monetary award made by an institution to individuals or groups of people who cannot afford to pay full fees
