= AIDS (aeronautics) =

AIDS (Aircraft Integrated Data System) was the precursor to current aircraft systems such as ACMS (Aircraft Condition Monitoring System) and ACMF (Aircraft Condition Monitoring Function) that allow the airline to utilise parameter values that exist on the aircraft buses.

The original Airbus A320 was equipped with an AIDS system. This included an AIDS print button which, when programmed over the MCDU, allows paper data reports, DAR recordings, or ACARS transmissions of a select amount of parameters to be printed.
