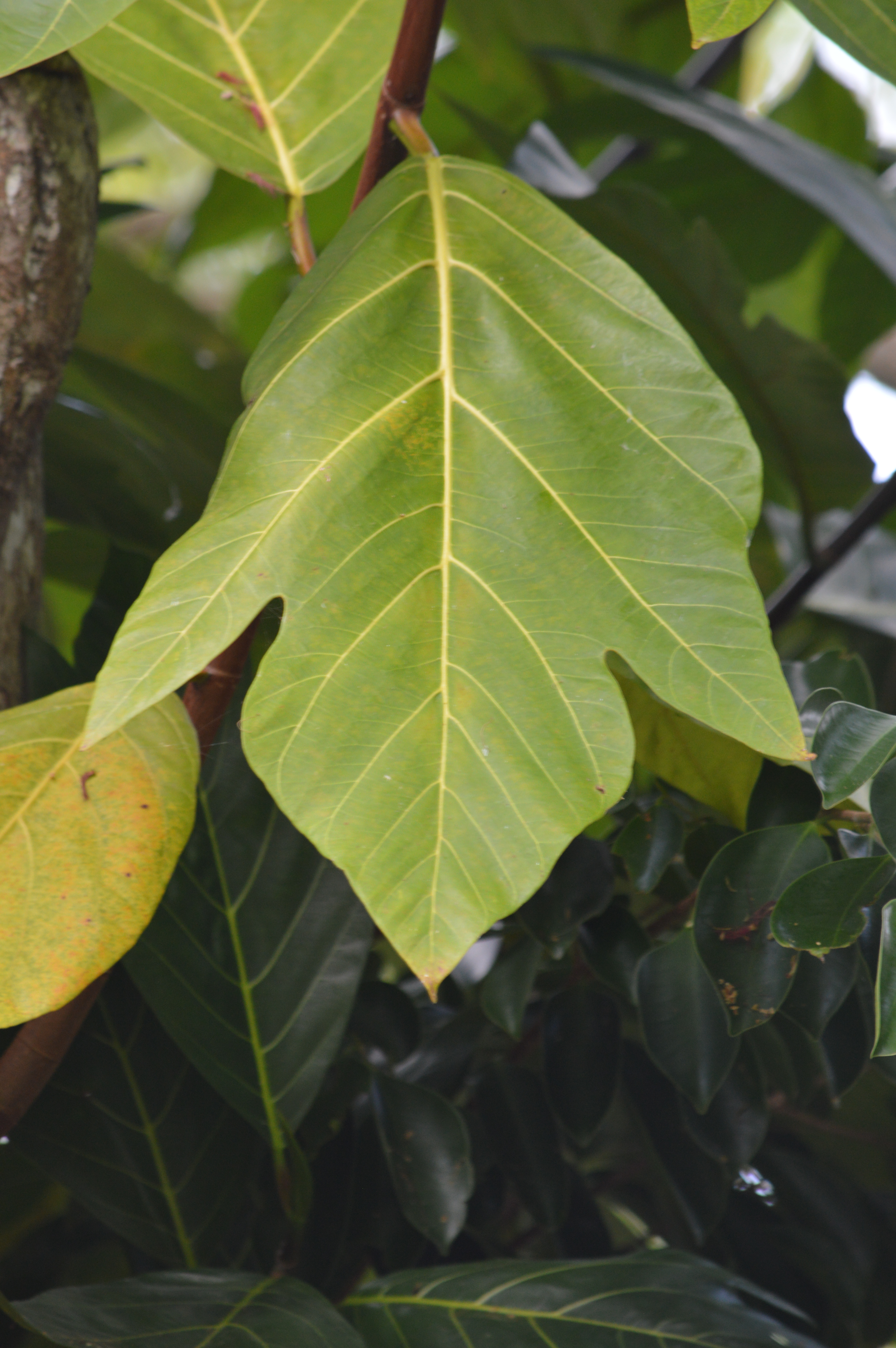
- Characteristic "duck foot" leaf shape

Scientific classification
- Kingdom: Plantae
- Clade: Tracheophytes
- Clade: Angiosperms
- Clade: Eudicots
- Clade: Rosids
- Order: Rosales
- Family: Moraceae
- Genus: Artocarpus
- Species: A. mariannensis

Binomial name
- Artocarpus mariannensis Trécul

= Artocarpus mariannensis =

Species of flowering plant

Artocarpus mariannensis (Chamorro: dugdug), also known as the Marianas breadfruit or the seeded breadfruit, is a species of plant in the mulberry / fig family, Moraceae. It is endemic to the Mariana Islands and Guam. It has been utilized extensively by the Micronesian people, being one of the staple food crops that was introduced to other islands in Micronesia.

== Gallery ==
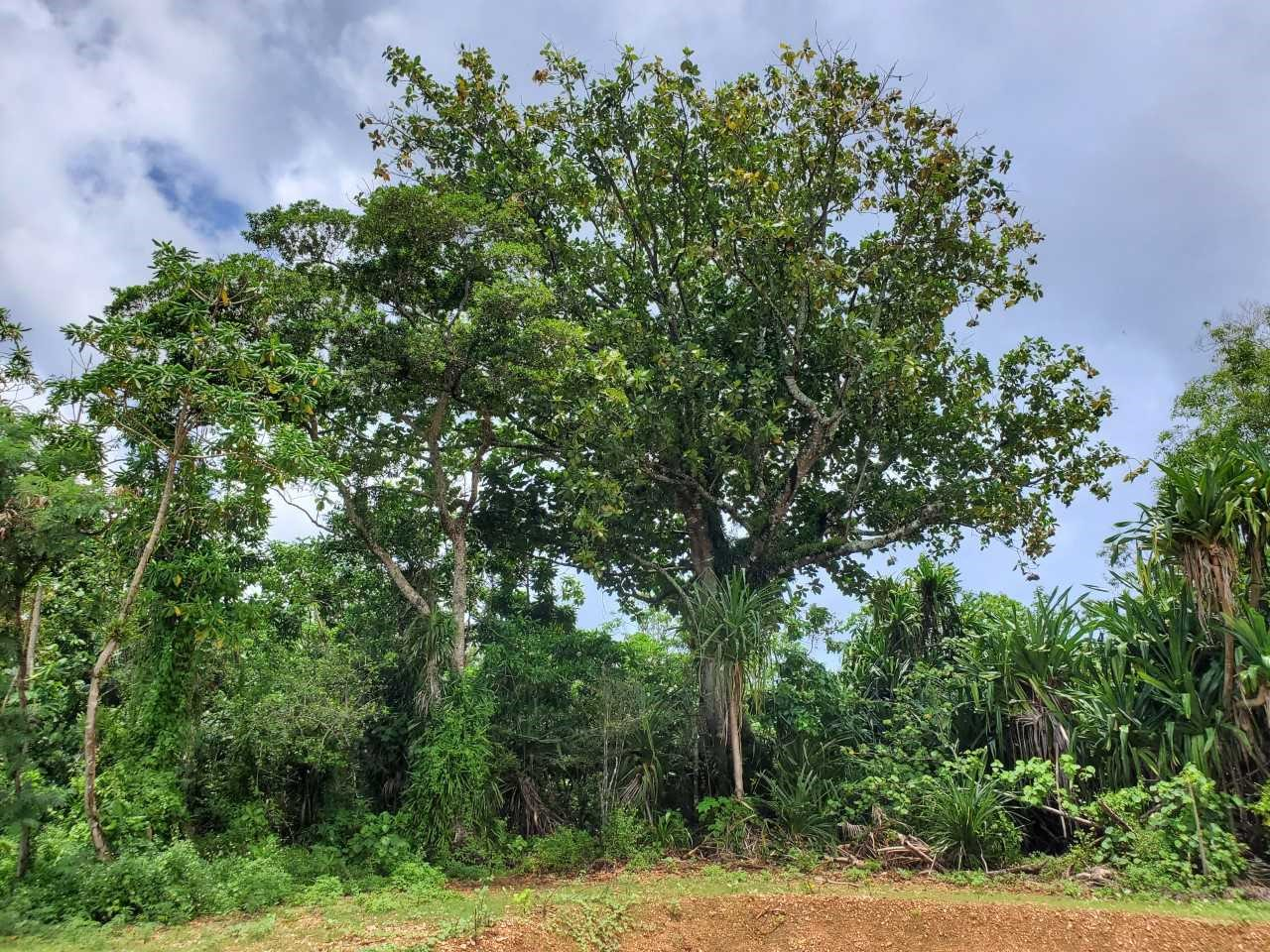
Mature tree, Anderson Air Force Base, Guam

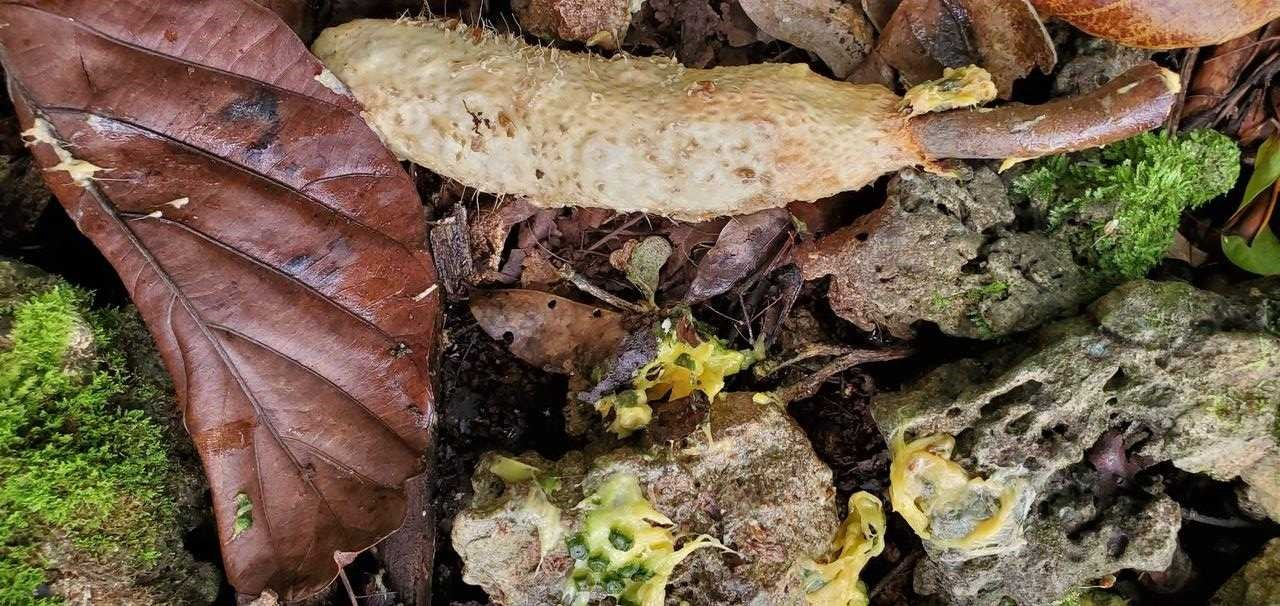
Fruit core and stem, with scattered pieces of fruit on limestone coral, Dededo, Guam

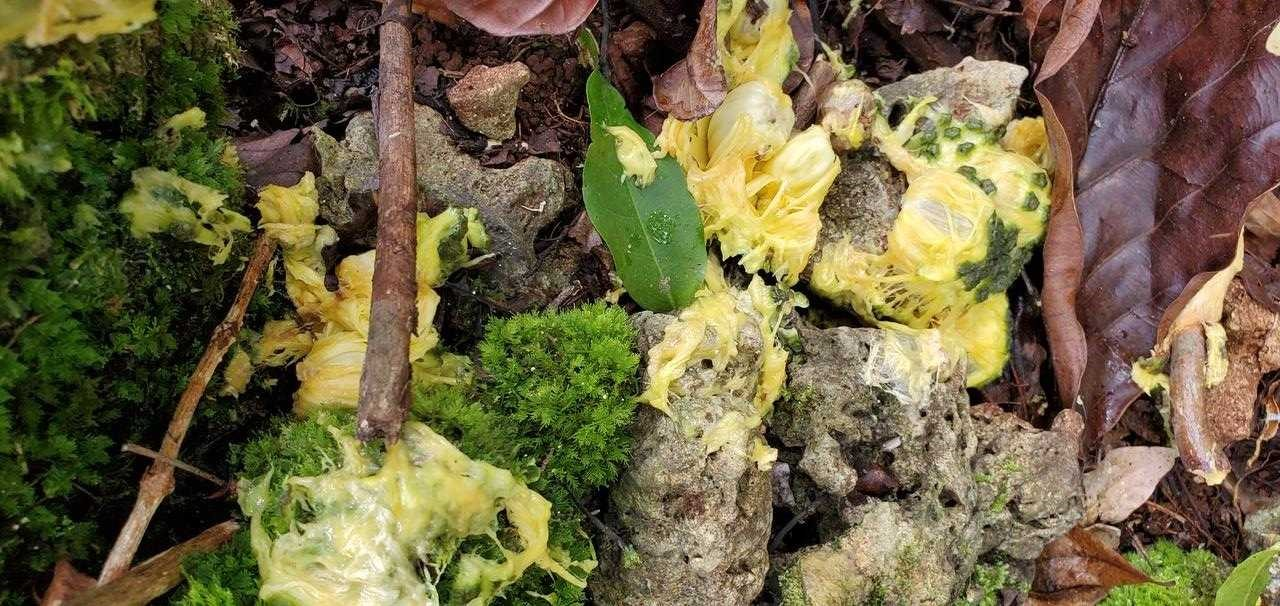
Fallen fruit with seeds (hutu) in casings on limestone coral, Dededo, Guam

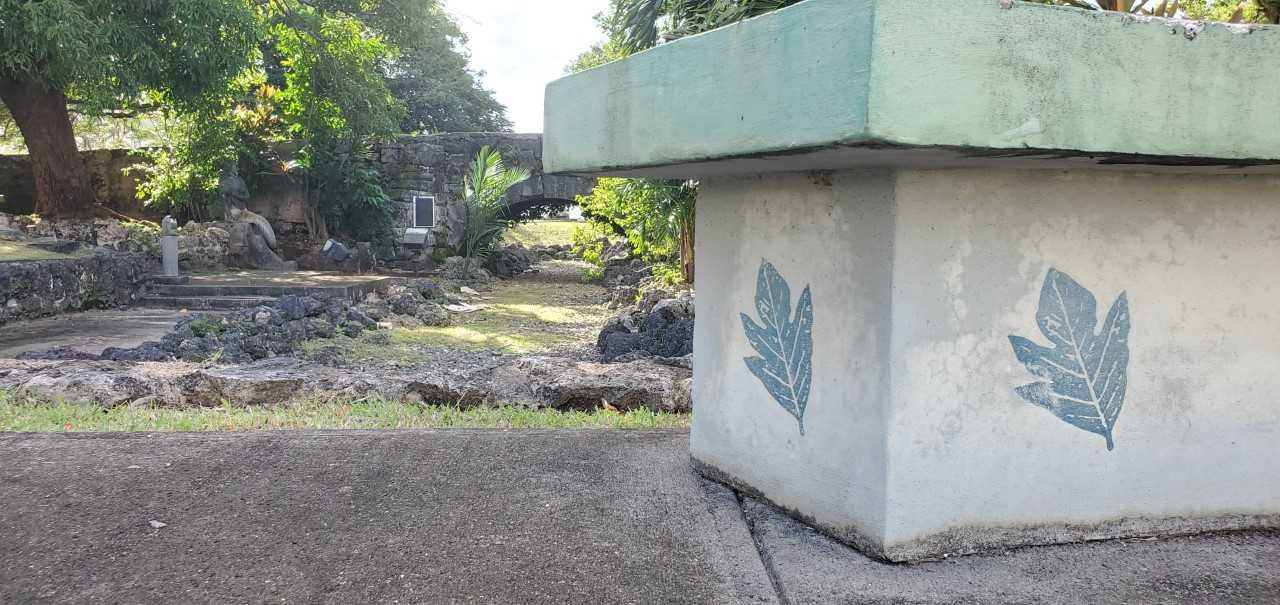
Leaf stencil on bench, Spanish Bridge, Hagåtña, Guam

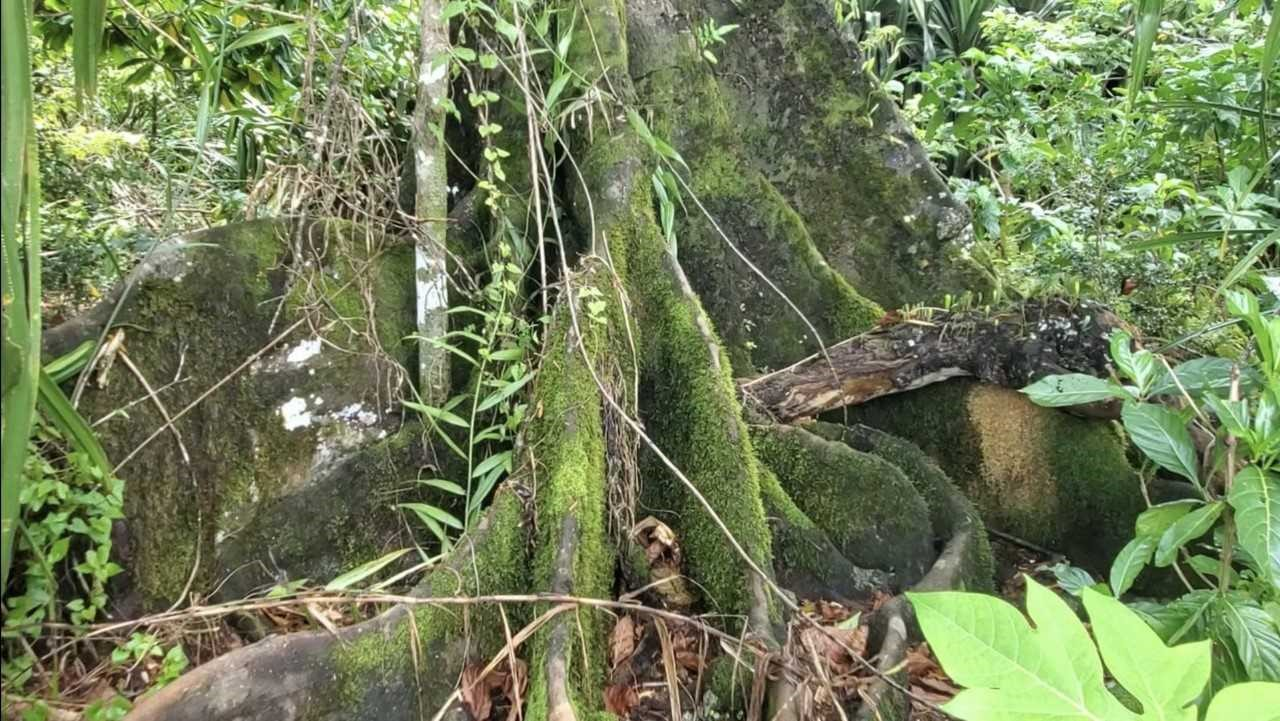
Buttresses at base of trunk, Anderson Air Force Base, Guam

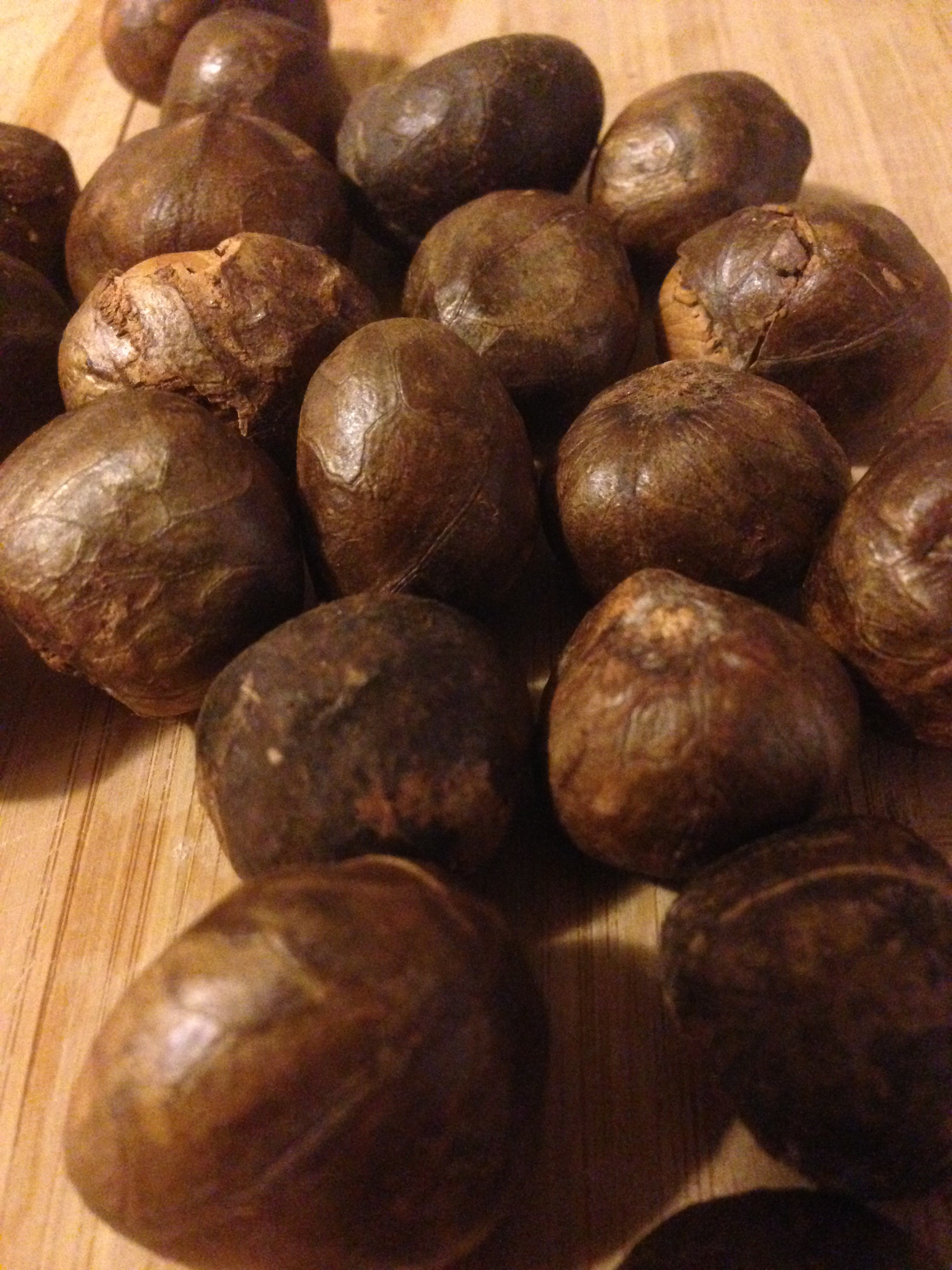
Seeds (hutu), Dededo, Guam

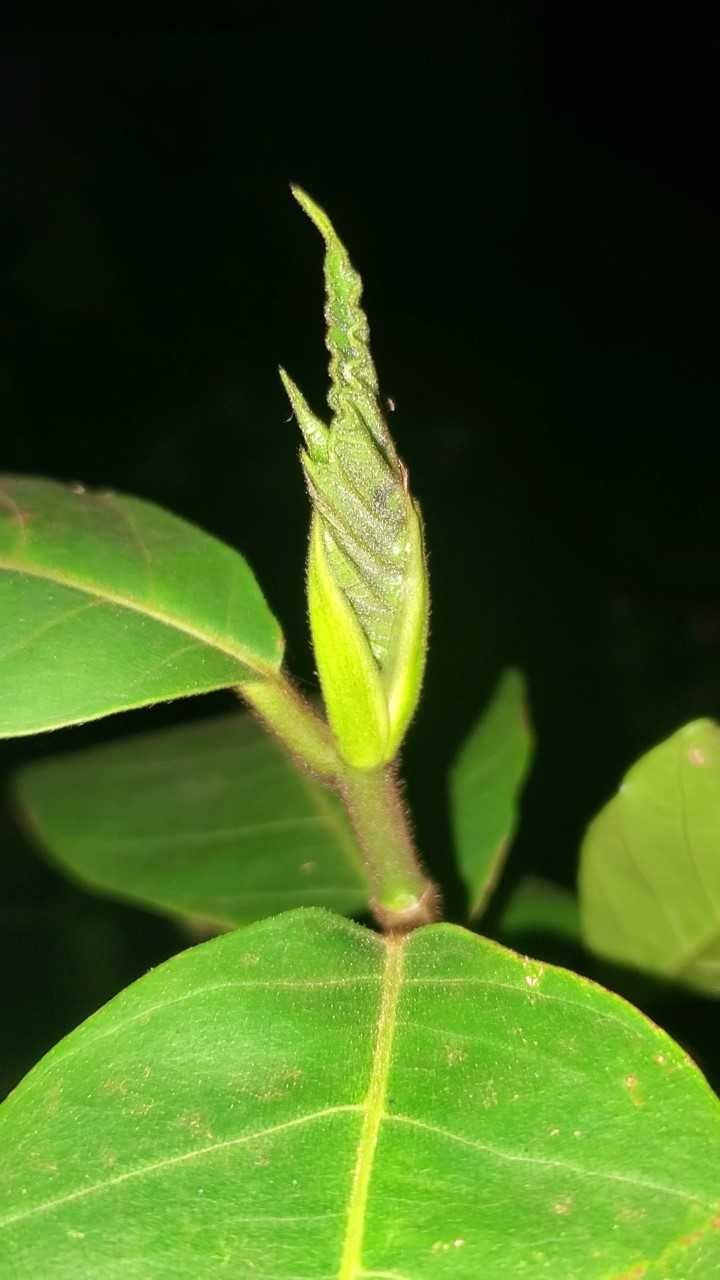
Terminal leaf bud. Dededo, Guam

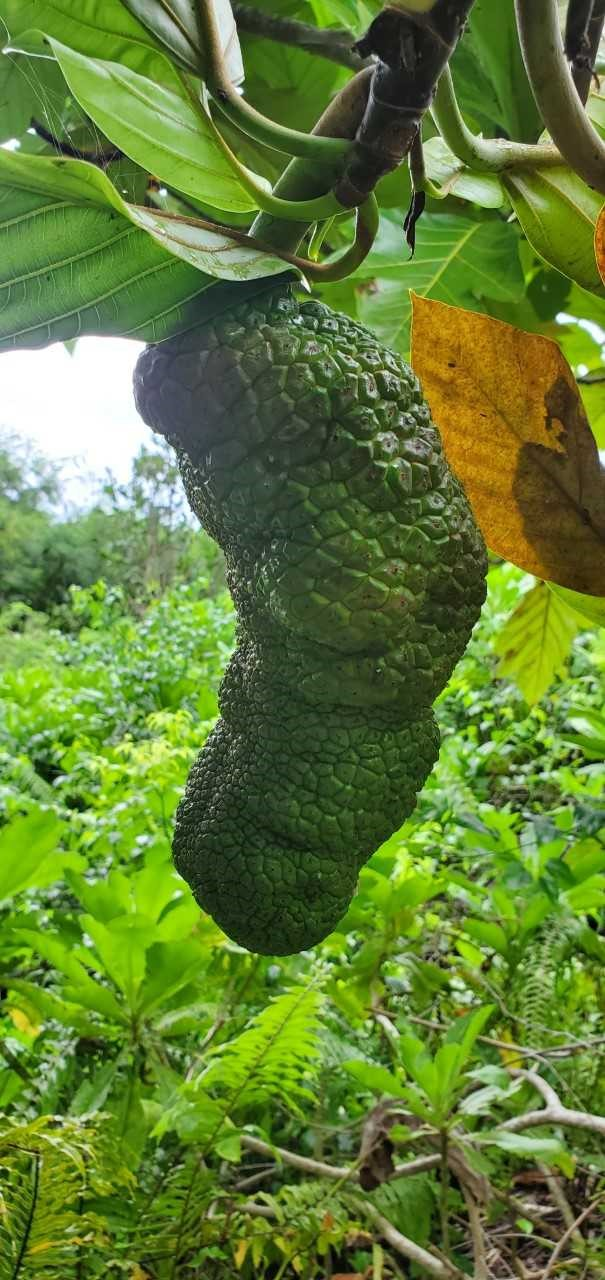
Developing fruit, Guam National Wildlife Refuge

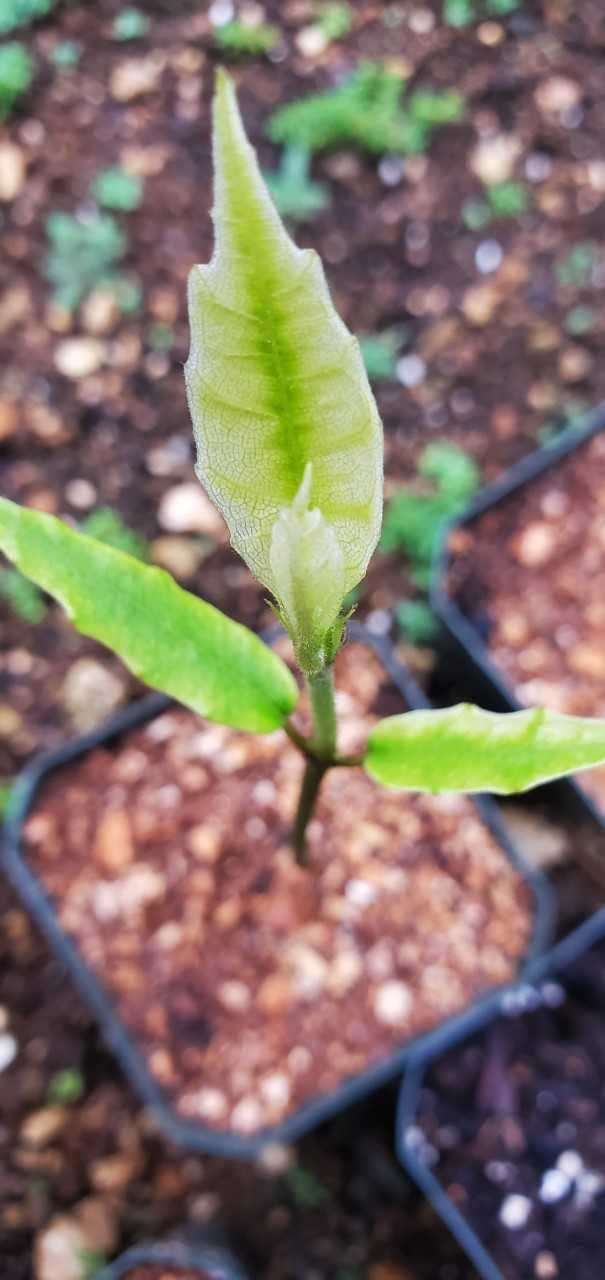
Seedling, Dededo, Guam

== See also ==
- Domesticated plants and animals of Austronesia
- List of endemic plants in the Mariana Islands
