= HMS Assistant =

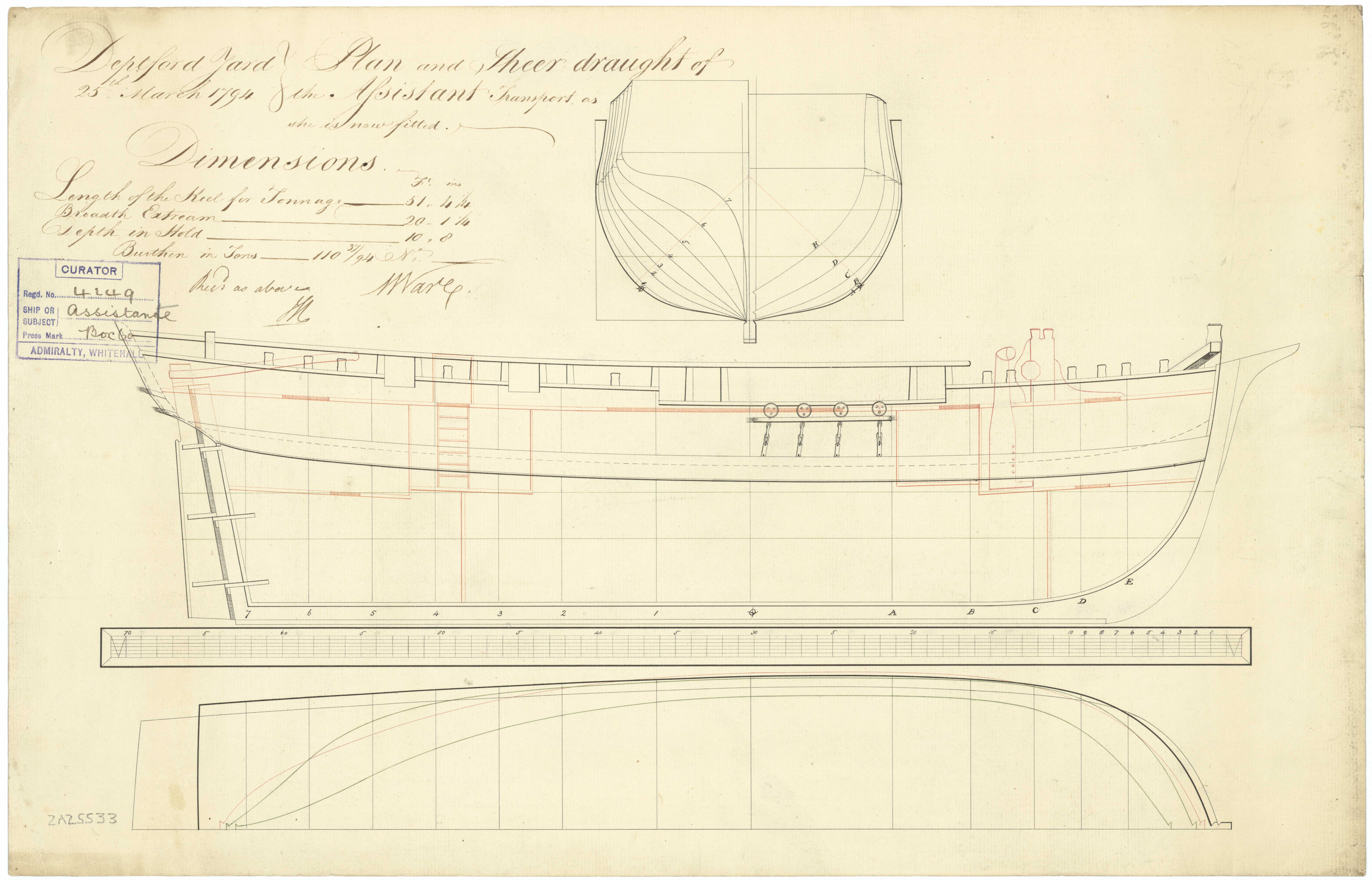
Assistant

Assistant was a brig of 110 tons burden, armed with four 4-pounders and eight swivel guns, and carrying a complement of twenty-seven.

She accompanied HMS Providence (1791) as tender on William Bligh's second breadfruit expedition from August 1791 to August 1793. Her commander was Lieutenant Nathaniel Portlock.

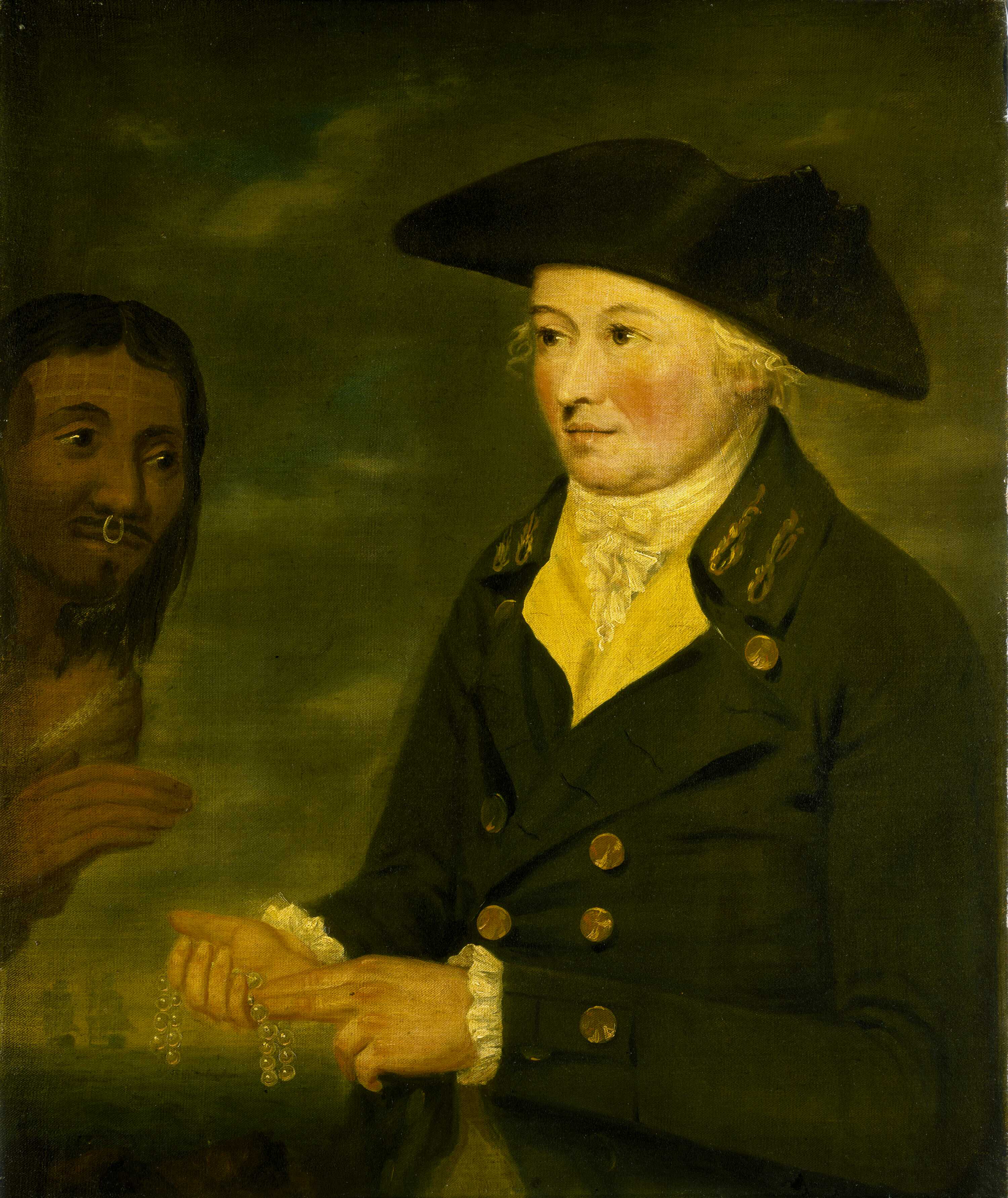
Captain Nathaniel Portlock (c. 1747–1817)
